= Renaissance architecture of Toulouse =

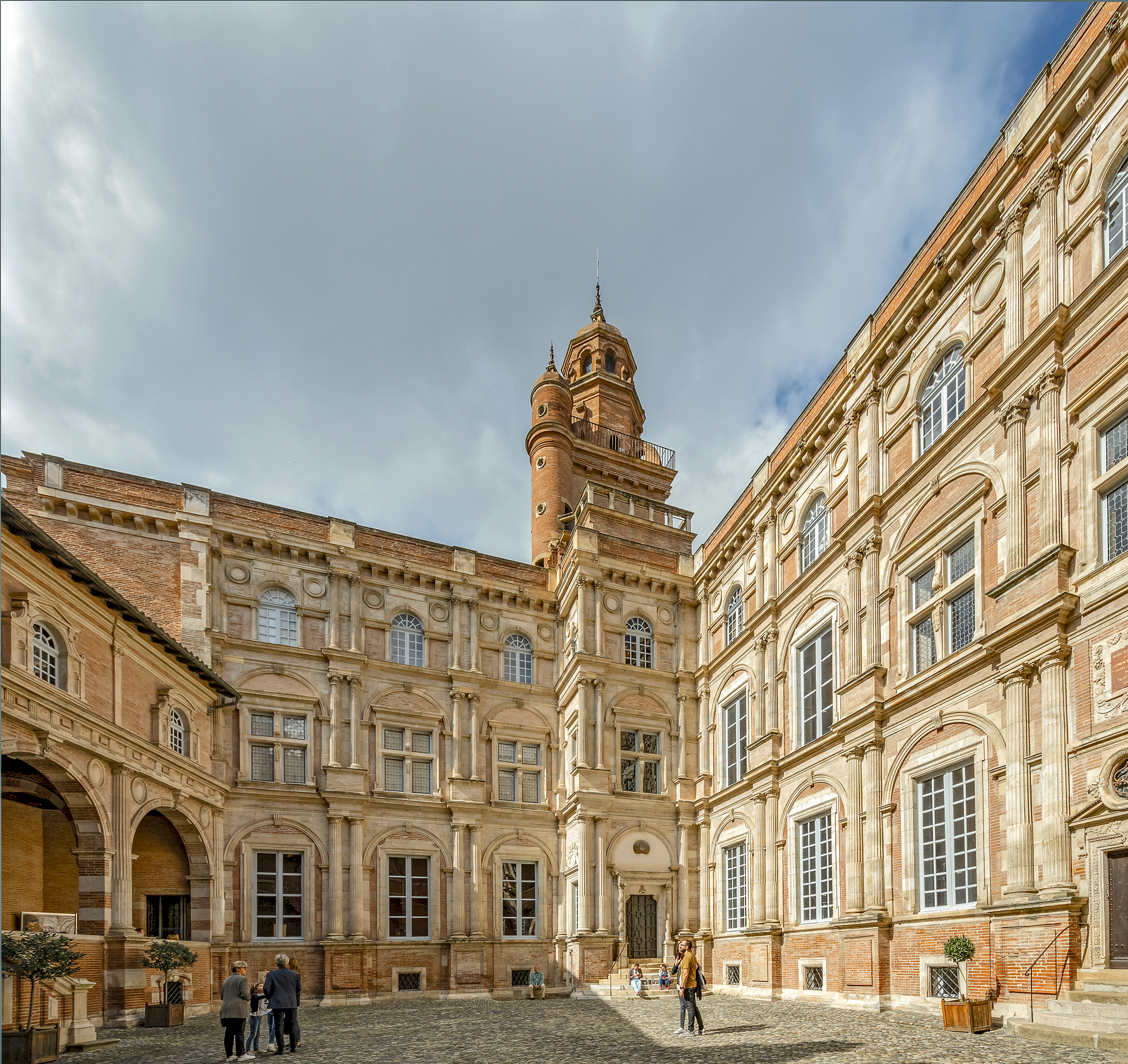
The hôtel d'Assézat, architectural jewel of the Toulouse Renaissance.

In the 16th century, the Renaissance, which called for a return to the models of Roman antiquity, spread throughout Europe from Italy, notably through treatises and engravings referring to the treatise De architectura by Vitruvius (90–20 BC), Roman theorist of ancient architecture. Each center of culture and creation reinterpreted these new references according to its local traditions.

At the beginning of the 16th century Toulouse was experiencing a prosperous period. It was the third largest city in France, a rich and powerful provincial capital that the woad trade was providing with merchants of international stature. The city was also the seat of the first French provincial parlement, whose jurisdiction extended from the Rhône to Gascony, of a university renowned even beyond the borders (mainly in law), and of a large archbishopric in wich the abbey church of Saint-Sernin, renowned for its exceptional collection of relics, was regarded as one of the holiest places in Christendom. (Note: With more than two hundred claimed holy relics, including those of six apostles, Saint-Sernin possesses one of the most important collections of relics in the Western world.)

These factors of dynamism fostered a deep humanist impulse, affirmed the city's role as a radiant artistic place and maintained a climate of social emulation in which it was important to be visible. These characteristics of the Toulouse Renaissance can be found in the richness and quality of its architecture, fortunately largely preserved but perhaps difficult to apprehend in its entirety because it is somewhat scattered throughout the vast perimeter of the historical centre and moreover partially hidden in courtyards not easily accessible to the public.

It is therefore the purpose of this article to bring together and to present the various elements of the Renaissance architecture of Toulouse, which earned the city to be described as "the most beautiful city in France" by the scholar Joseph Justus Scaliger at the end of the sixteenth century.

== Architecture in the service of municipal ambitions ==
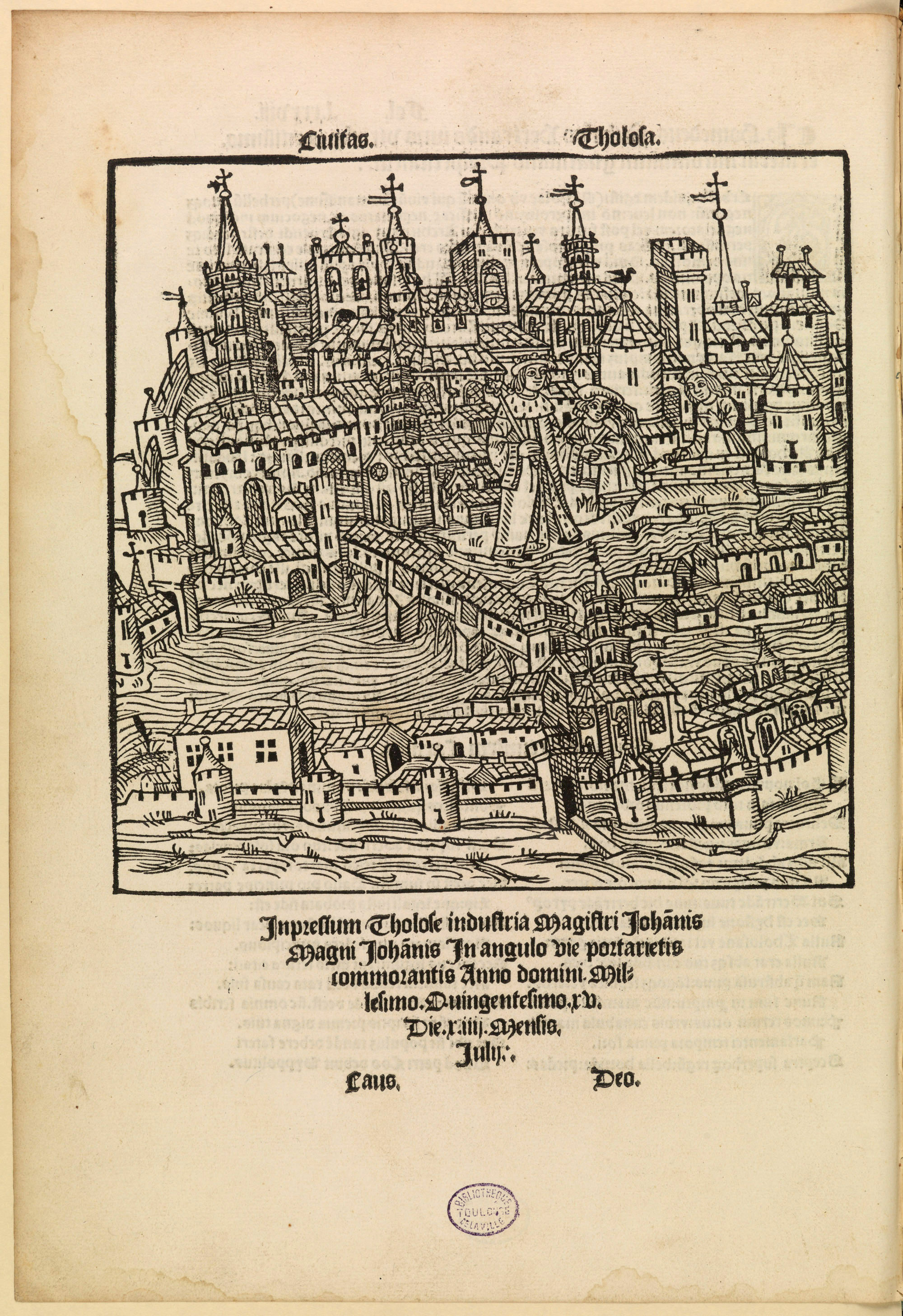
This engraving of the Civitas Tholosa illustrates the Gesta Tholosanorum, written in 1515 by the former capitoul Nicolas Bertrand, one of the first publications to tell the story of the city.

A home of erudition and humanism, Toulouse welcomed the Renaissance and looked back on its rich ancient past of which there were few visible remains, the ancient Roman monuments having served as "brick quarries" throughout the Middle Ages.

Faced with a royal administration eager to diminish the prerogatives of the communal power of France's major cities, the municipal institution of Toulouse sought to promote its prestige and legitimacy. At the request of the capitouls (the city's chief magistrates) scholars such as Nicolas Bertrand, Guillaume de La Perrière and Antoine Noguier revived the Palladia Tolosa (Palladian Toulouse) evoked by the Latin poets Martial, Ausonius and Sidonius Apollinaris, the ancient Toulouse placed by emperor Domitian under the patronage of the goddess Pallas (Minerva) presented as the protector of arts and letters. In 1522, at the instigation of the clerk Pierre Salamon, the municipal palace of capitulum (chapter) became Capitolium (Capitol), reflecting the desire to imitate Rome and its ancient references.

These idealized links between the municipal institution of Toulouse and Ancient Rome found expression in the arts and in particular in architecture.

=== The towers of the former Capitole ===
==== The Capitole Archive Tower ====
Fearing an invasion of Languedoc by the Spanish army of Charles V who was maneuvering in the Pyrenees, and concerned to protect their gunpowder reserve and their precious archives, the capitouls built between 1525 and 1530 by Laurent Clary a tower then called "Archive tower", which is now called "the Keep" (le Donjon in French) for its fortified appearance. On the ground floor was the "Small Consistory", a prestigious room where the capitouls held their private meetings.

On a façade of this tower, in a stone frame arranged in the manner of an ancient temple whose column capitals implement the superimposition of the Doric and Ionic orders, the capitouls presented themselves as Roman consuls. The Latin inscription engraved in the stone announces: FIEBAT ANNO CHRISTIANAE SALUTIS MDXXV IDIBS NOVEBR NOBILIBUS PREINSIGNITIS CAPITOLINIS DECURIONIBUS, which means "Was made the year of salvation 1525, at the ides of November, by the noble and very distinguished decurions of the Capitol". By posing as "decurions" sitting in a "Capitol", the capitouls of the Renaissance hoped to put forward a historical legitimacy which they claimed dated back to antiquity and exceeded that of the kings of France, (Note: The Toulouse Capitoulate appeared in 1147, its consuls being advisers to Count Alfonso Jordan, in charge of the administration of the city. The claim of the Renaissance capitouls to hold their antiquity to the Roman Empire and Emperor Theodosius was therefore unfounded. However, this type of exaggeration was not peculiar to Toulouse at that time.) in the face of a royal administration and a Parlement that tended more and more to limit their prerogatives and the municipal liberties they had conquered.

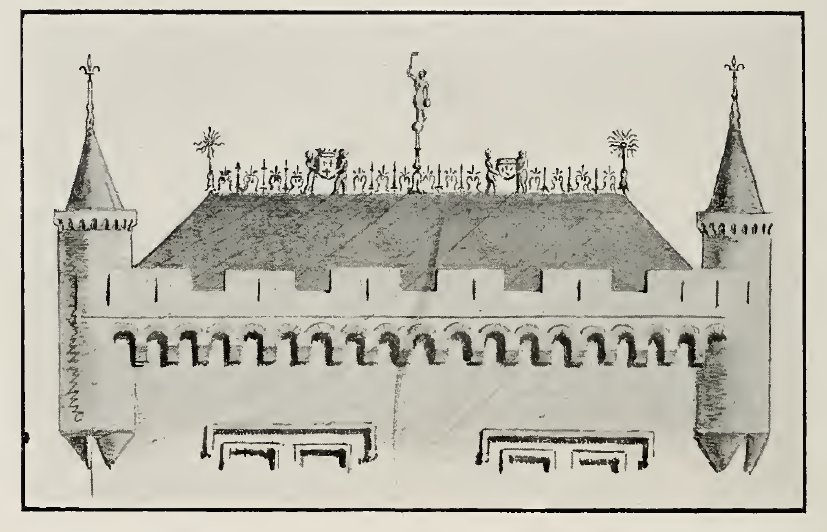
Illustration of the roof of the Donjon before 1829, topped by Lady Tholose holding a weather vane (after Jules de Lahondès).

Between 1550 and 1829, a gilded bronze statue named Lady Tholose (Dame Tholose in French) stood on the roof of the Archive tower. The work of the sculptor Jean Rancy and the foundryman Claude Pelhot, it personified the city, in the guise of the goddess Pallas Athena, and the values that united it around its municipal magistrates. Toulouse used its large arsenal to cast the statue, the first of its size to be cast in France outside the royal workshops. Its dynamic pose, balanced on a single supporting leg, predated Giambologna's Flying Mercury by more than fifteen years. The wet drapery, gestures, twisting movement and multiple viewpoints of the statue reflect techniques that Jean Rancy adopted early in his career. The statue held a weather vane in her right hand and leaned with her left hand on a shield with the arms of the city. The shield was inscribed with the letters CPQT MDL, standing for Capitulum Populusque Tolosanum 1550 ("the Capitoulate and the people of Toulouse"), which, like the Roman SPQR, referred to Rome and to the idea of an urban republic, with the capitouls presenting themselves as sitting in a Capitol.

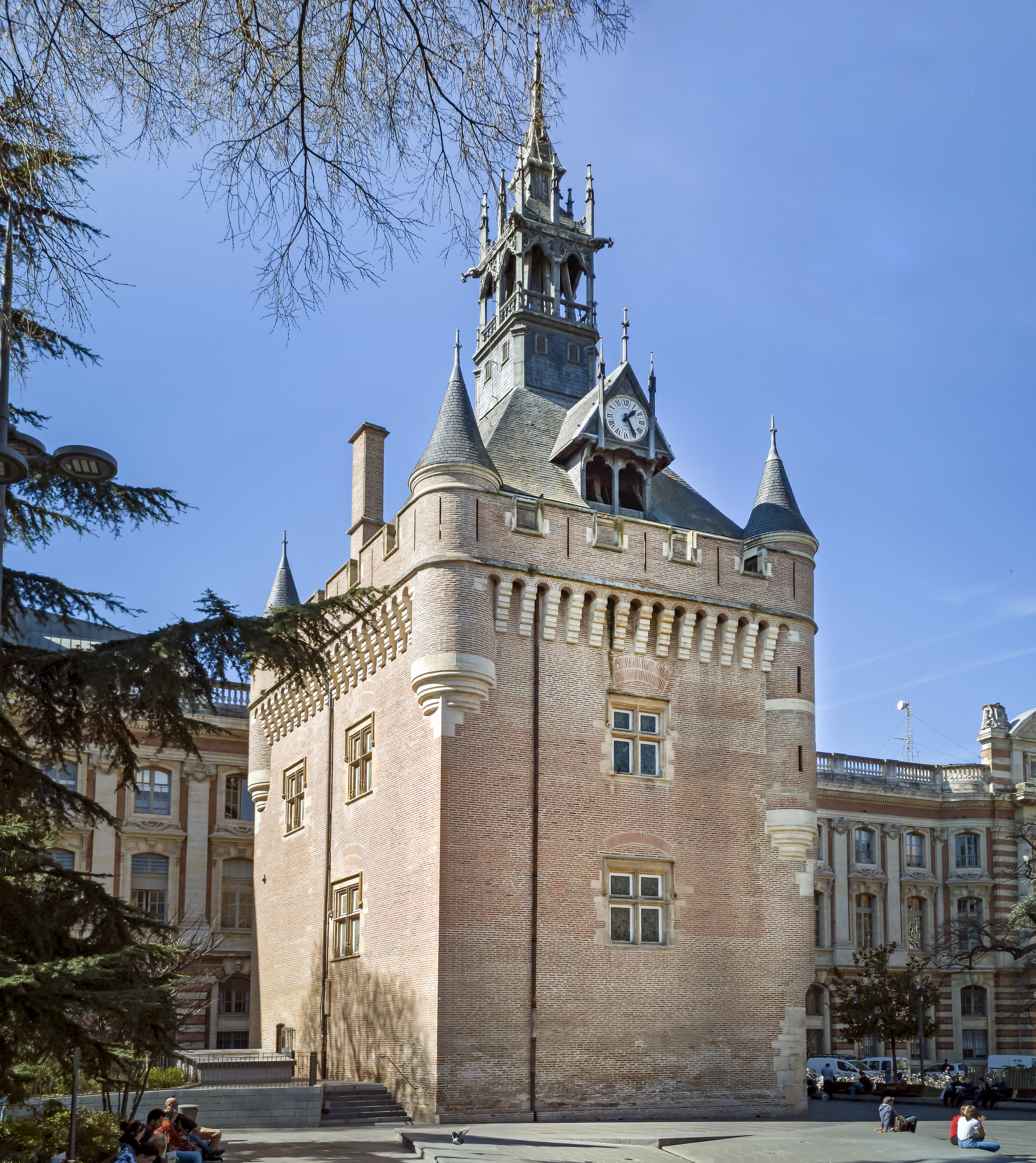
The Archive tower (1525-1530, except for the roof modified by Viollet-le-Duc in the 19th century).

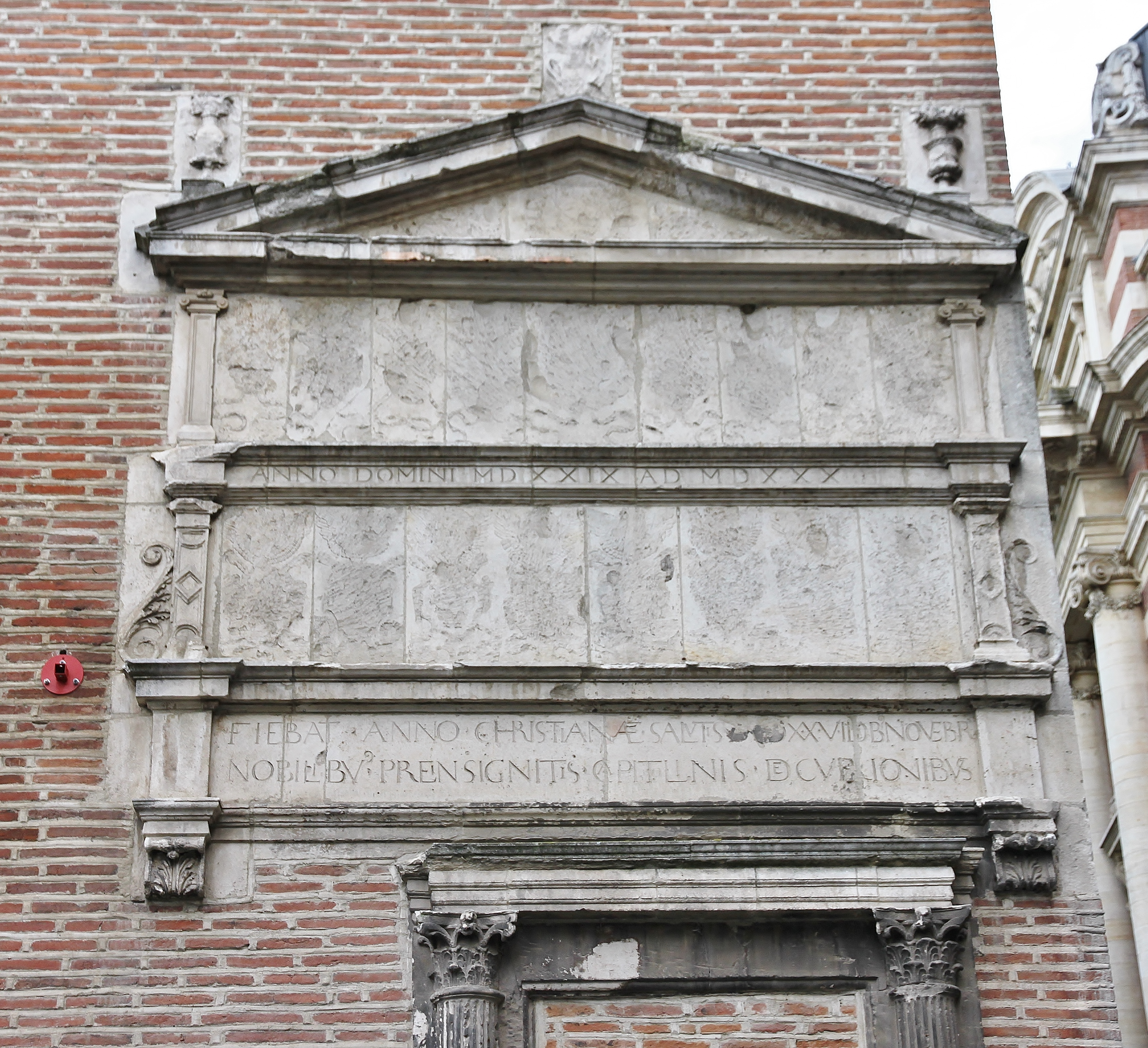
Inscriptions in Latin on the tower.

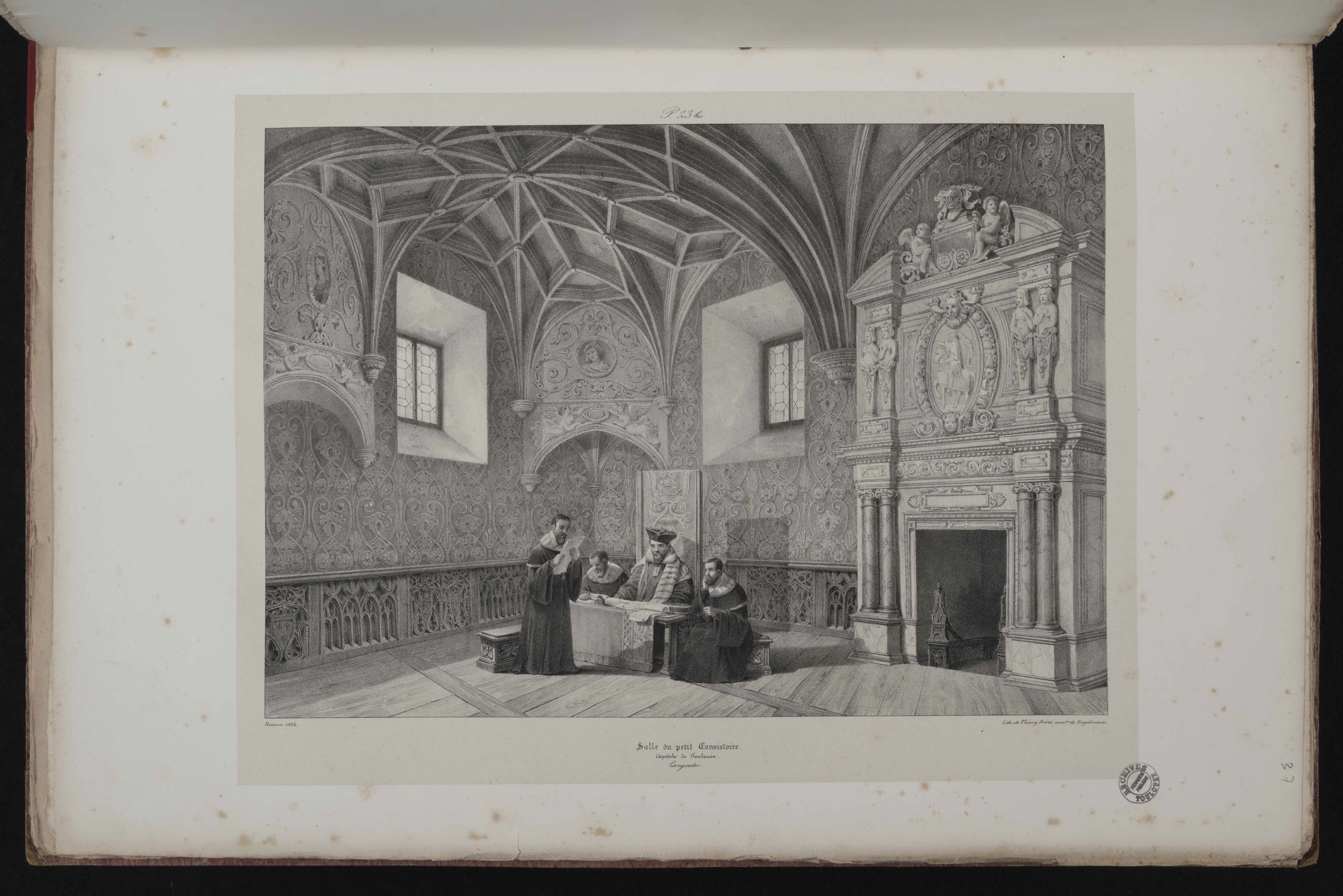
Representation of the Small Consistory, 16th century vault, fireplace by Nicolas Bachelier (1536, now destroyed), 17th century decoration.

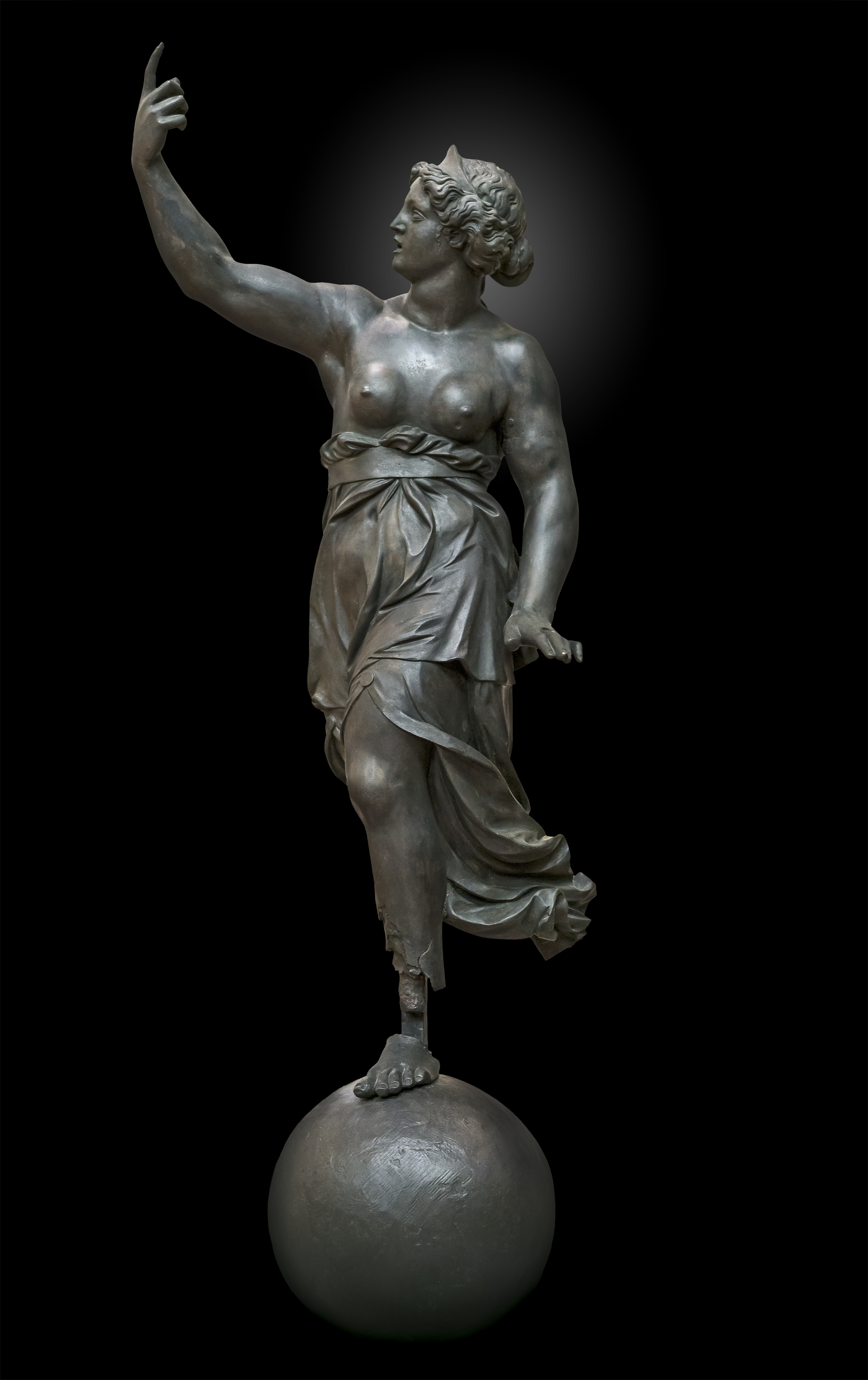
Lady Tholose (1550), once placed at the top of the tower, was an allegory of the city and municipal power.

==== The Tour de la Vis (destroyed in 1885) ====
Although the Archive Tower is still of Gothic architecture, with the exception of the decorative elements presented in the previous chapter, the Tour de la Vis, which was added to it a few years later, was an important milestone of Renaissance architecture in Toulouse until its destruction in 1885.

Erected between 1532 and 1542, this stair tower was intended to replace the external wooden staircase that served the upper floor of the Archive Tower. A massive square construction, it contained a suspended staircase of 61 steps considered to be an architectural masterpiece with its helical vault, hollowed out in the centre and supported only on the perimeter of the building.

It was the master mason Sébastien Bouguereau who built this remarkable staircase, one of the first attempts of the Renaissance to replace spiral staircases. This example remained unique in Toulouse, where the straight staircase supported by a dividing wall, less complex to build, was later preferred. This feat of stereotomy, which was inspired by Spanish achievements (Bouguereau having worked in that country), was the first known suspended staircase in France; the formula was not found in Paris until a century later (after 1640) before it then returned to the province.

In 1885 the municipality decided to demolish it because it masked the perspective of the new rear facade of the Capitole.

Drawings of the Tour de la Vis before its destruction

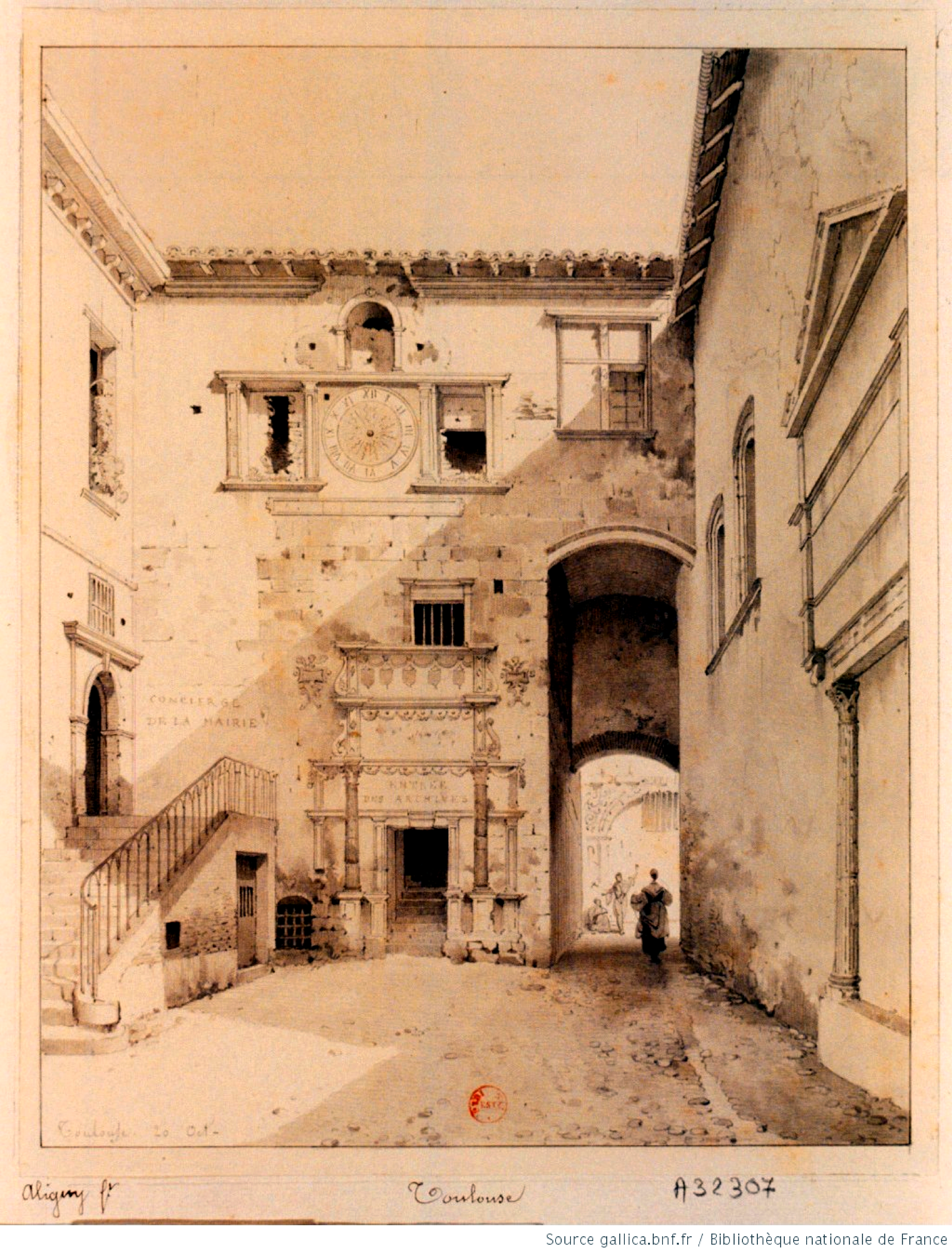
The Tour de la Vis before 1873

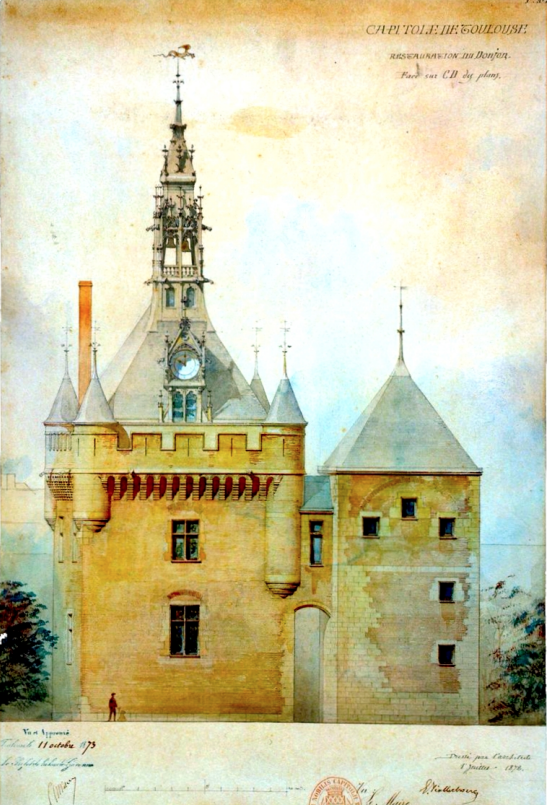
The Donjon and the Tour de la Vis between 1873 and 1885

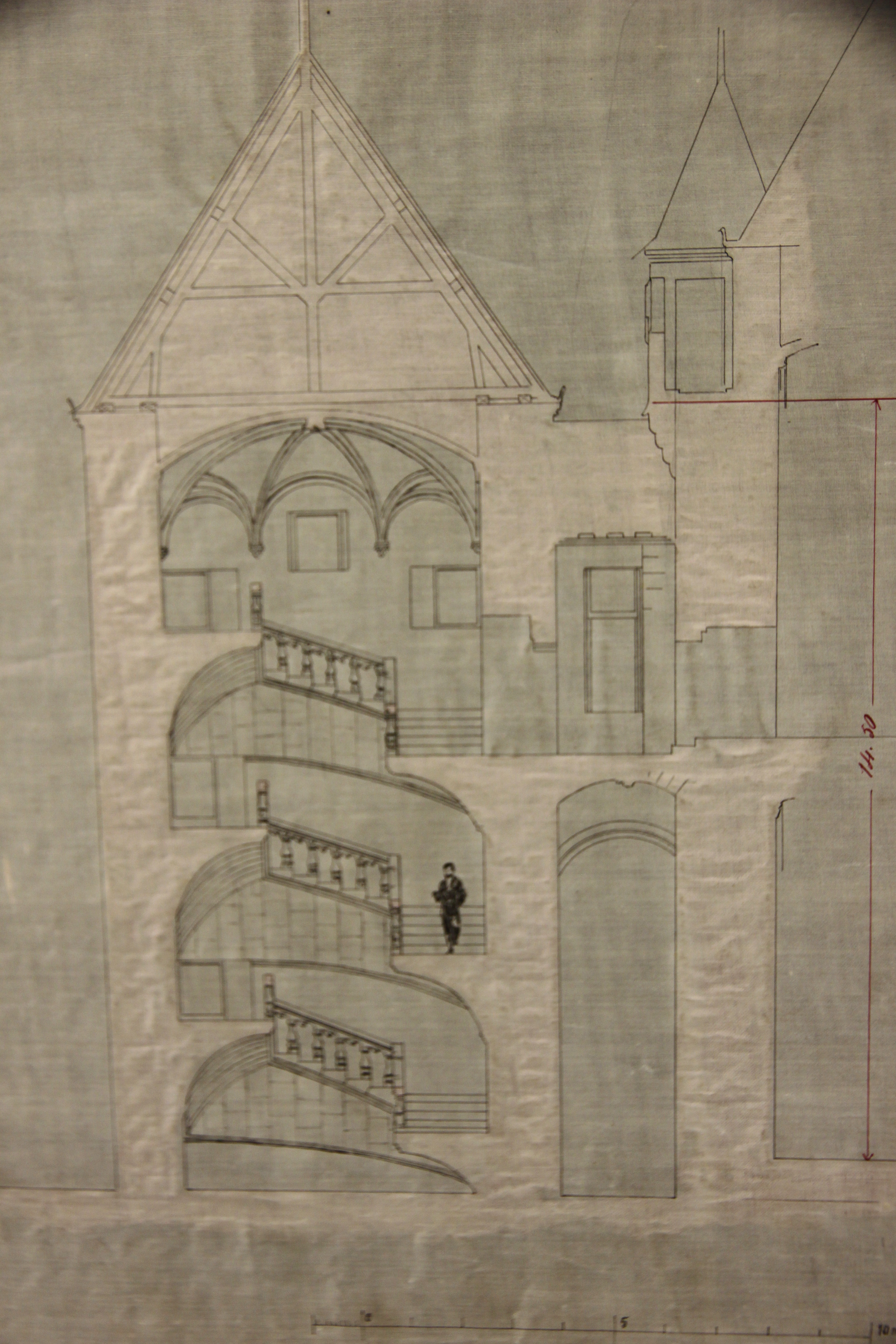

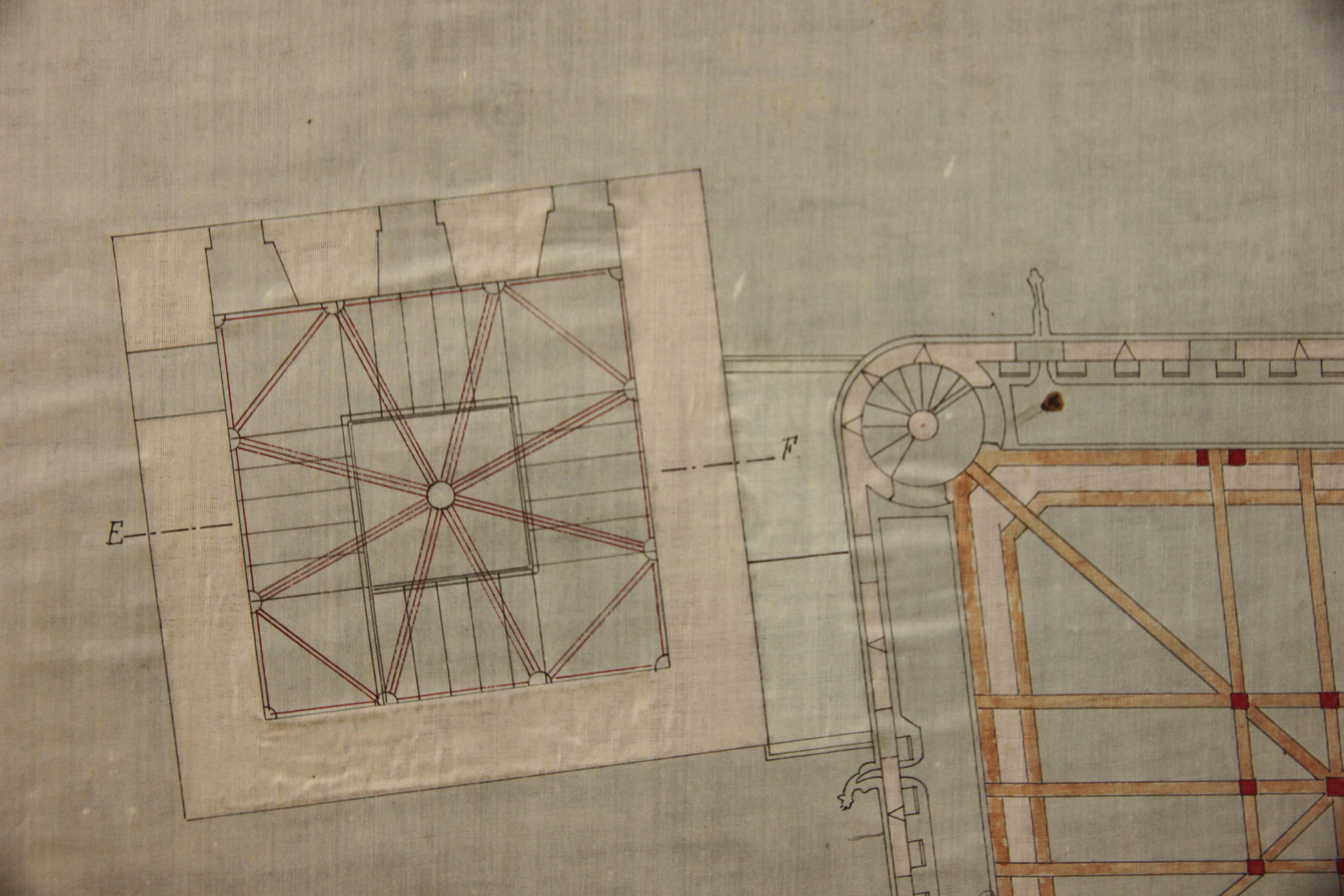

=== The Henry IV courtyard of the Capitole and its triumphal portal ===
==== The Henry IV courtyard ====
The Henri IV courtyard of the Capitole was built between 1602 and 1609 by the architect Pierre Souffron. It is characterised by a brick and stone polychromy, a composition that influenced the later constructions of the municipal palace. The ground floor arcades were built by Dominique Capmartin and Jean Bordes, while upstairs galleries were built to accommodate prestigious rooms, such as the one for the maintainers of the Floral Games, richly decorated with coats of arms and flowers painted by Jean Chalette, embryo of the first Hall of Illustrious Men.

In 1606 the Parlement of Toulouse caused difficulties regarding these works, and the capitouls turned to King Henry IV for authorisation to continue them, which he accepted on condition that his marble statue be placed there and that the north gallery be named "Gallery Henry IV, King of France and Navarre".

On the galleries with superimposed orders, the capitouls of 1605 had the city's and the king's arms and coats of arms placed, which had been damaged by the revolutionaries but were restored in 1873. The portal to the west dates from 1576, but it was transformed in 1607, then reworked again in 1676 and enriched with two female figures with lamb and owl representing Pallas / Lady Tholose, works by sculptor Philibert Chaillon.

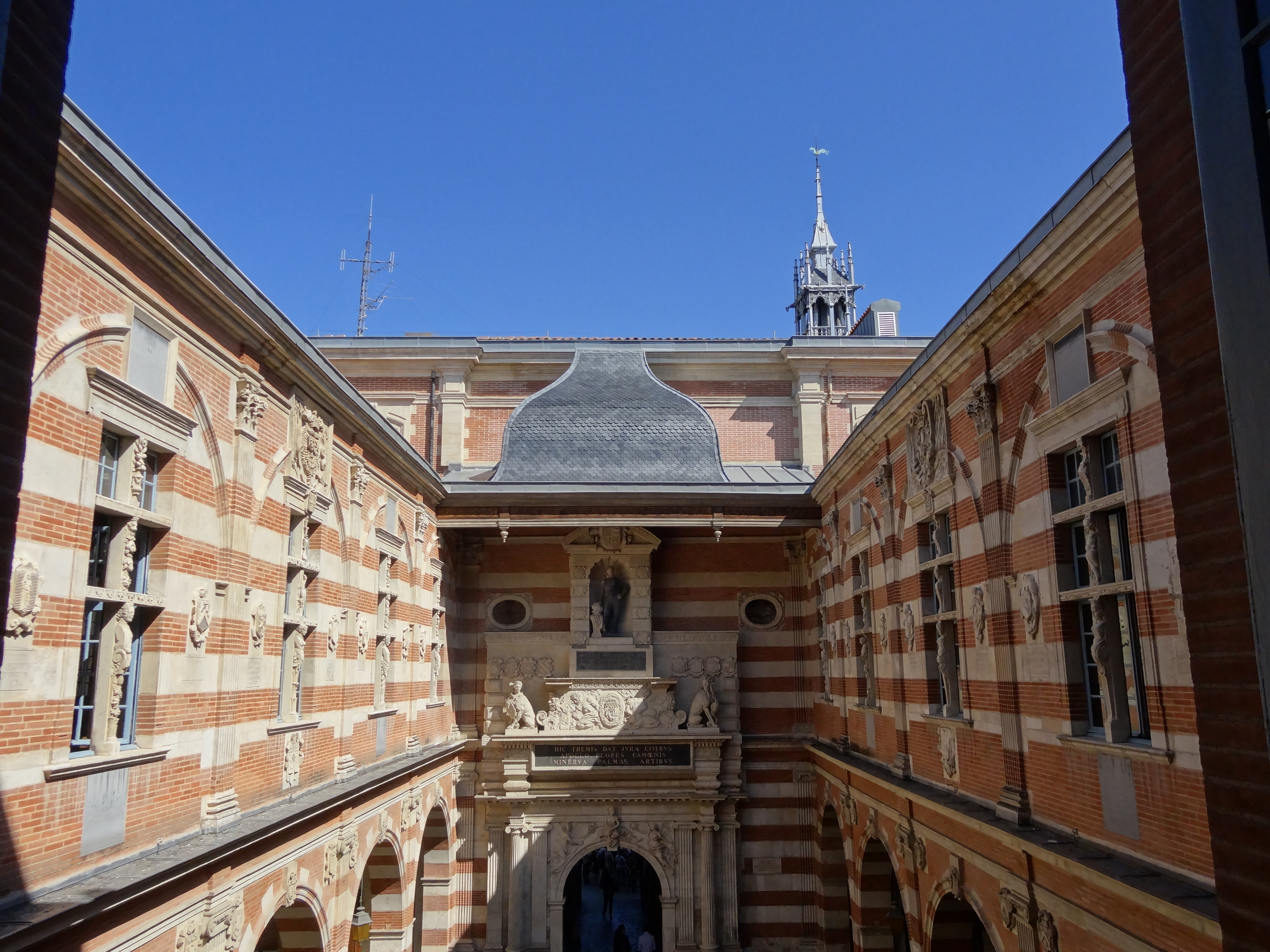
HenrY IV courtyard.

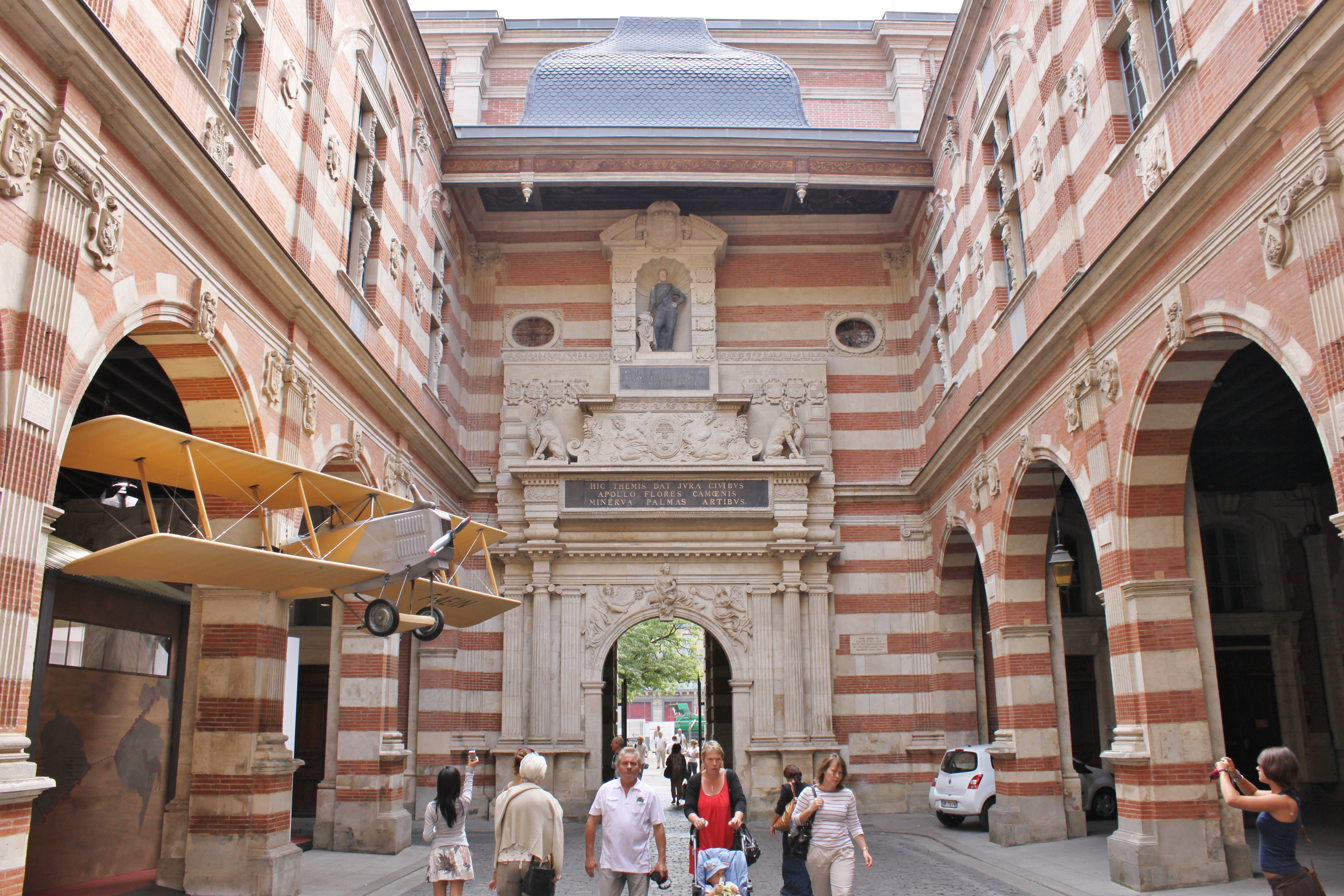
Henry IV courtyard, to the east.

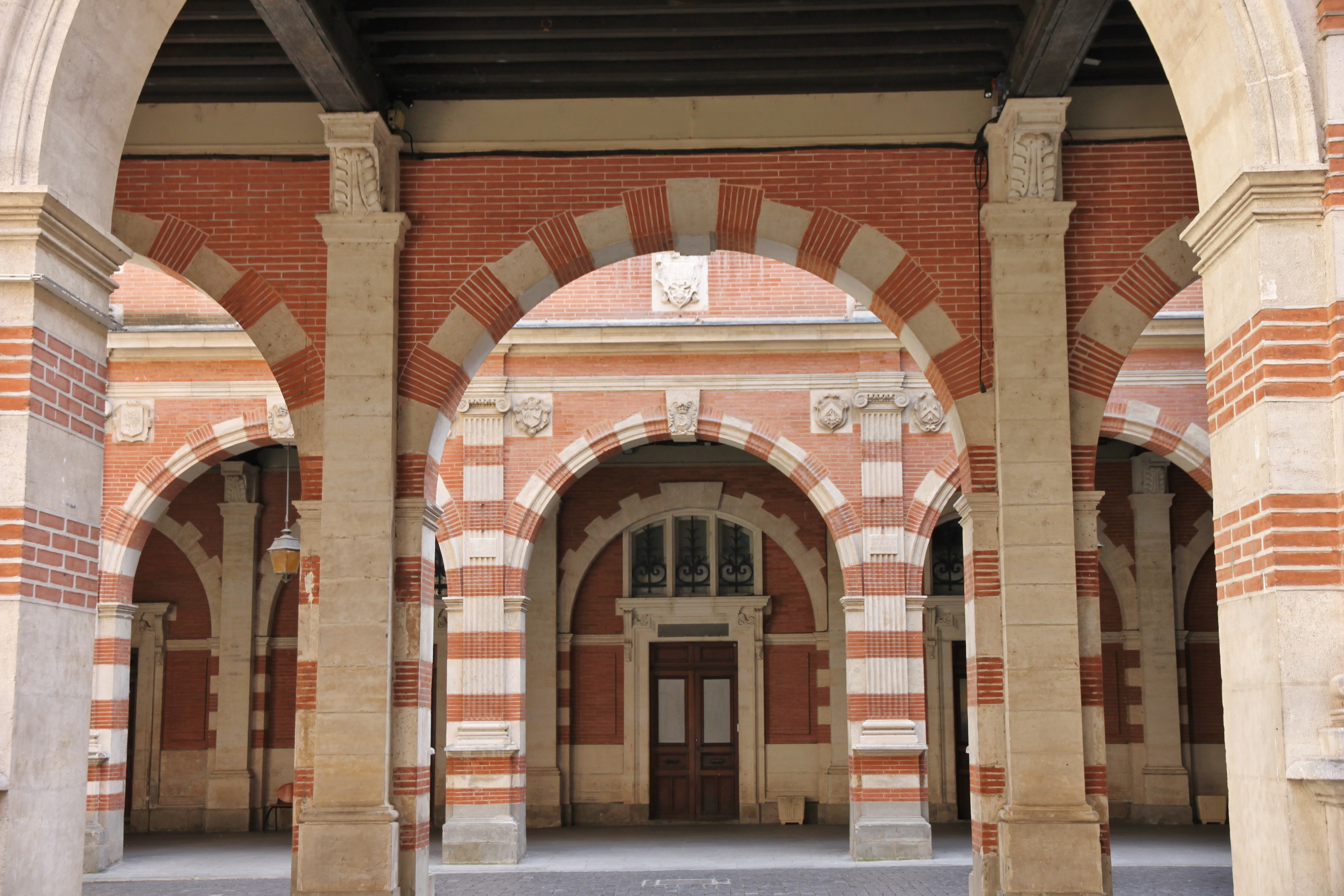
Henry IV courtyard, arcades.

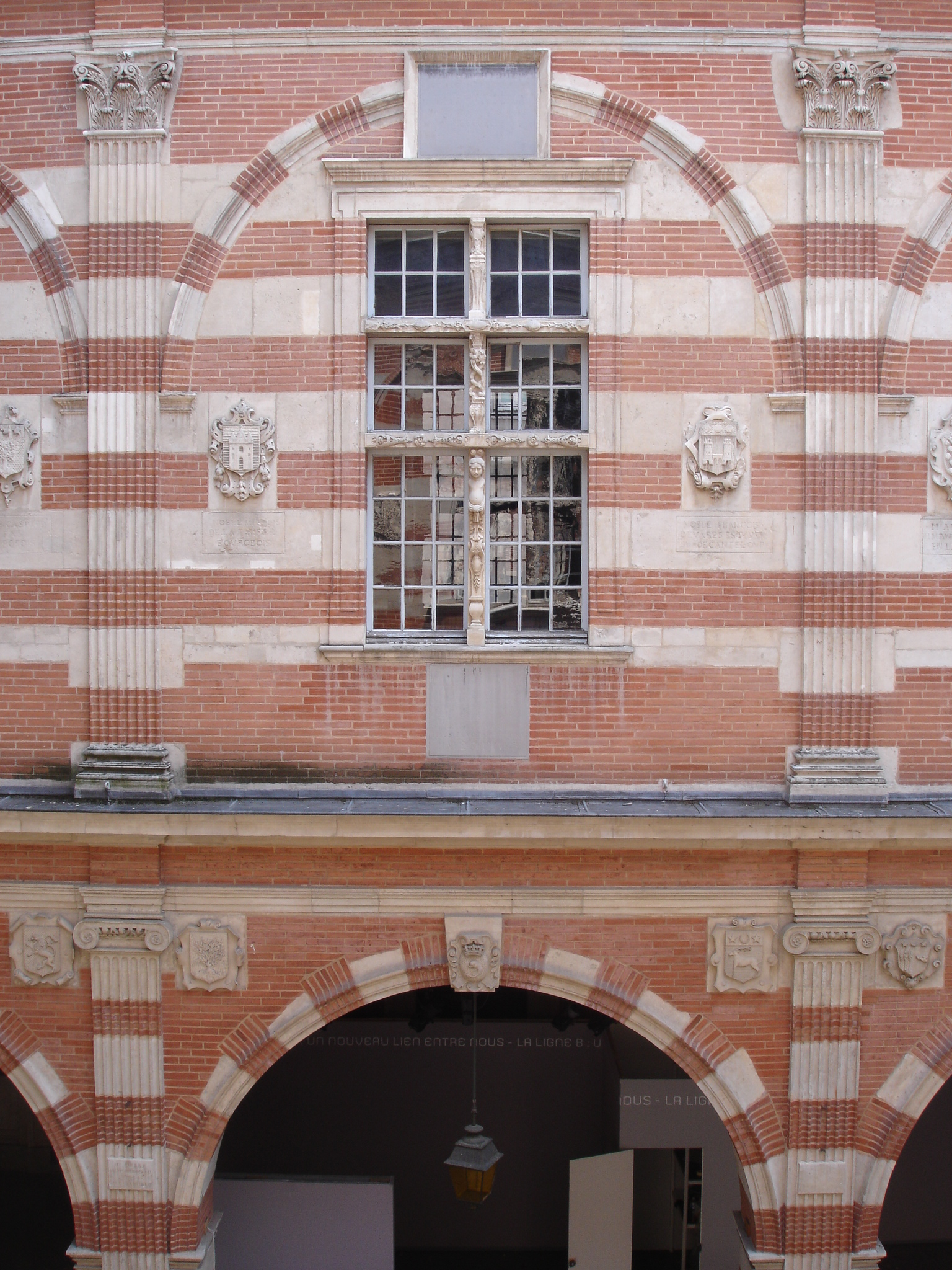
Henry IV courtyard, brick and stone polychromy.

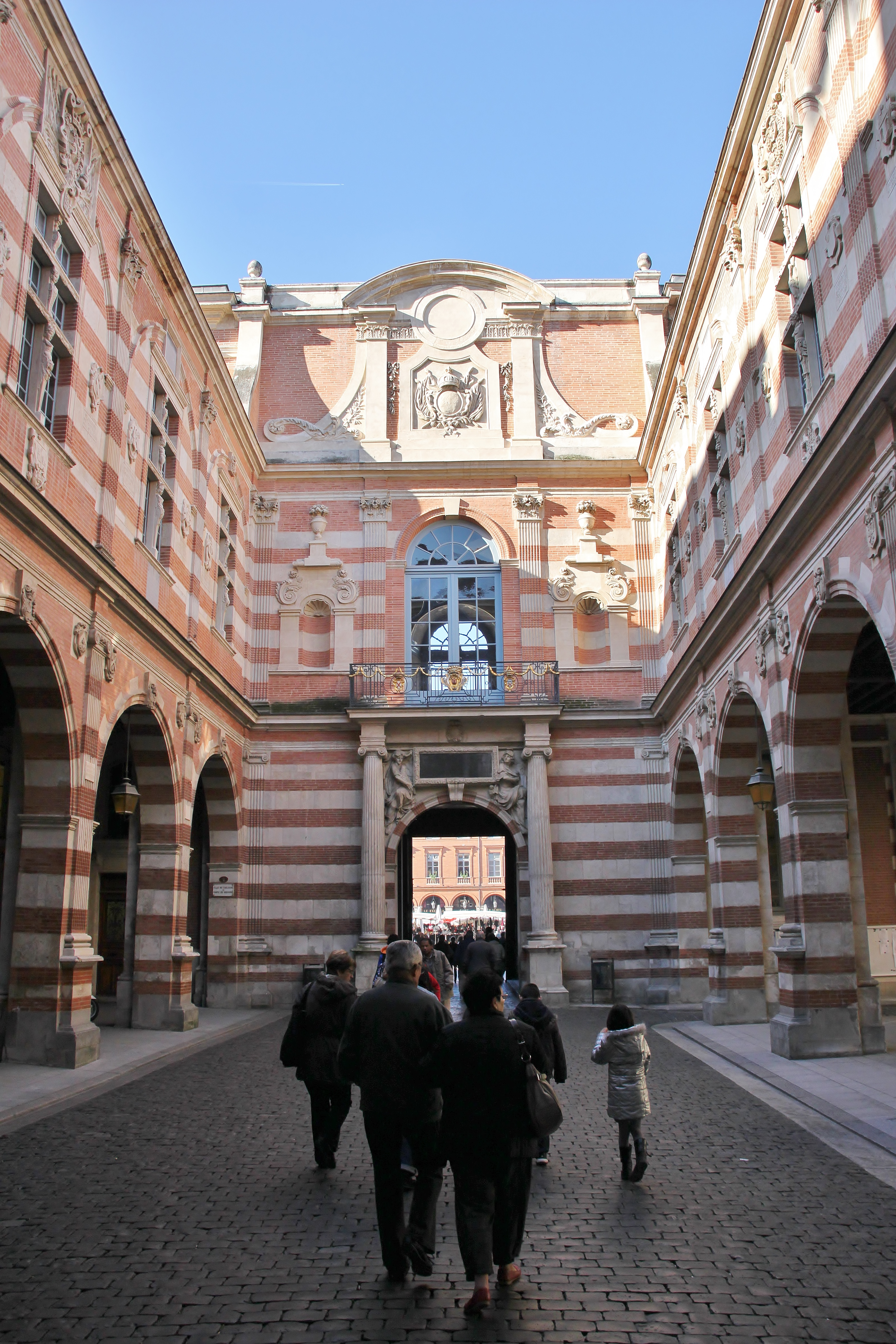
Henry IV courtyard, to the west.

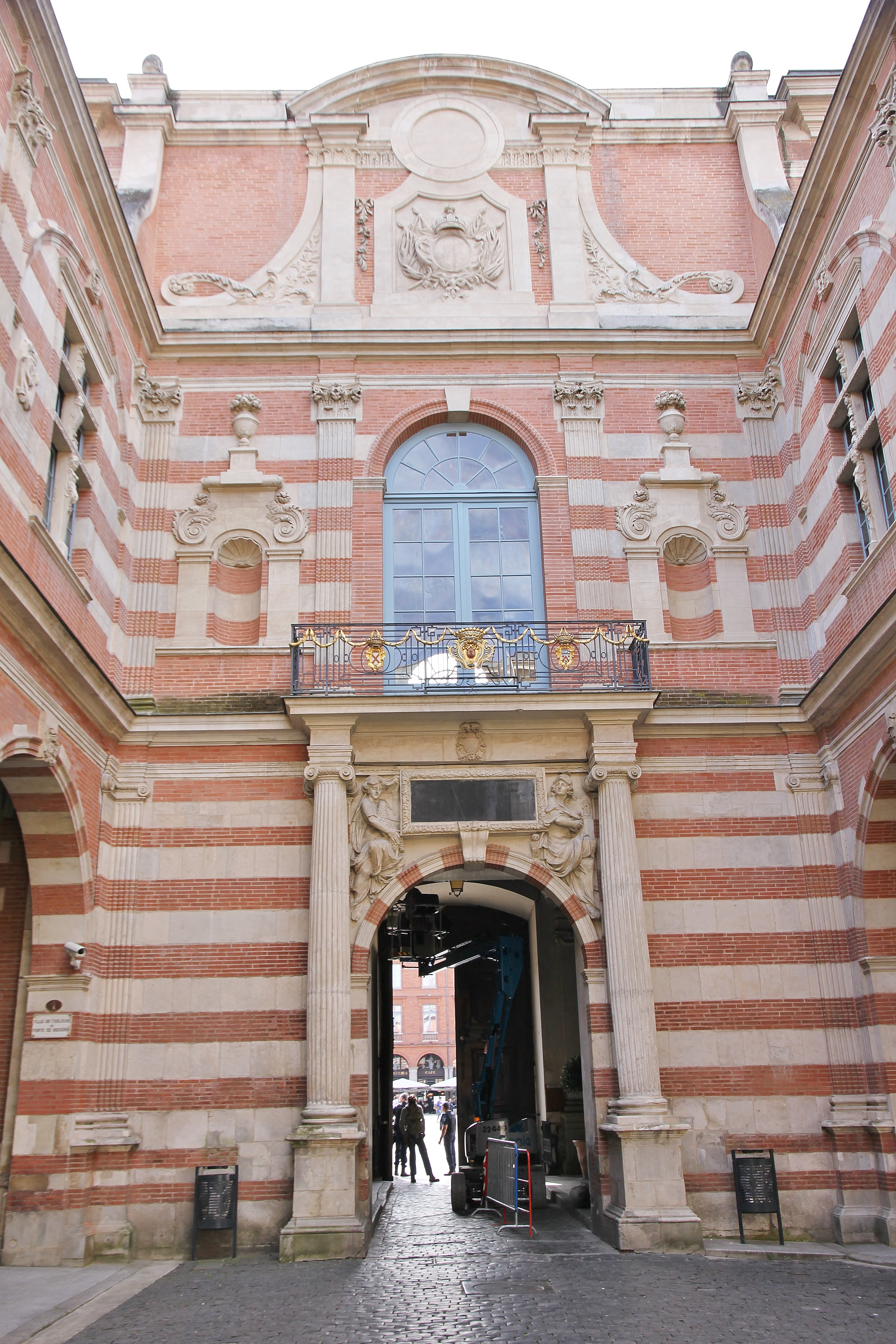
Henry IV courtyard, western facade (redesigned).

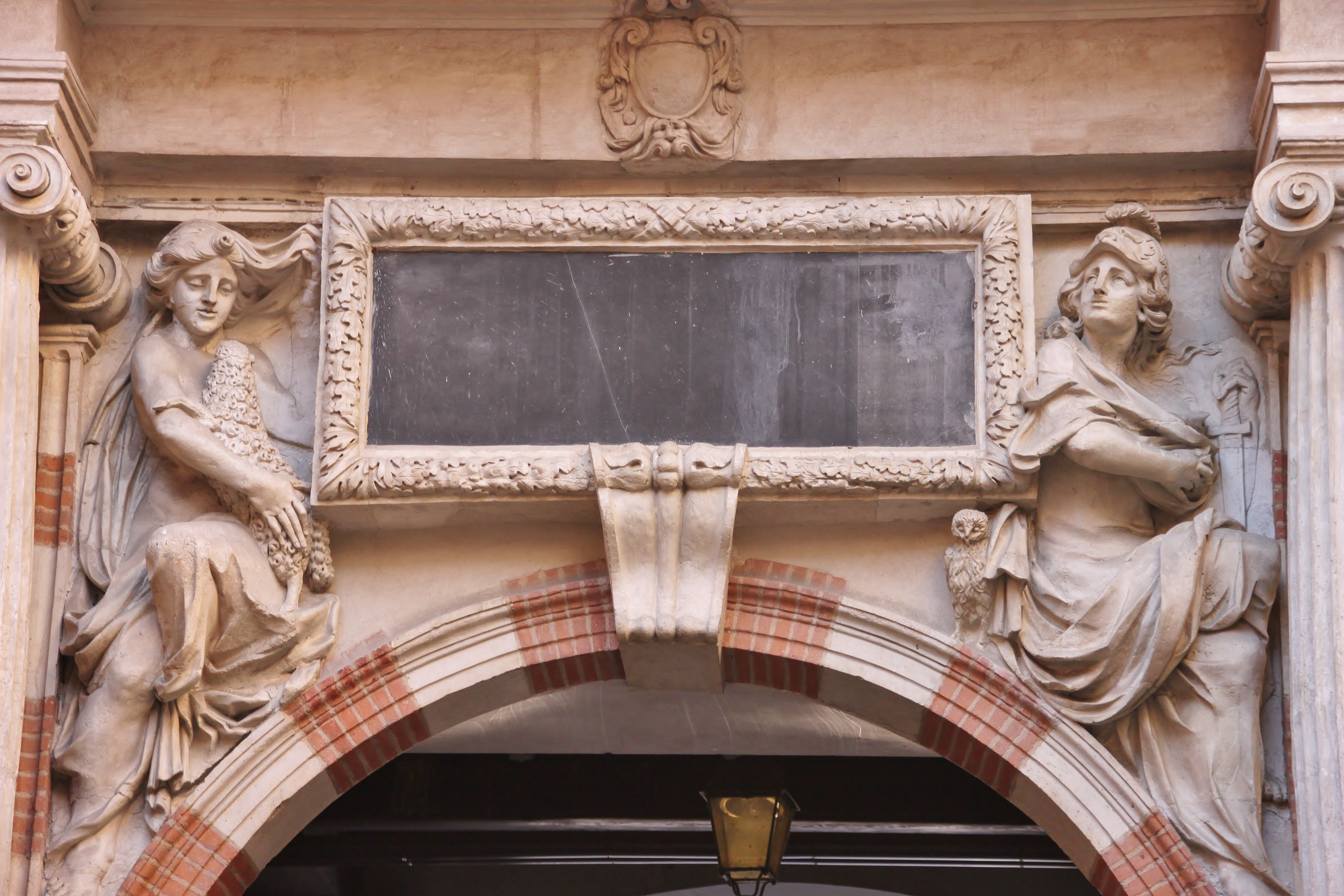
Henry IV courtyard, detail of the western portal.

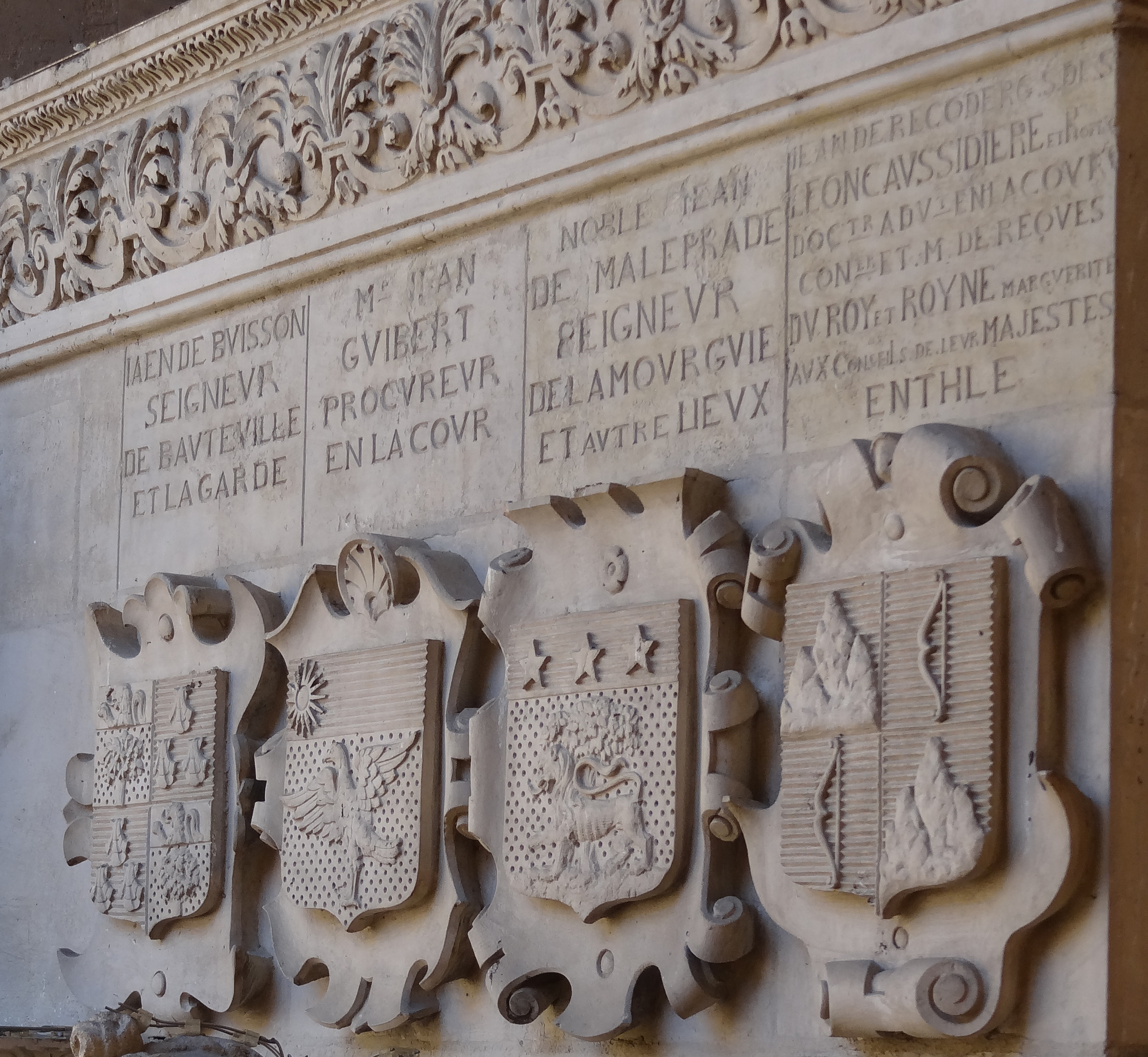
Henry IV courtyard, coat of arms of capitouls.

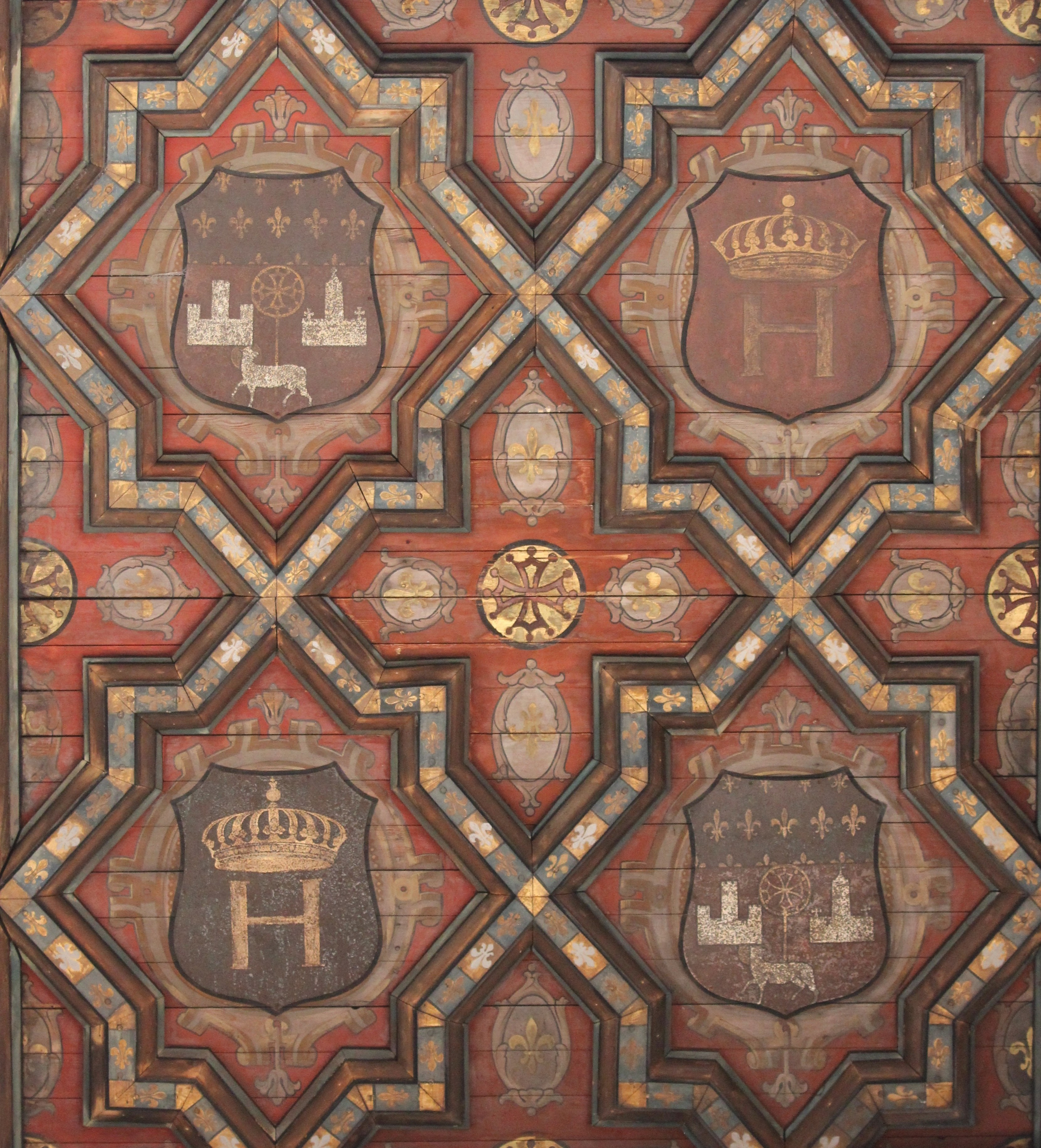
Henry IV courtyard, coats of arms under the awning. The geometric motifs evoke the Mudejar style, but also Serlio's engravings (redesigned after the Renaissance).

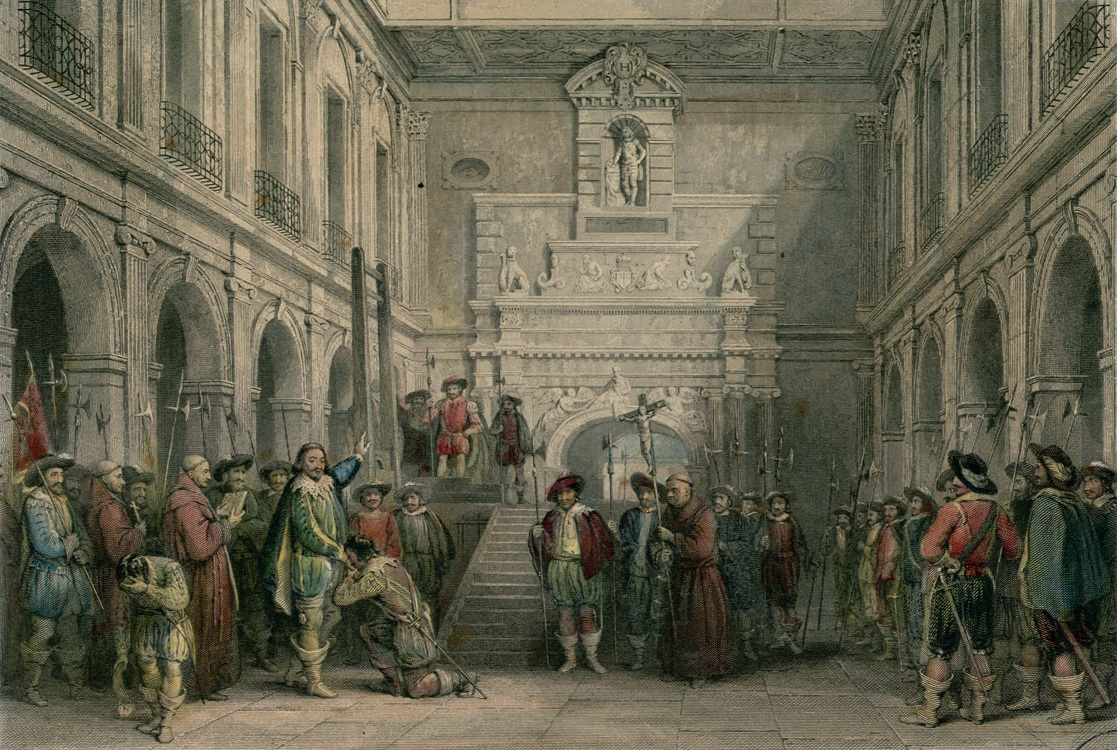
The execution of the Duke of Montmorency in the Henry IV Courtyard in 1632 (19th century illustration).

==== The triumphal portal ====
The triumphal portal of the Henri IV courtyard is a superimposition of various parts successively made by Toulouse Renaissance artists. It was erected on its present site in the early years of the 17th century at the same time as the Henry IV courtyard was built. It is the support of a symbolic language highlighting the greatness of the city and, for its upper part, of the French Crown.

The lower part of the portal was designed by the architect and sculptor Nicolas Bachelier in 1546 on a drawing by Jean Rancy. It originally adorned the vestibule of the Grand Consistory and represents the goddess Pallas, protector of the city in Roman times. It was a prestigious tutelary figure brought to the fore by the capitouls of the Renaissance. Pallas is here surrounded by two winged women: one carrying a staff with the cross of Toulouse (originally it was an owl, an attribute of Pallas), the other brandishing a laurel wreath and a flowering branch.

The middle part of the portal was sculpted by Geoffroy Jarry in 1561, it shows enslaved prisoners surrounding the coat of arms of Toulouse, to symbolise the power of the city as capital of the province of Languedoc. Beneath the sculptures, an inscription added in 1771 announces in Latin the importance of the place: HIC THEMIS DAT JURA CIVIBUS, APOLLO FLORES CAMŒNIS, MINERVA PALMAS ARTIBUS, "Here Themis gives the law to the citizens, Apollo the flowers to the poets, Minerva the palms to the artists".

The upper part of the portal, decorated with the names and coats of arms of the capitouls of the year, is organised around a marble statue of Henry IV, the work of Thomas Heurtematte (1607). The only statue of the king made during his lifetime, it testifies to the Crown's desire to restore the political image of the King of France in an ultra-Catholic city that a few years earlier had violently opposed his accession to the throne. The king is camped laurelled and in armour to exalt his military power and to pose as a peacemaker and protector of Christendom.

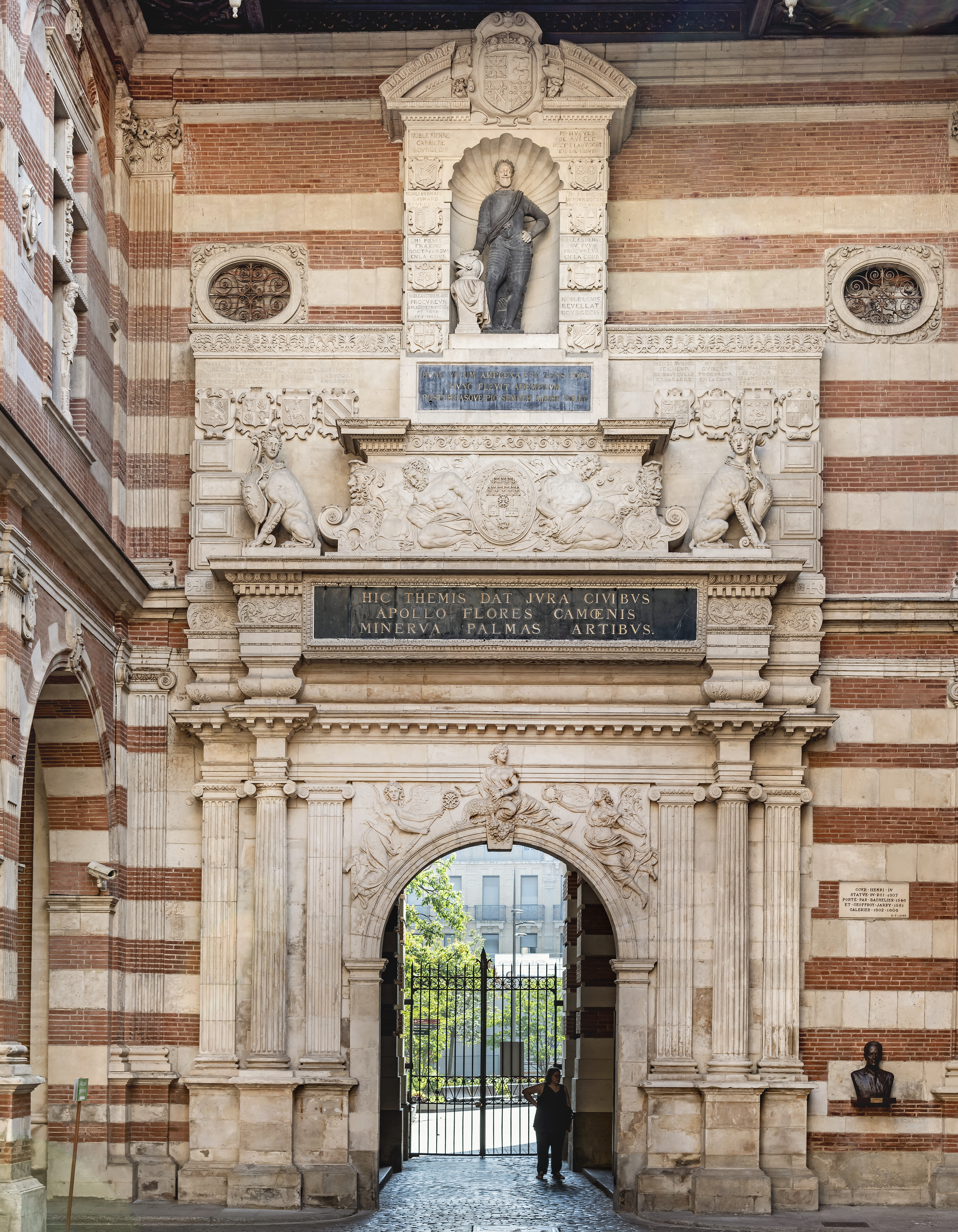
The triumphal portal of Henry IV courtyard.

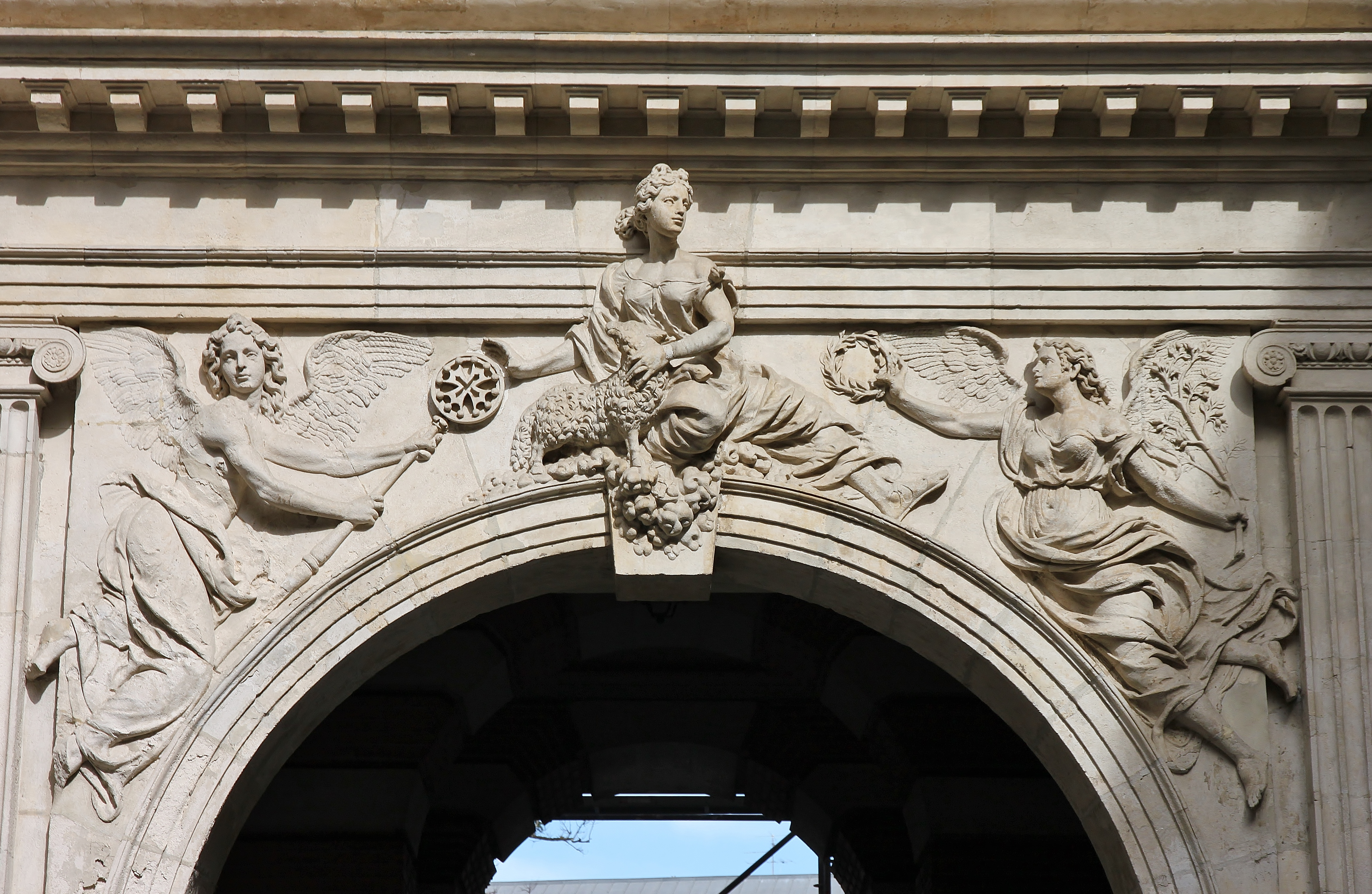
Lower part: Pallas surrounded by two winged female figures (1546).

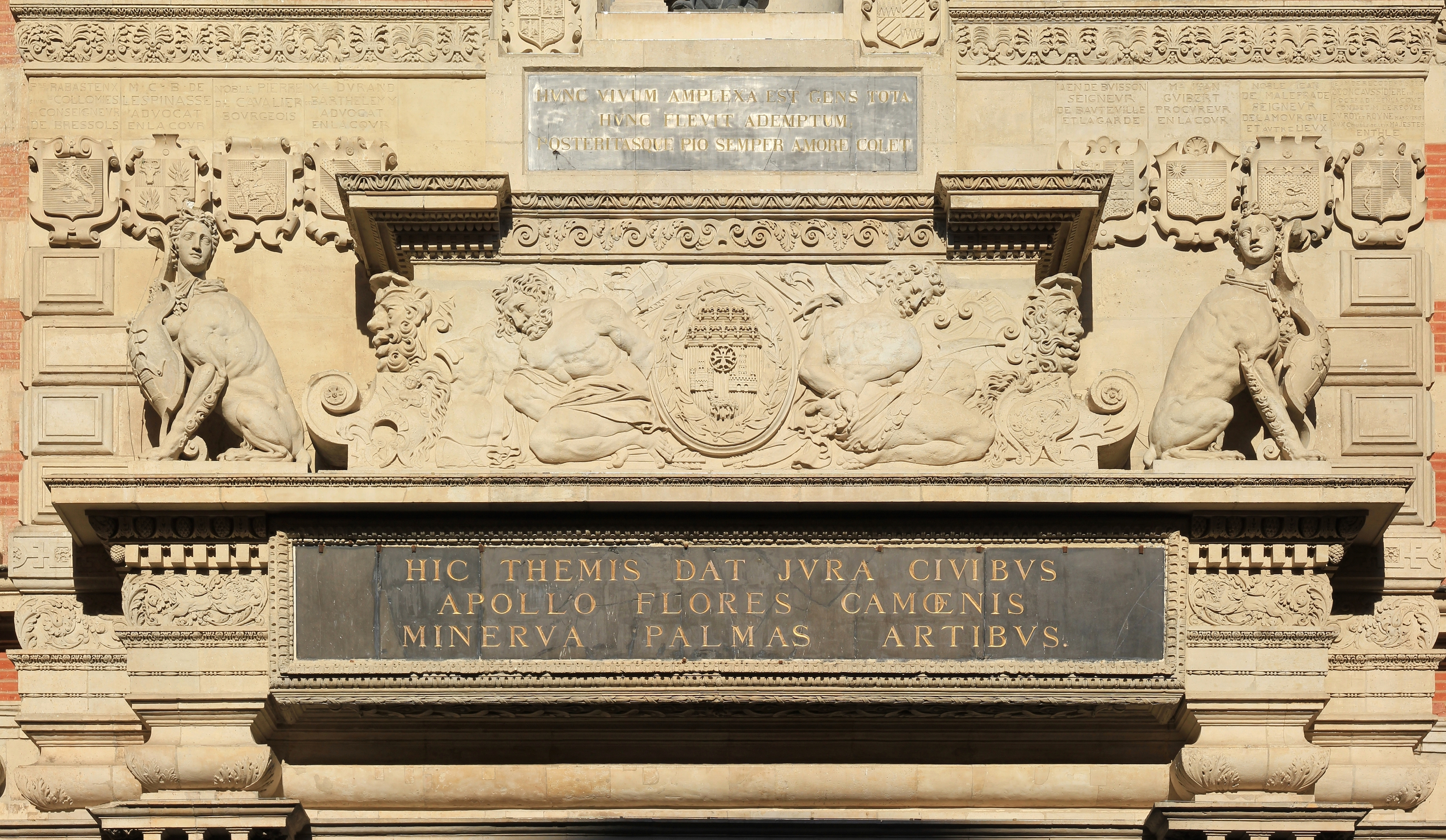
Middle part: captive slaves around the coat of arms of Toulouse (1561).

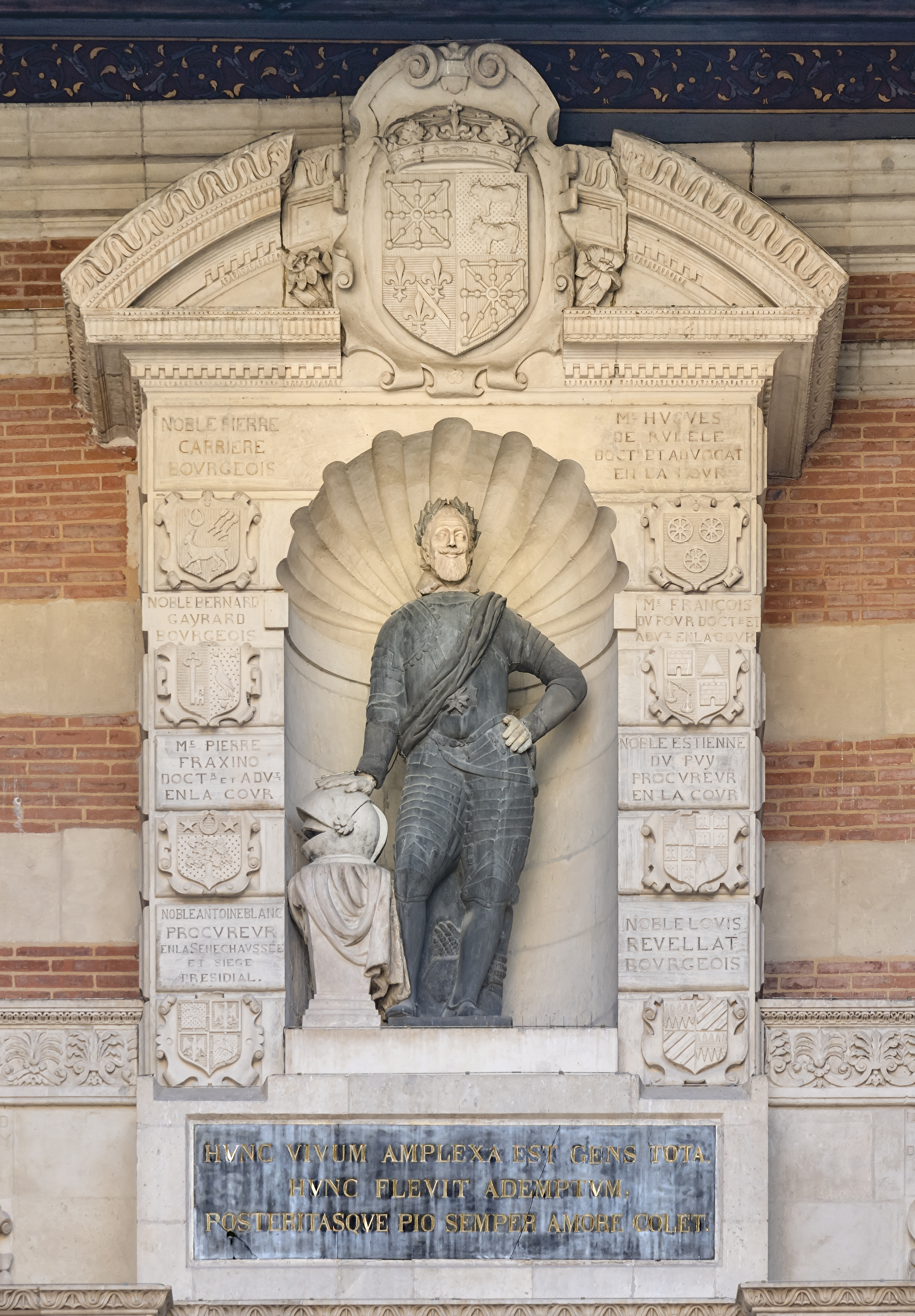
Upper part: the statue of Henry IV in marble from the Pyrenees (1607).

=== The Griffoul fountain ===
As early as 1545, the capitouls undertook major works to restore to working order an ancient Roman aqueduct that led the waters of a high hill to the site of the cathedral. A first public fountain was installed by the sculptor Jean Rancy in 1549, replaced in 1593 by some of the elements of the current fountain: an obelisk in red marble from Cierp (in the Pyrenees), placed on a pedestal dug out of four niches housing bronze children each holding a ewer and urinating like Manneken Pis. In 1649, vandalized, they were restored by Pierre Affre who replaced the ewers by snakes. It is only in the 19th century that the children were slightly modified so as not to offend against modesty. Other elements were added or replaced over the centuries (as illustrated by the multiplication of dates on the various parts of the fountain).

Symbol of the capitouls' euergetism, during centuries this fountain was the only one to give water in Toulouse, supplemented by wells (often infected) and water carriers getting their supplies from the Garonne river. The spectacular wear of its stone coping testifies to its prolonged and intensive use.

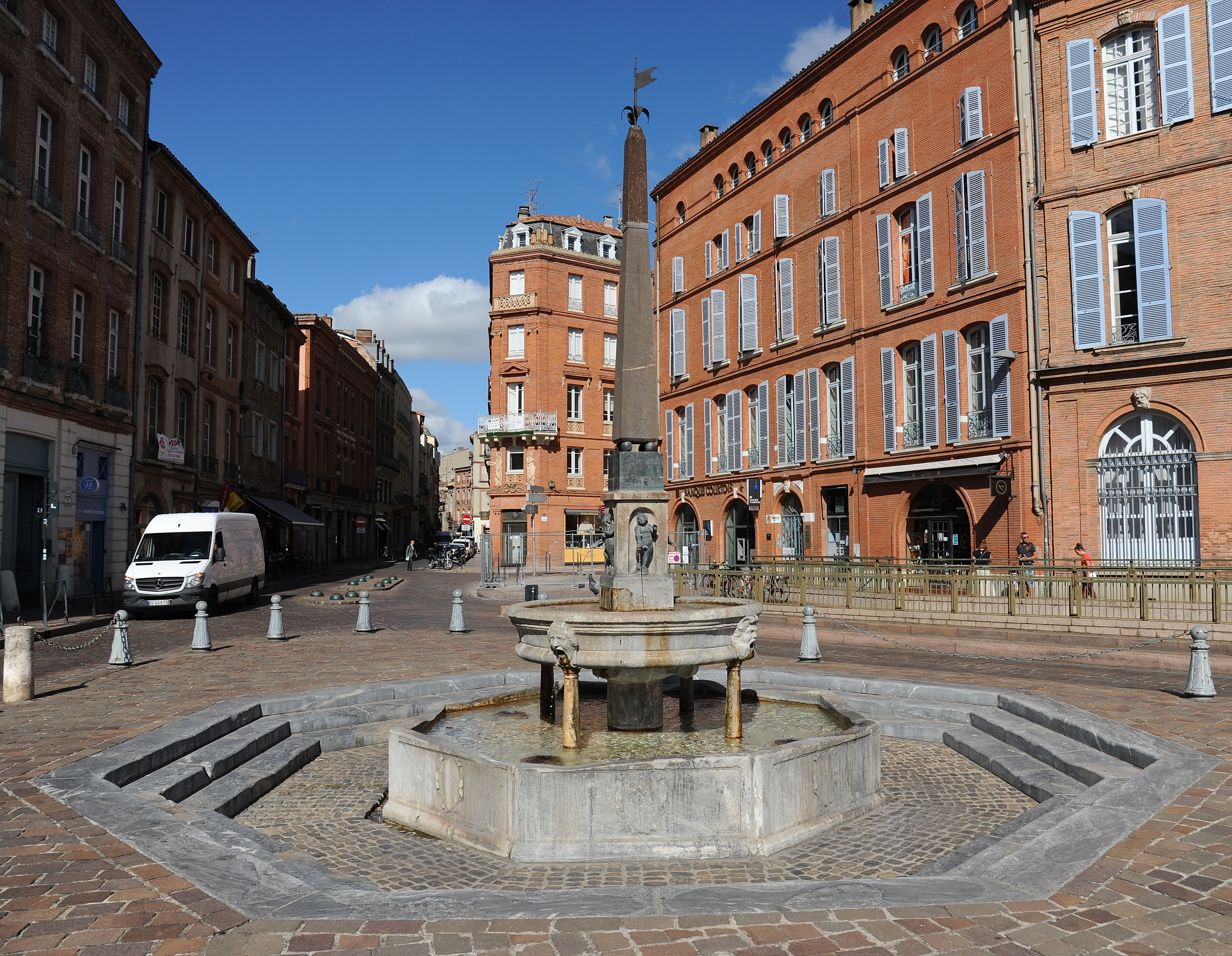
The Griffoul fountain.

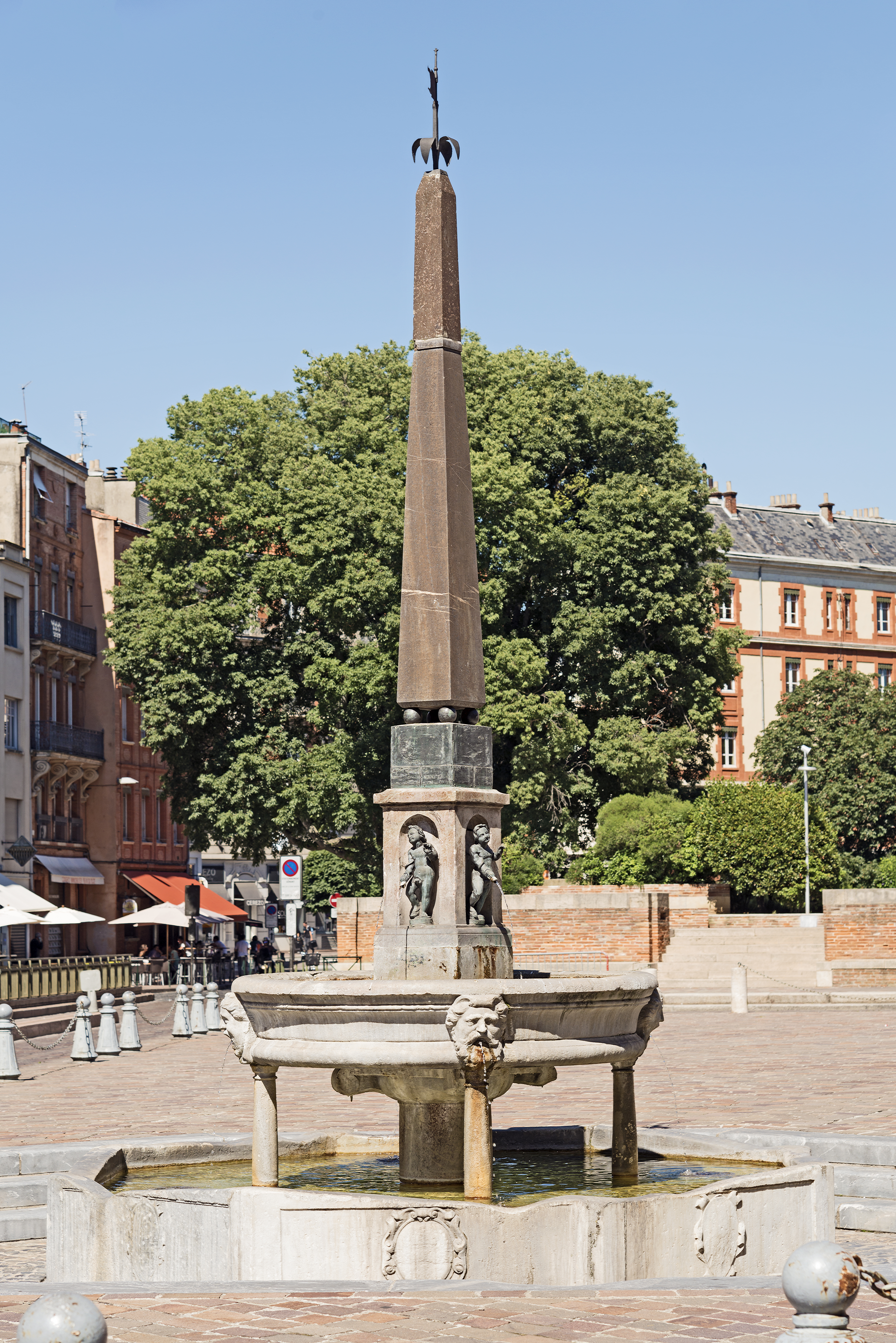

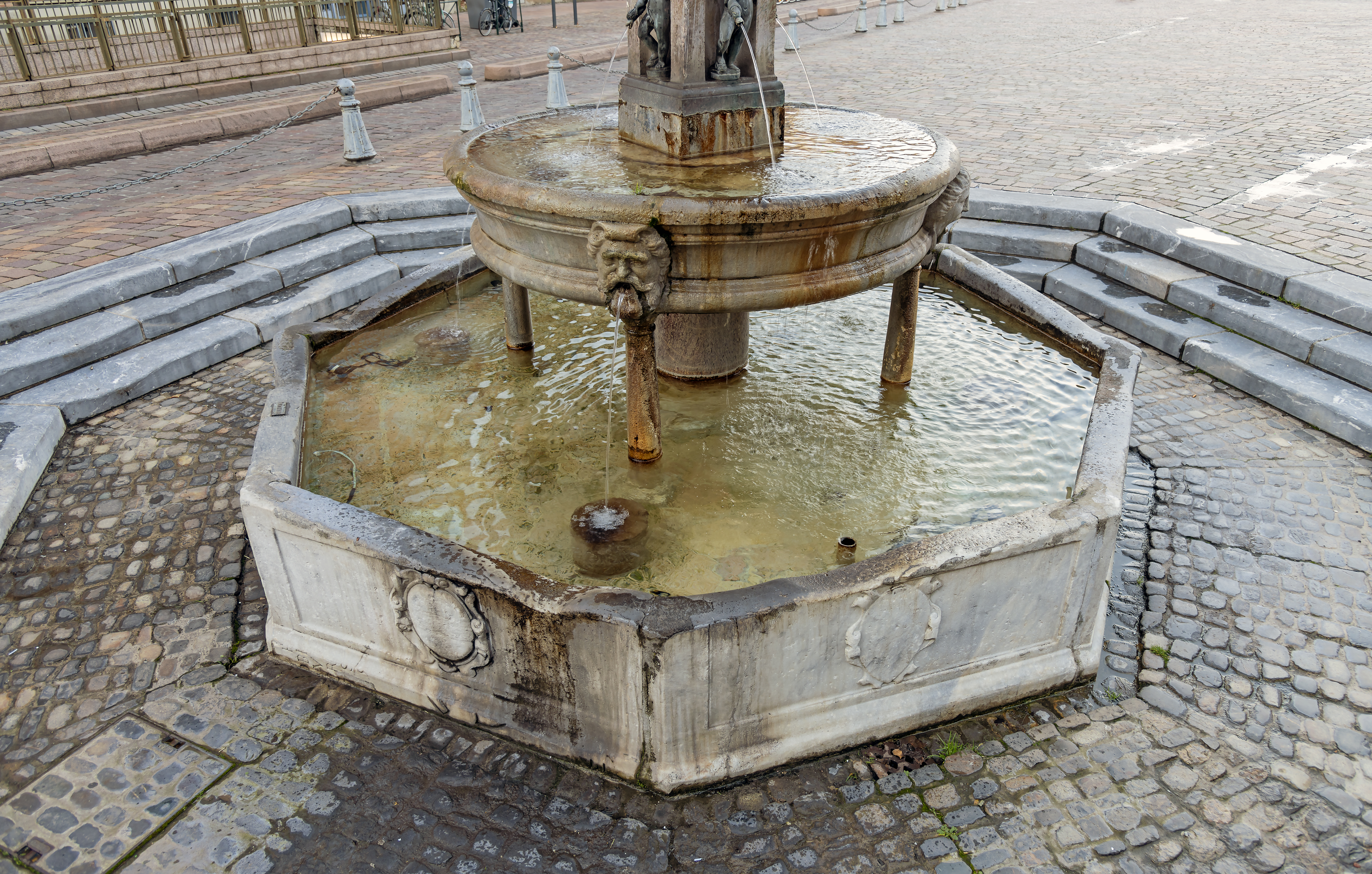
Detail of the tank and washbasin.

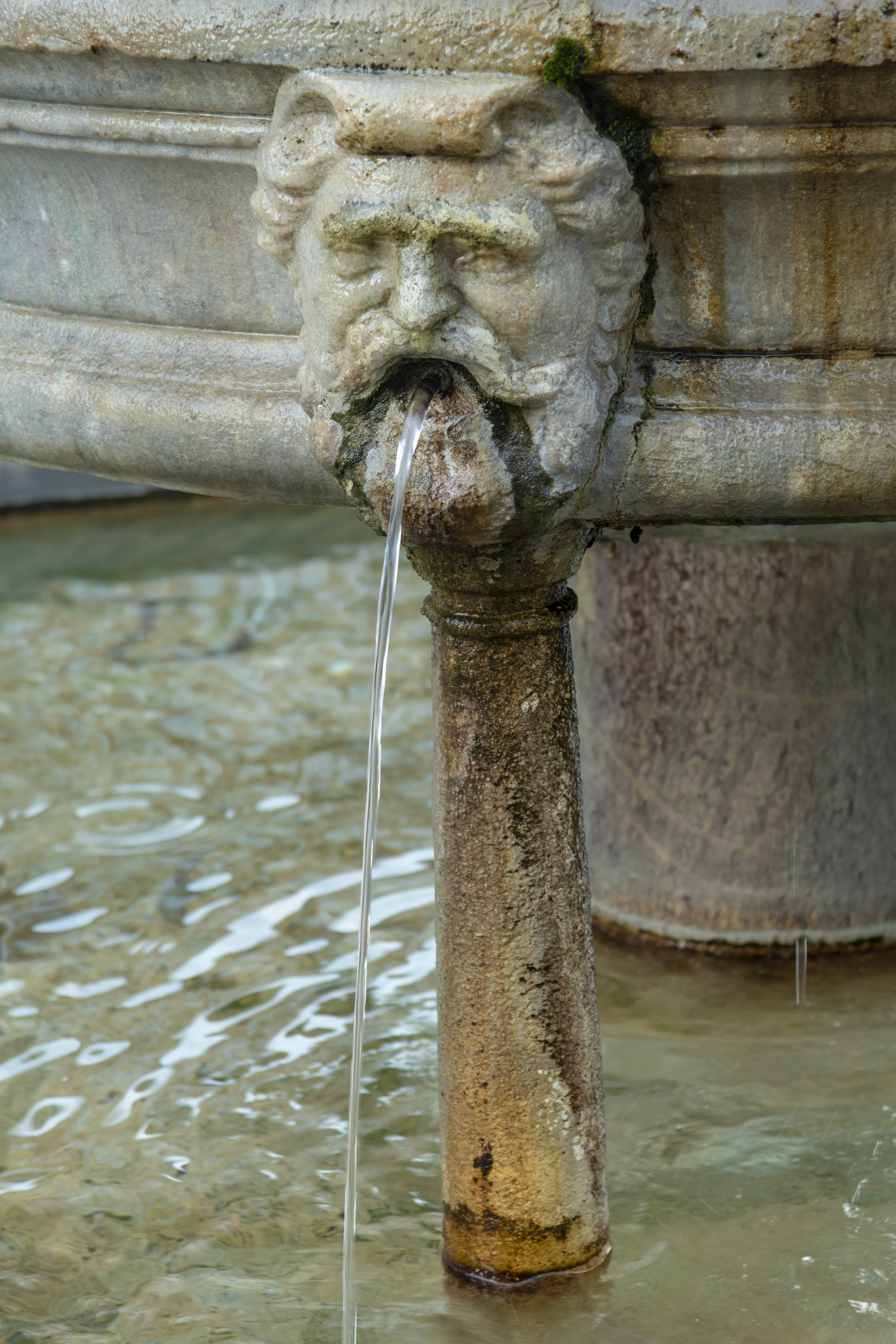
Mascaron and small column.

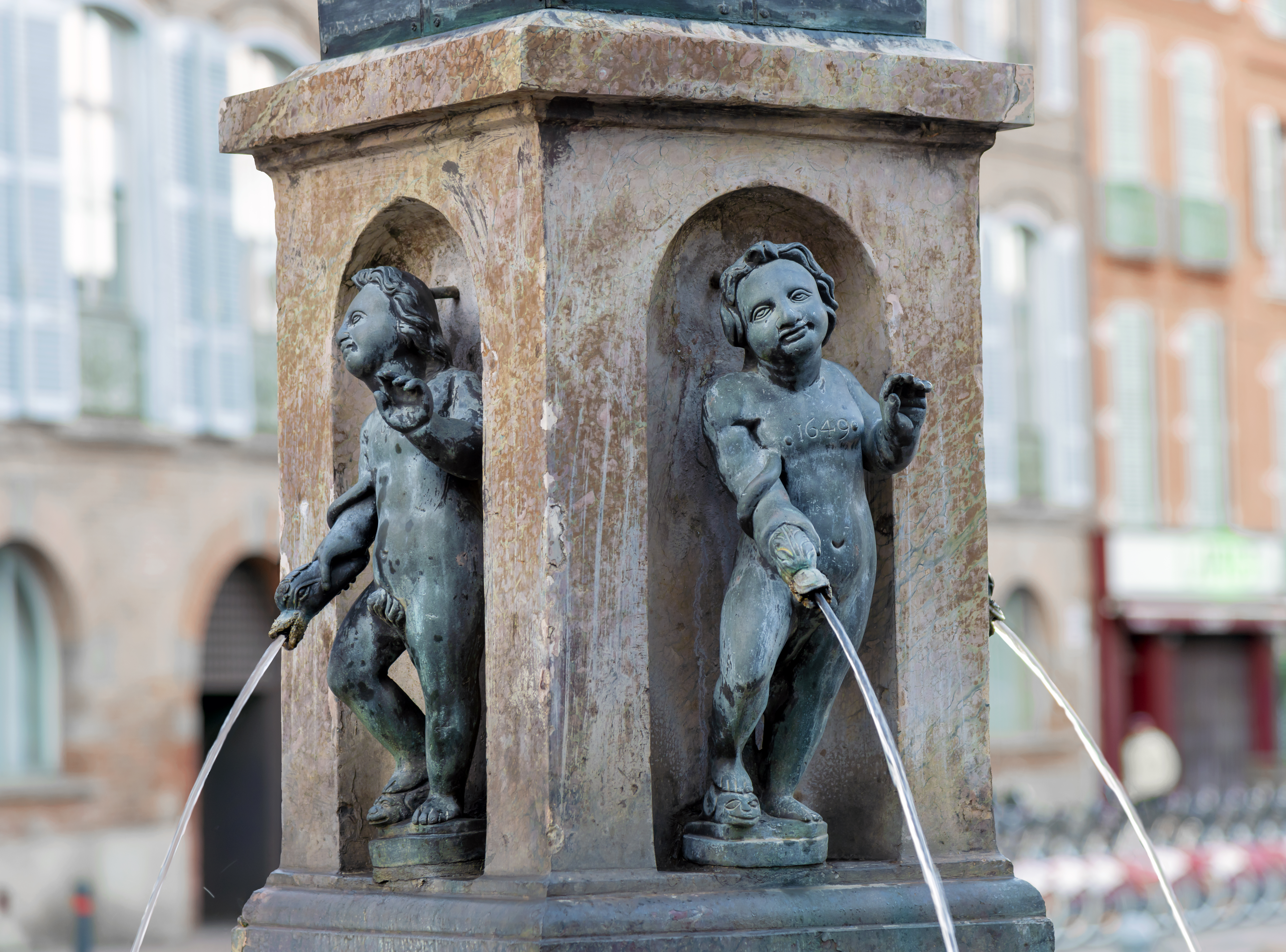
Bronze children.

== Pont-Neuf ==
Throughout its history, Toulouse was the rear base for military operations against Spain and for the troops that guarded the border. For this reason the city was, for example, equipped with a large arsenal.

It was in 1541, under the impulse of King Francis I, who had some reason to be wary of the conquering Spain of Charles V, that the construction of the Pont-Neuf was decided upon with the strategic aim of ensuring the passage of troops from one side of the Garonne to the other in all weathers. The king authorized the levying of a special tax on the region for this purpose, but money often ran out and its construction, which began before 1545, was not completed until 1632.

The great masters active in Toulouse at the beginning of the construction site, the sculptor Jean Rancy, the painter Bernard Nalot, the architects Louis Privat, Nicolas Bachelier, and then Dominique Bertin and Dominique Bachelier worked alongside experts in hydraulic engineering who were called in to develop new foundation processes in aquatic environments. Later, Pierre Souffron met the young Jacques Lemercier and François Mansart. This construction site was therefore a place of emulation, exchange and training, with a national and even European influence: at the request of King Philip II of Spain, Dominique Bachelier went to Saragossa in 1584 to repair the bridge linking the banks of the Ebro River. The Pont-Neuf proved its solidity and the relevance of the technical solutions adopted by being the only bridge in Toulouse to withstand the great flood of the Garonne in 1875.

The architect Jacques Lemercier, who gave a decisive impulse to the construction and generalized the vast basket-handle arches allowing to cross the river without excessive difference in level, made the synthesis between bridges of the Roman antiquity, for the use of the superimposed spouts intended to spread the water and for the openings on the piers, and works of the Italian Renaissance such as the ponte Sisto in Rome for its oculus or the ponte Santa Trinita in Florence for the lowering of the arches. Finally, by removing the housing on the bridge, it has definitively broken with the past, delivering the entire deck to traffic, as at the Pont Neuf in Paris and the Châtellerault Bridge. With them, the Toulouse bridge belongs to a new generation of innovative structures.

The Pont-Neuf was therefore the great ambition of the Toulouse Renaissance, both because of the scale and difficulty of the project and for the skills gathered over nearly a century, which made the site an exceptional human and technical adventure. Its symbolic importance was exploited by the royal power: Henry IV wanted to exhibit his sculpted effigy, while the equestrian portrait of Louis XIII crowned the triumphal arch that stood until the 19th century at the entrance of the bridge, on the left bank.

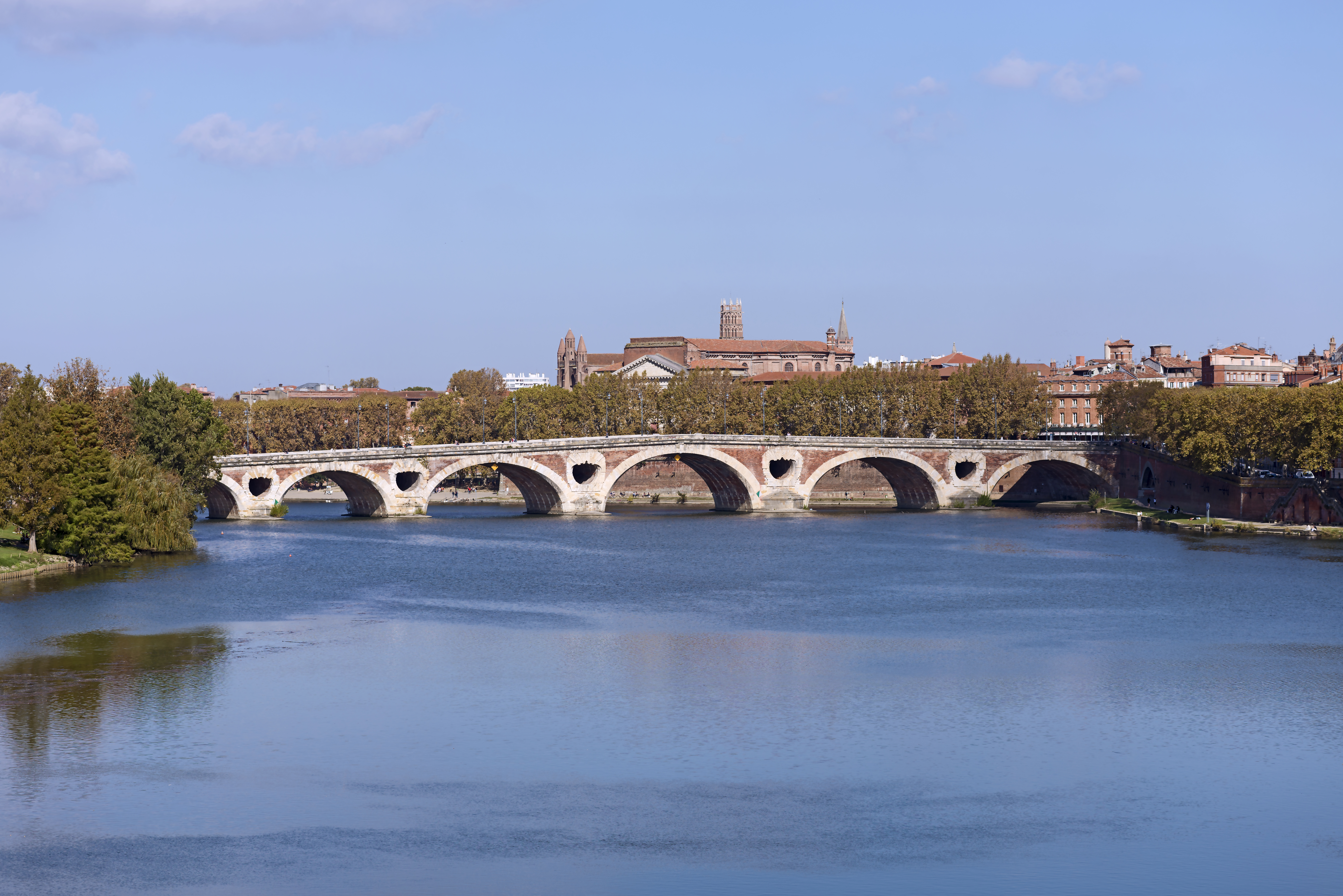
The Pont-Neuf allows to cross the 220 meters of the river. It was, until the opening of the Pont de pierre in Bordeaux in 1822, the only permanent bridge over the Garonne.

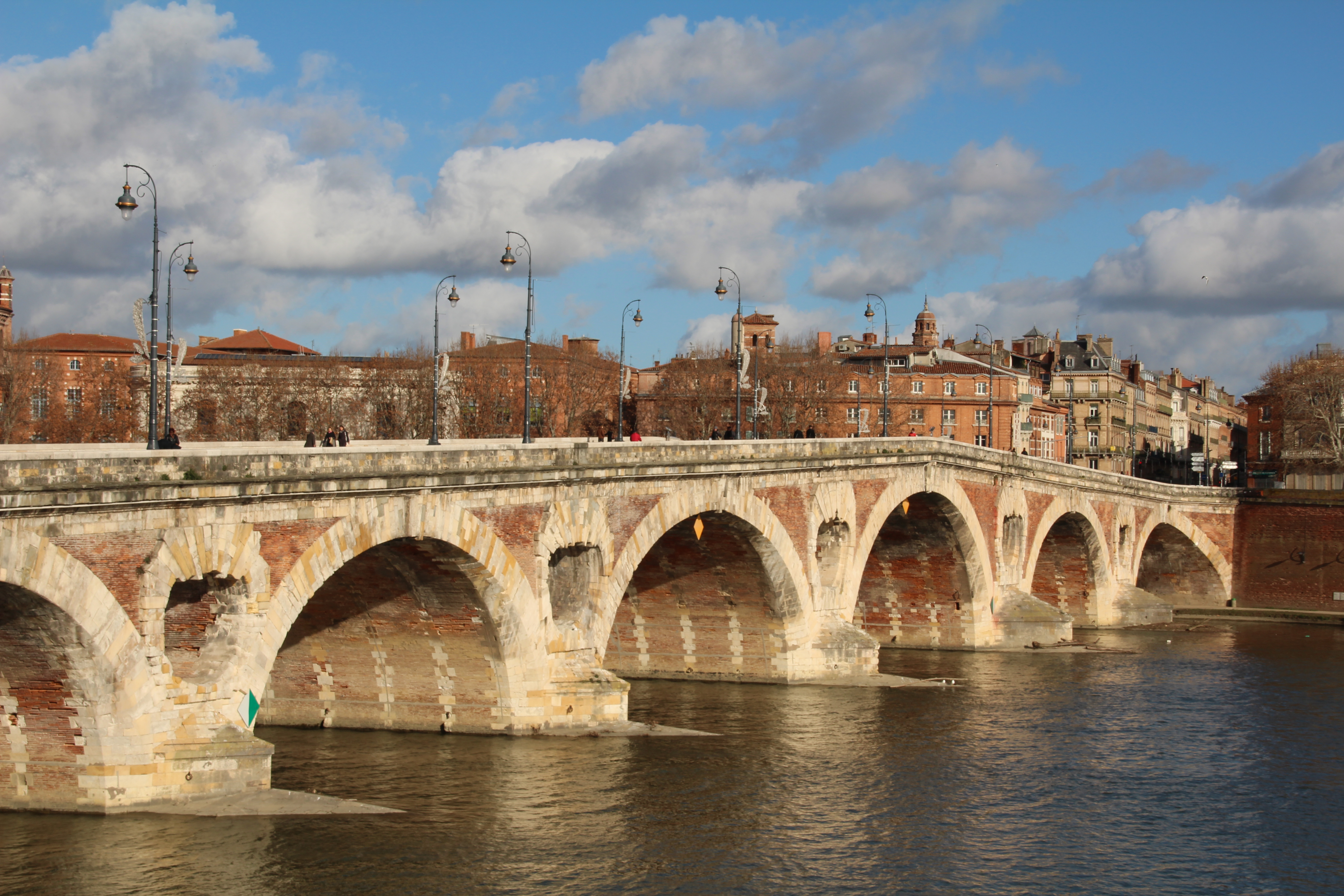
Its arches in the shape of a basket-handle (i.e. wider than high) allow less piles and/or a more moderate gradient.

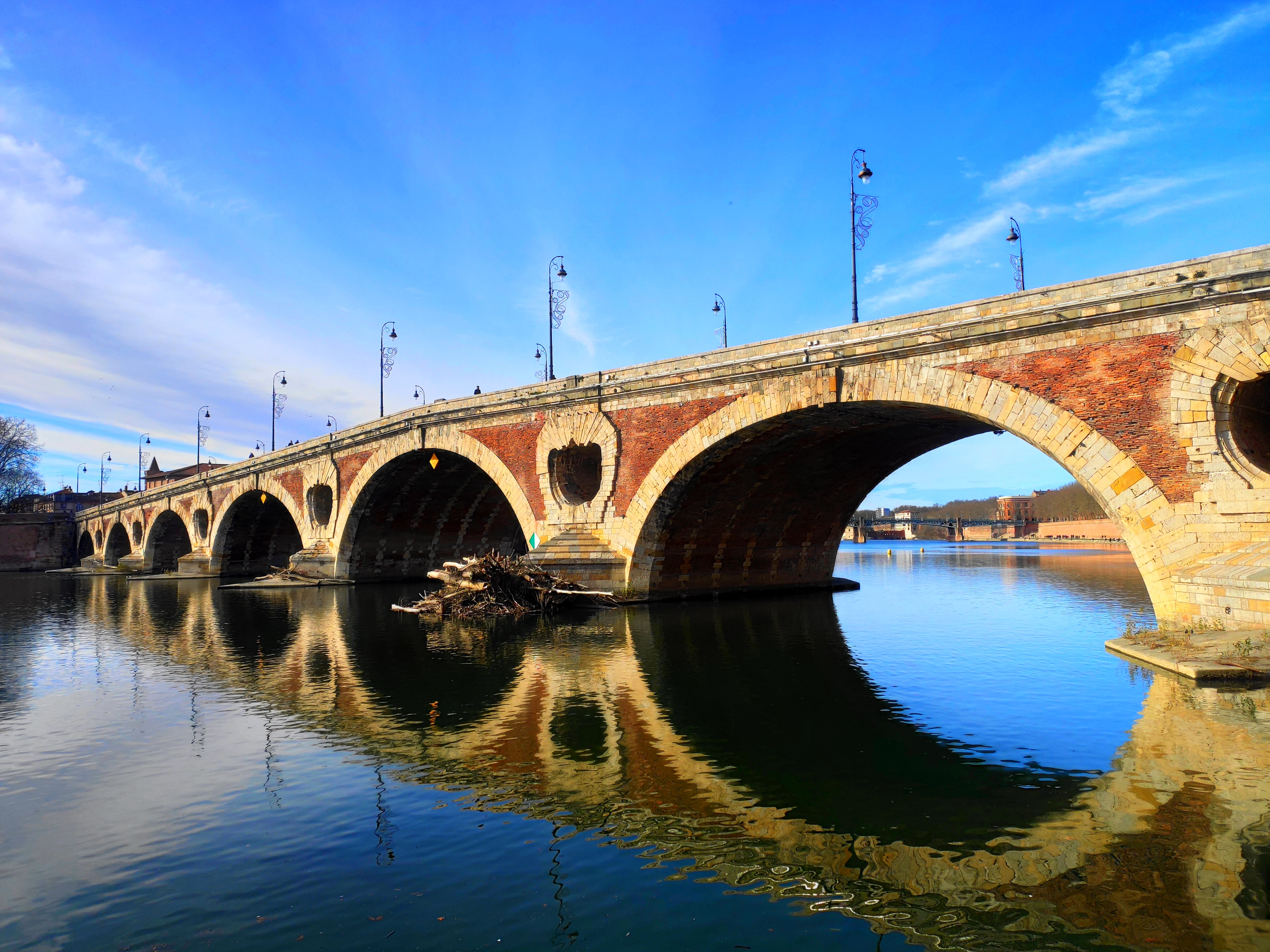
The largest of the seven arches has a span of 37 meters.

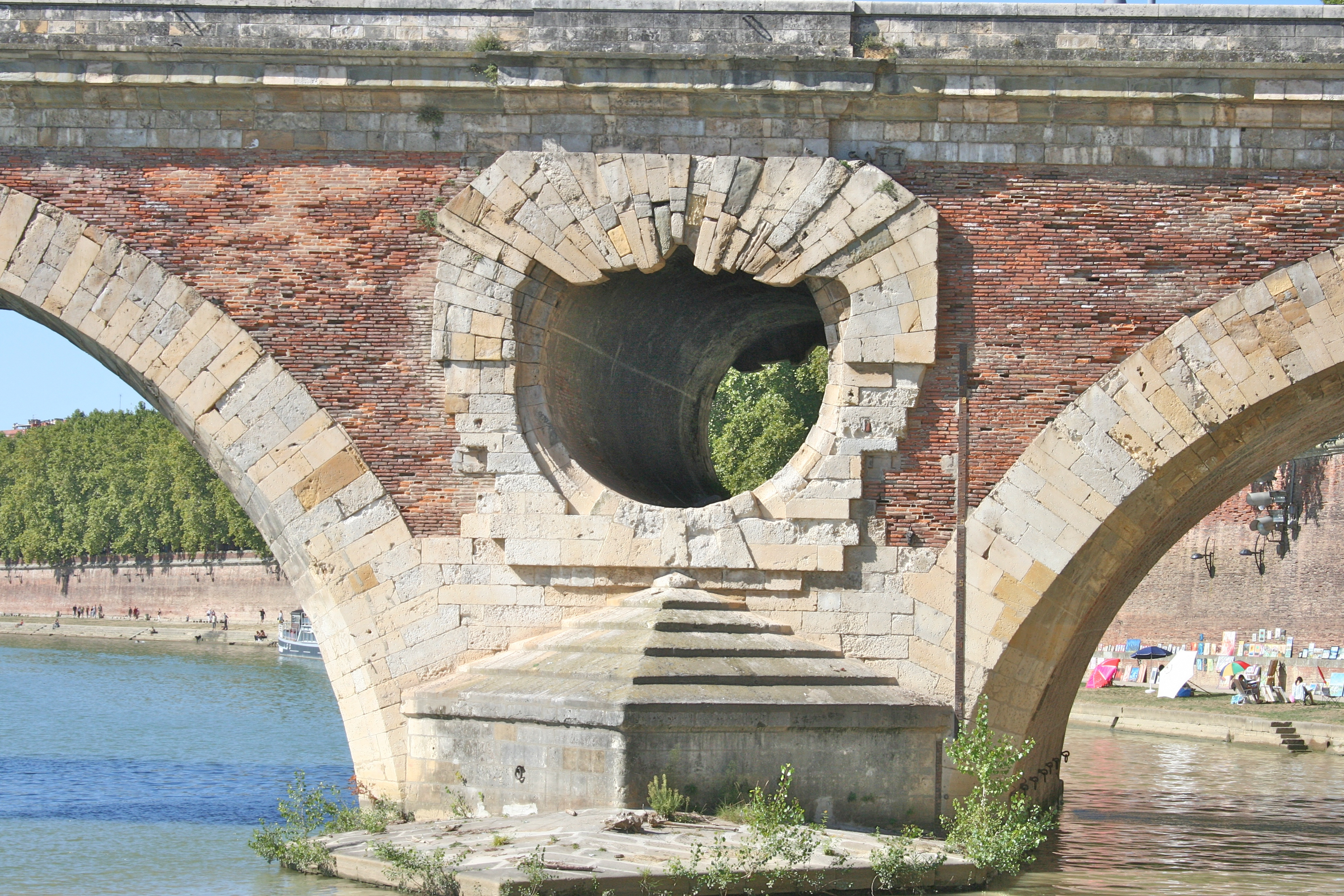
The bridge is equipped with crests in front of each pier to separate the flows, and openings allowing water to pass through even when it reaches the top of the arches.

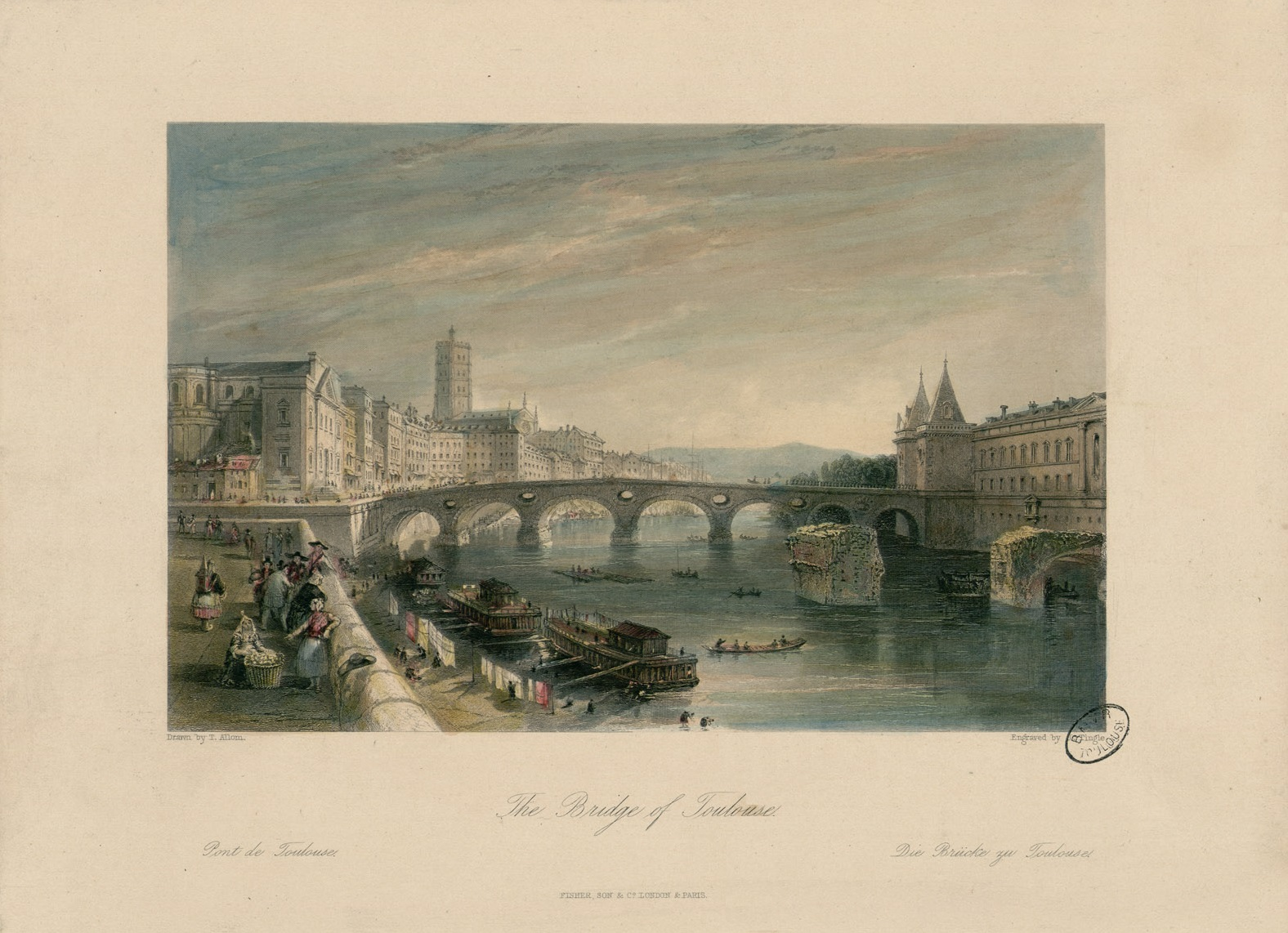
This drawing shows the pavilions framing the triumphal arch (right), they were destroyed in the 19th century to make more place for traffic.

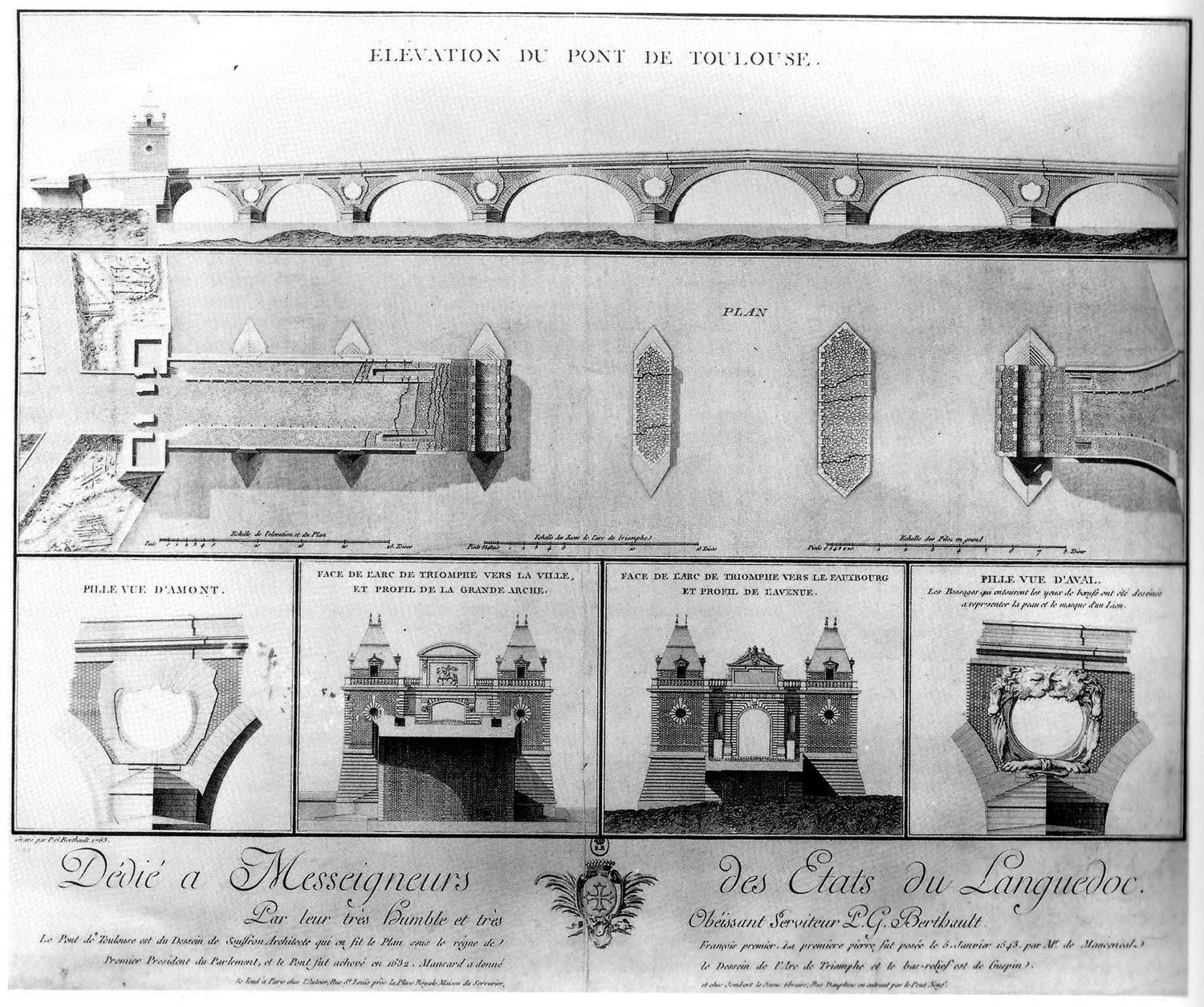
Engraving from 1783 showing the plan of the bridge, the demolished triumphal arch and the planned decorations.

== Hôtels particuliers (townhouses) ==
In France, and contrary to Italy for example, the term "palace" is generally reserved for the residences of kings or princes. The urban residences of the elite of non-royal descent are therefore often referred to as "hôtels particuliers". But these hôtels can be of very different sizes and natures, designating the homes of wealthy bourgeois as well as those of the high nobility. It is therefore generally accepted that they can be described as townhouses of a grand sort.

=== Patrons: Great merchants and members of the Parlement ===
For a long time, Toulouse historiography linked the architectural quality of the Renaissance hôtels particuliers to the sole trade of woad (pastel). This blue dye, exported to the major textile centers of Western Europe, was indeed the source of prosperity for a few great merchants who settled in Toulouse between the Great Fire of 1463 and the beginning of the French Wars of Religion in 1562.

Originating from Spain, Italy, the Flanders, Rouergue, Languedoc, or the Basque Country, the actors of this merchant elite were actually few in number. Indeed, although it sometimes offered considerable profitability, the woad trade was extremely speculative and required the immobilization of significant capital over the long term (four years on average between sowing and payment). Consequently, only about twenty merchants were able to rise to the rank of actors in this international trade. Of the heritage they left behind, little remains today except for a small handful of mansions, including two of the most remarkable examples of urban Renaissance architecture in France: the hôtels of Jean de Bernuy and Pierre d'Assézat.

The brilliance of these two buildings alone has undoubtedly contributed to overestimating the role of woad in the prosperity of Toulouse in the 16th century. For, far from being the work of the woad merchants, the majority of the Renaissance hôtels particuliers in Toulouse were built by other classes of the population: merchants for whom woad was not the main activity, and especially magistrates, members of the Nobles of the Robe which then constituted the most prestigious and influential social class in the city.

The successful bourgeois in Toulouse commerce most often aspired to become capitouls, an ennobling municipal office that then allowed their descendants, after law studies, to accede to a career in the Parlement of Toulouse. Thus, no great merchant dynasty emerged in Toulouse; the spectacular economic successes of the Renaissance were often the work of men of a single generation who, once ennobled, destined their children for a legal career with a Parlement that made Toulouse the judicial capital of a large part of Southern France.

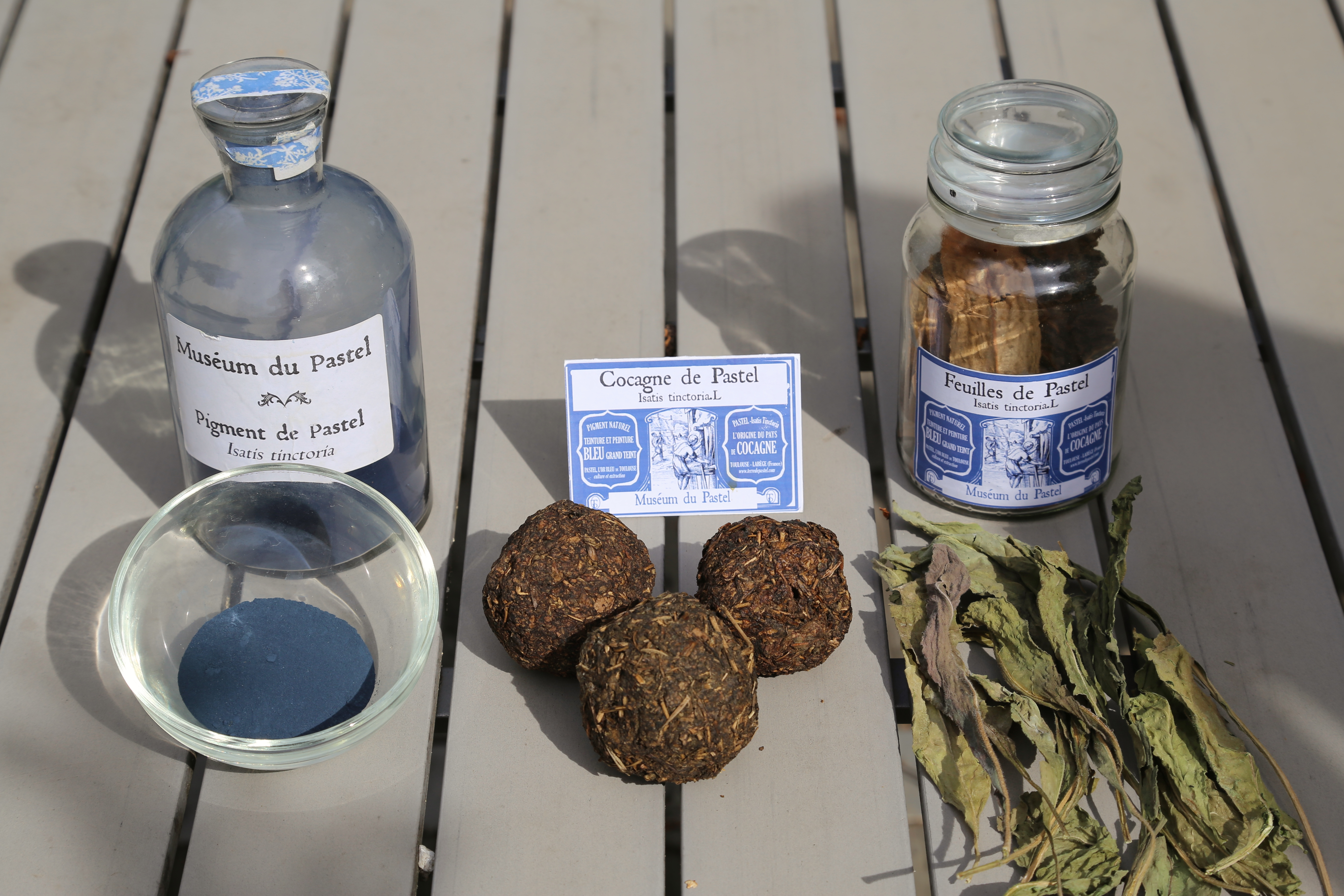
In the Renaissance, Toulouse woad merchants exported their blue dye throughout Western Europe.

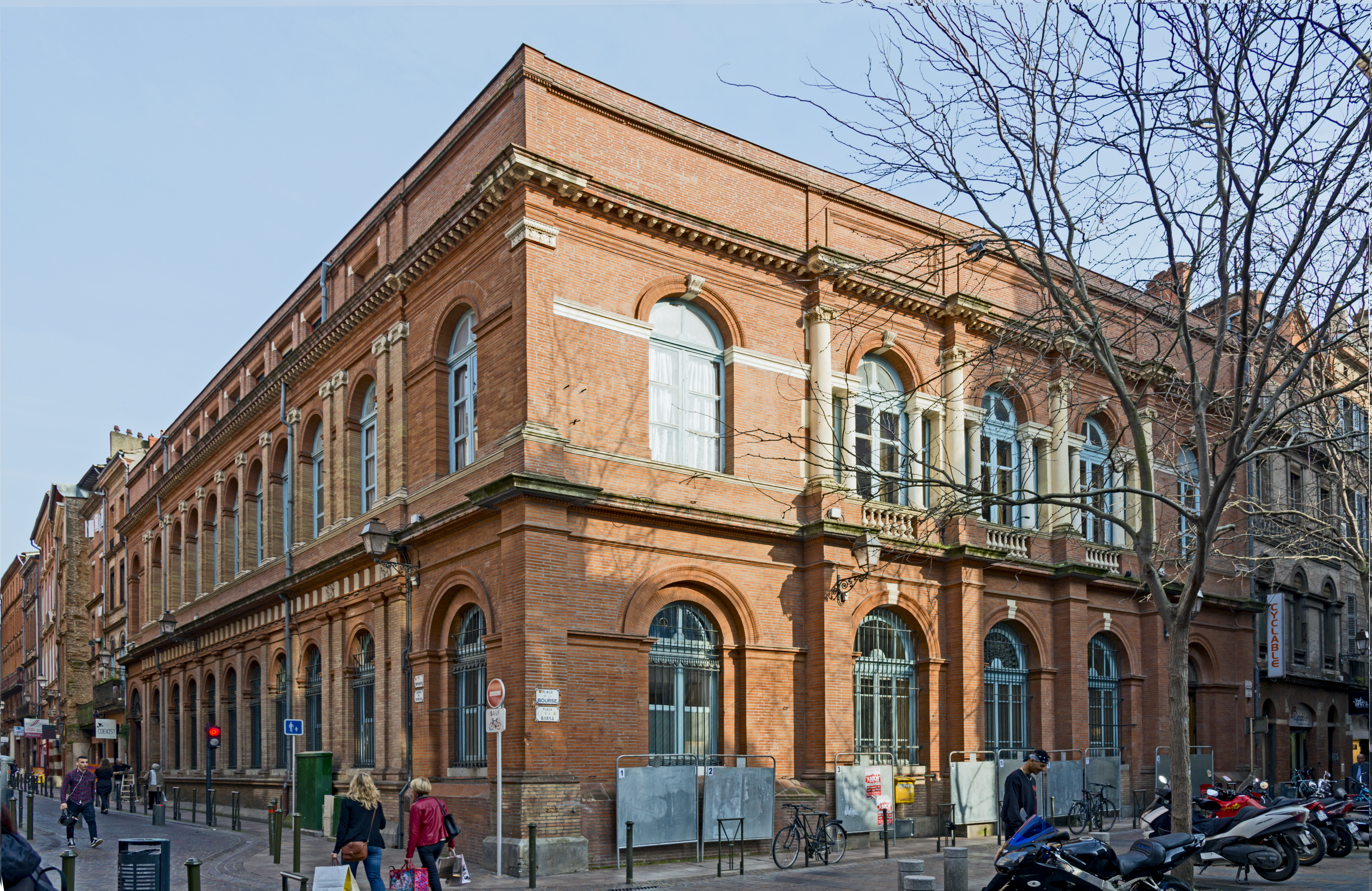
Testimony to Toulouse’s commercial vitality in the 16th century: in 1549 one of the first merchants’ exchanges in France was created (the current building dates from the 19th century).

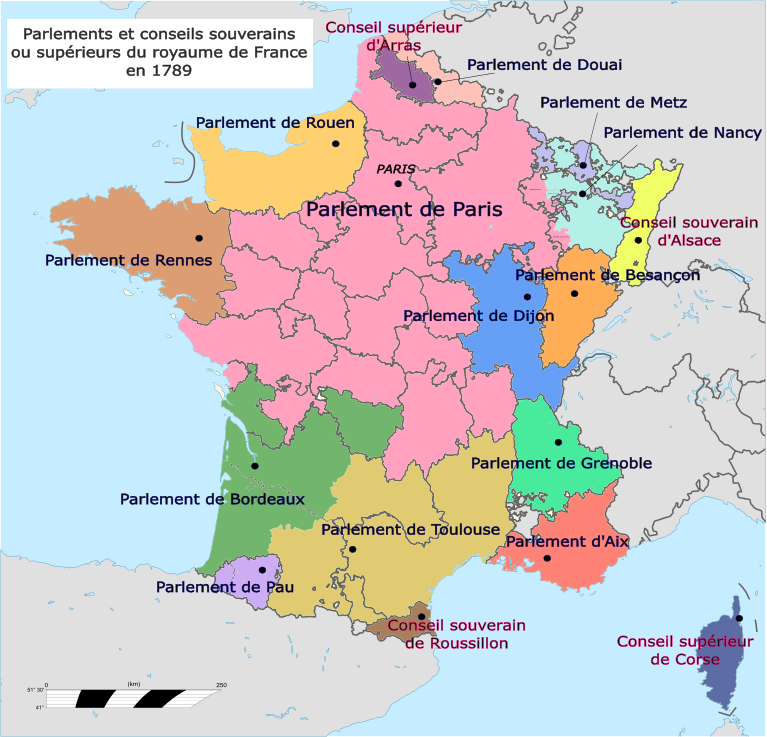
From 1443 to 1790 the Parlement of Toulouse was the second most important and oldest in the kingdom after that of Paris (map of 1789).

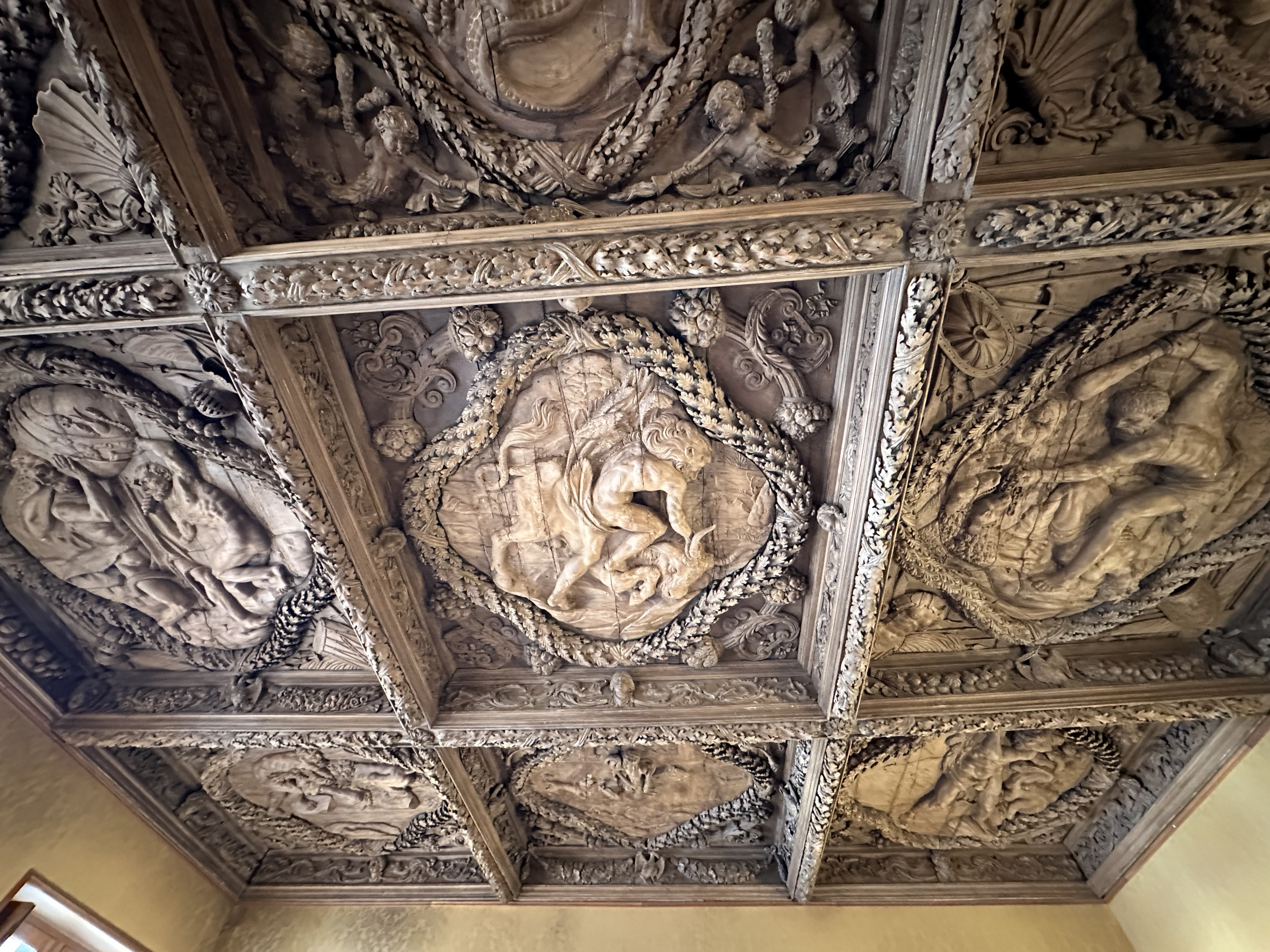
Coffered ceiling of the Salon d’Hercule at the Parlement of Toulouse, work of the sons of the sculptor Artus Legoust (17th century).

=== A learned architecture at the disposal of architects and humanists ===
It was through the diffusion of engravings of the monuments of Rome as well as the publication of architectural treatises such as those of Serlio, Alberti or Vitruvius, that the Renaissance architectural vocabulary that had developed in Italy during the Quattrocento (15th century) made its appearance in the private architecture of Toulouse from the first decades of the 16th century. Initially characterised by a French First Renaissance decor inspired by the Loire Valley, it then moved on a classical development which flourished spectacularly at the Hôtel d'Assézat. At the same time, Mannerist influences from the royal castles of Madrid, the Louvre and Fontainebleau influenced Toulouse's architecture until the years 1610–1620.

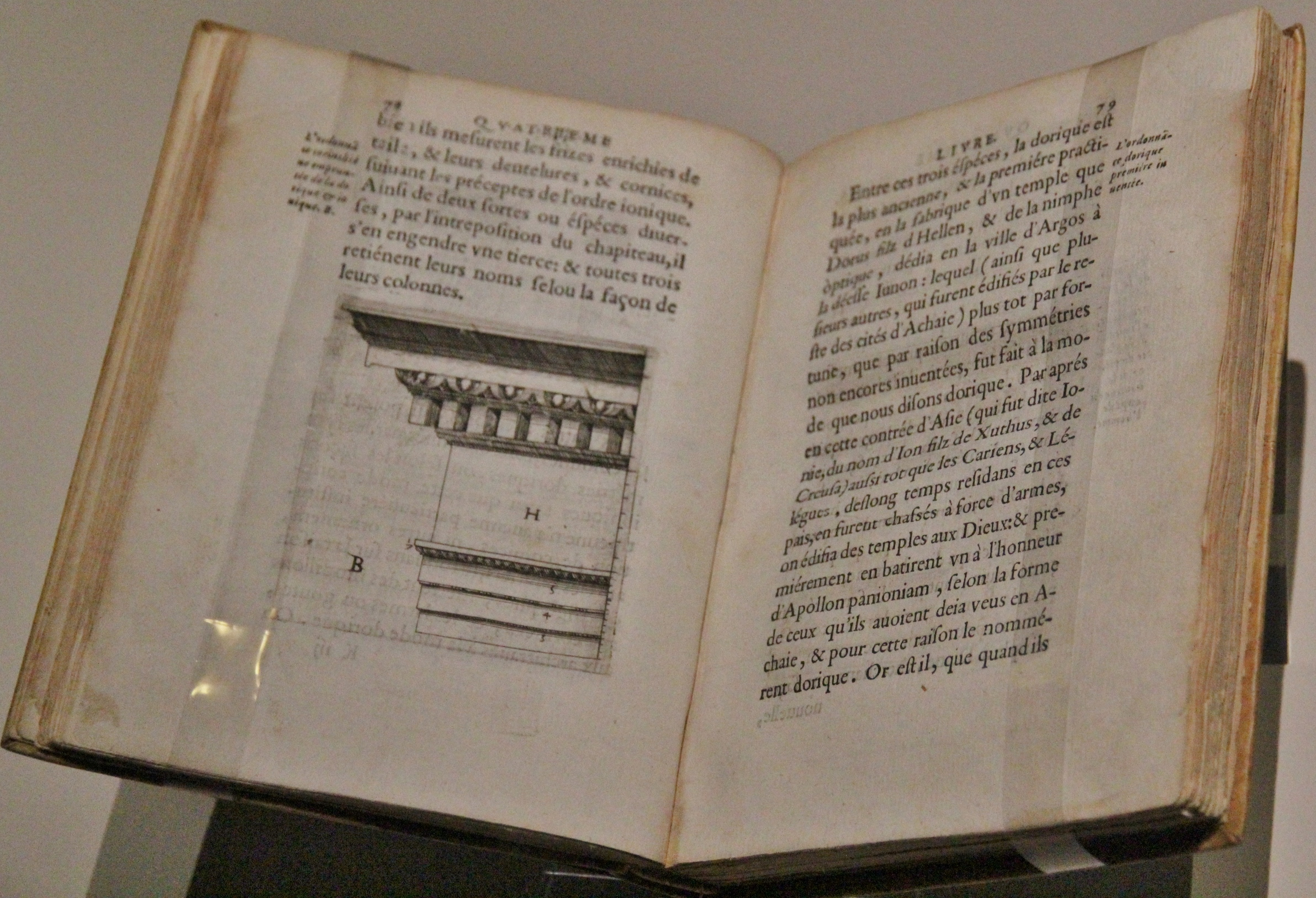
The architect Dominique Bertin produced a Toulouse edition of Vitruvius, illustrated and commented to make its content more accessible to craftsmen (1556-1559).

Architects such as Louis Privat, Nicolas Bachelier, then Dominique Bachelier, Dominique Bertin and Pierre Souffron built prestigious hotels for demanding clients who expected them to be up to date with the latest innovations, with particular attention to royal fashion.

However, architects were not the only ones to have an understanding of architectural culture, and personalities from Toulouse's humanist milieu also worked on the building sites. The jurisconsult Jean de Boyssoné, his cousin Jean Albert, prior of La Réole, and the poet and man of law Pierre Trassebot distinguished themselves by their conception of architecture "à l'antique". Years before Serlio's first publications (1537), Sagredo's translation into French (1536) or the early career of Philibert de l'Orme in Lyon (1536), which are reputed to have been at the origin of the diffusion of classical architecture in France, the humanist Jean de Pins, bishop of Rieux and brilliant diplomat, made the first use of the architectural orders in Toulouse (Ionic order) in the construction of his hôtel.

=== List of hôtels particuliers ===
Renowned for the quality of their architecture, the hôtels particuliers of the Toulouse Renaissance that have survived to the present day testify to the vitality and evolution of architectural tastes in Toulouse over more than a century (around 1515–1620).

==== Hôtel d’Assézat ====
Address: 7 place d’Assézat.

Pierre d'Assézat made his fortune from the woad trade, becoming a leading international merchant. Because of its scale, exceptional décor and fine state of preservation, his hôtel appears in all surveys of French Renaissance architecture.

Mason Jean Castagné and architect Nicolas Bachelier carried out the first campaign in 1555–1557, erecting the two classical façades forming the L-shaped main body. Bays are framed by paired columns with superposed Doric, Ionic and Corinthian orders. Inspired by great ancient models like the Colosseum and by Serlio’s treatises, the capitals consistently reproduce the most sophisticated known antique expressions.

Interrupted by the deaths of Bachelier (1556) and Castagné (1557), the site resumed in 1560 under architect Dominique Bachelier, Nicolas’s son. Favoring Mannerist aesthetics and brick-and-stone polychromy, he closed the courtyard with a loggia and gallery. The latter, supported by large consoles richly decorated, is rhythmically pierced by arches adorned with diamond points in stone.

Dominique Bachelier also made the monumental entrance portal, taken from Serlio’s Extraordinary Book. The Doric pilasters with diamond points and the delicately ornamented Ionic pilasters around the mullioned window lend a precious quality evoking both power and refined erudition.

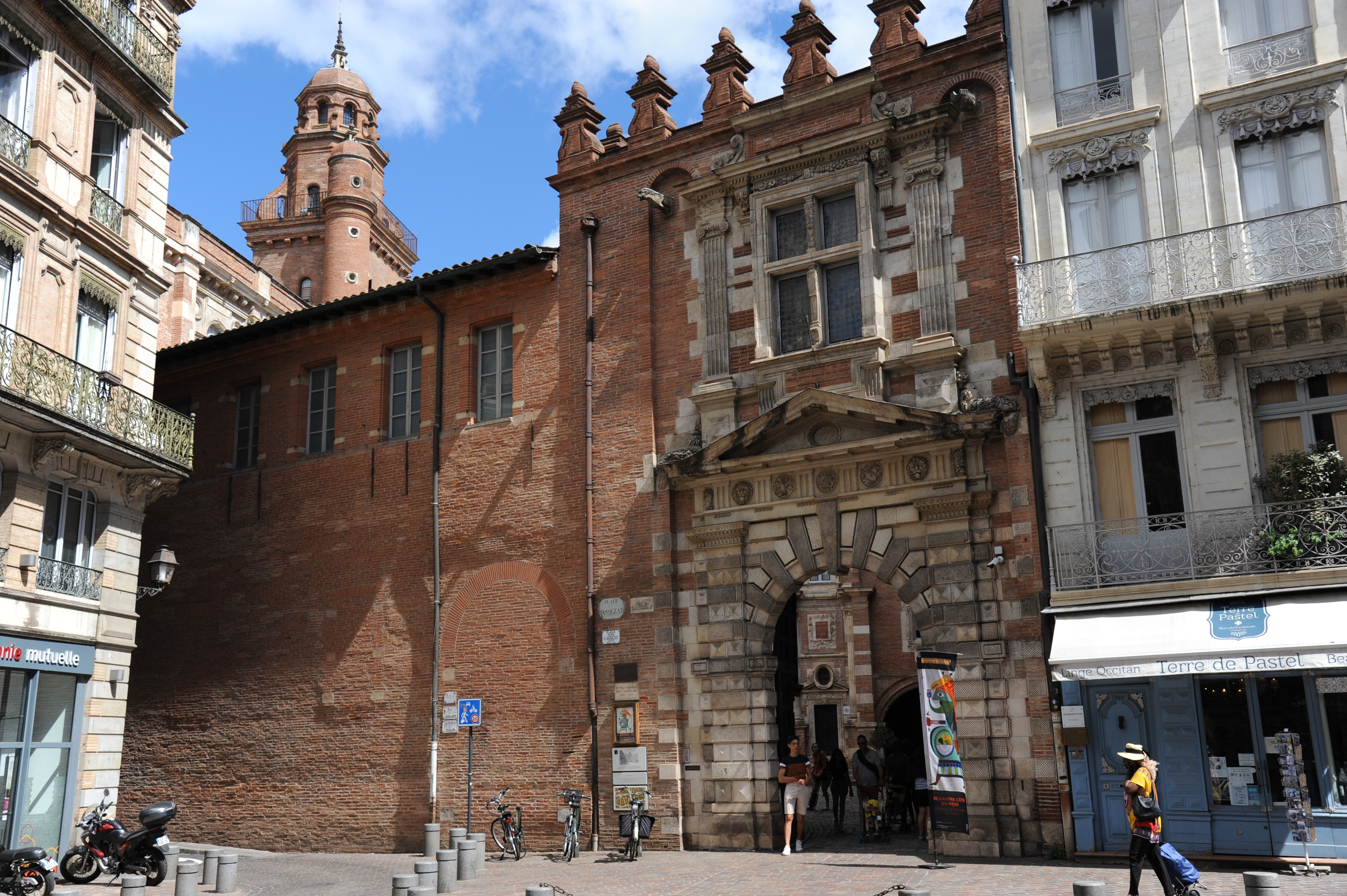
Assézat: street façade.

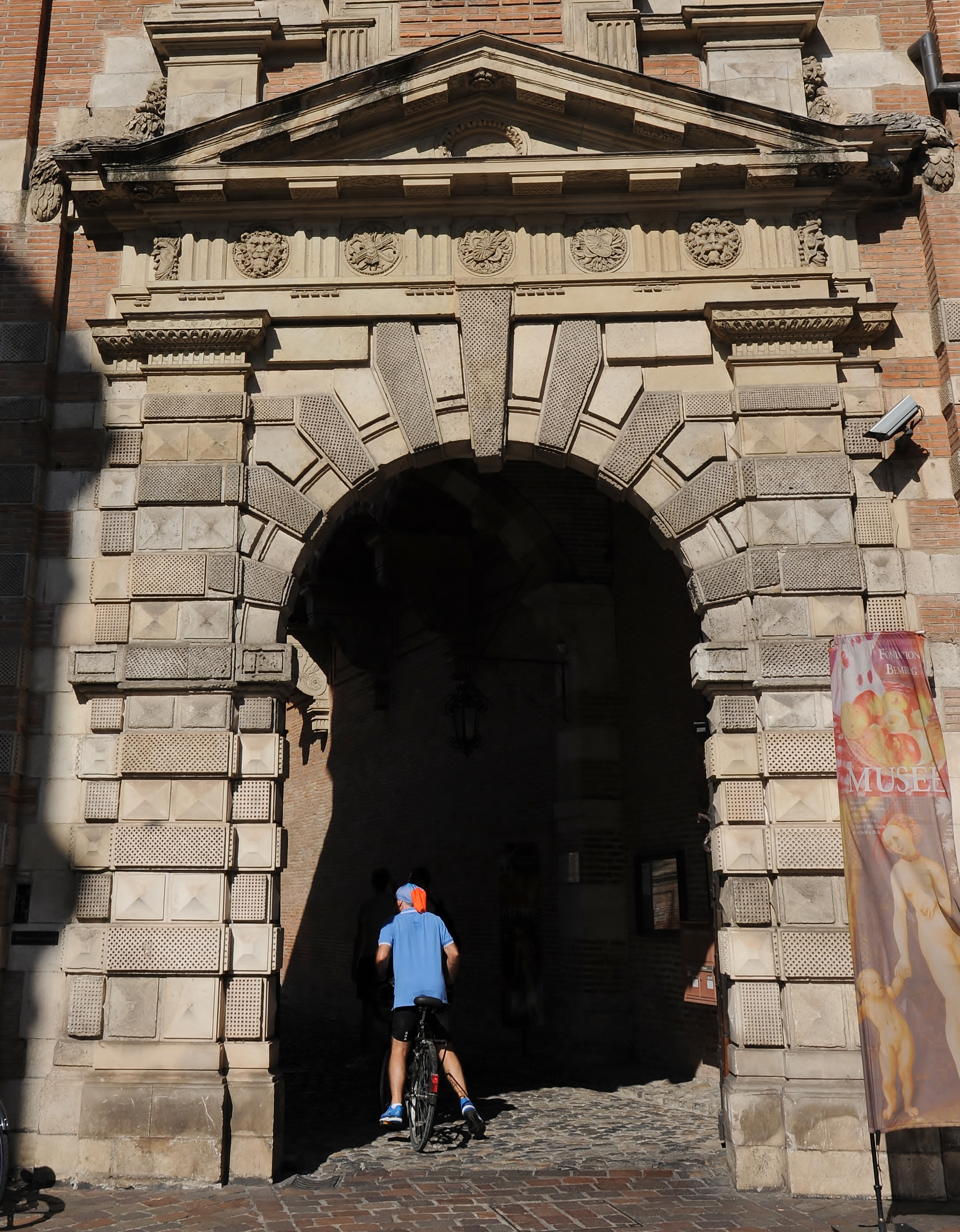
Assézat: entrance portal.

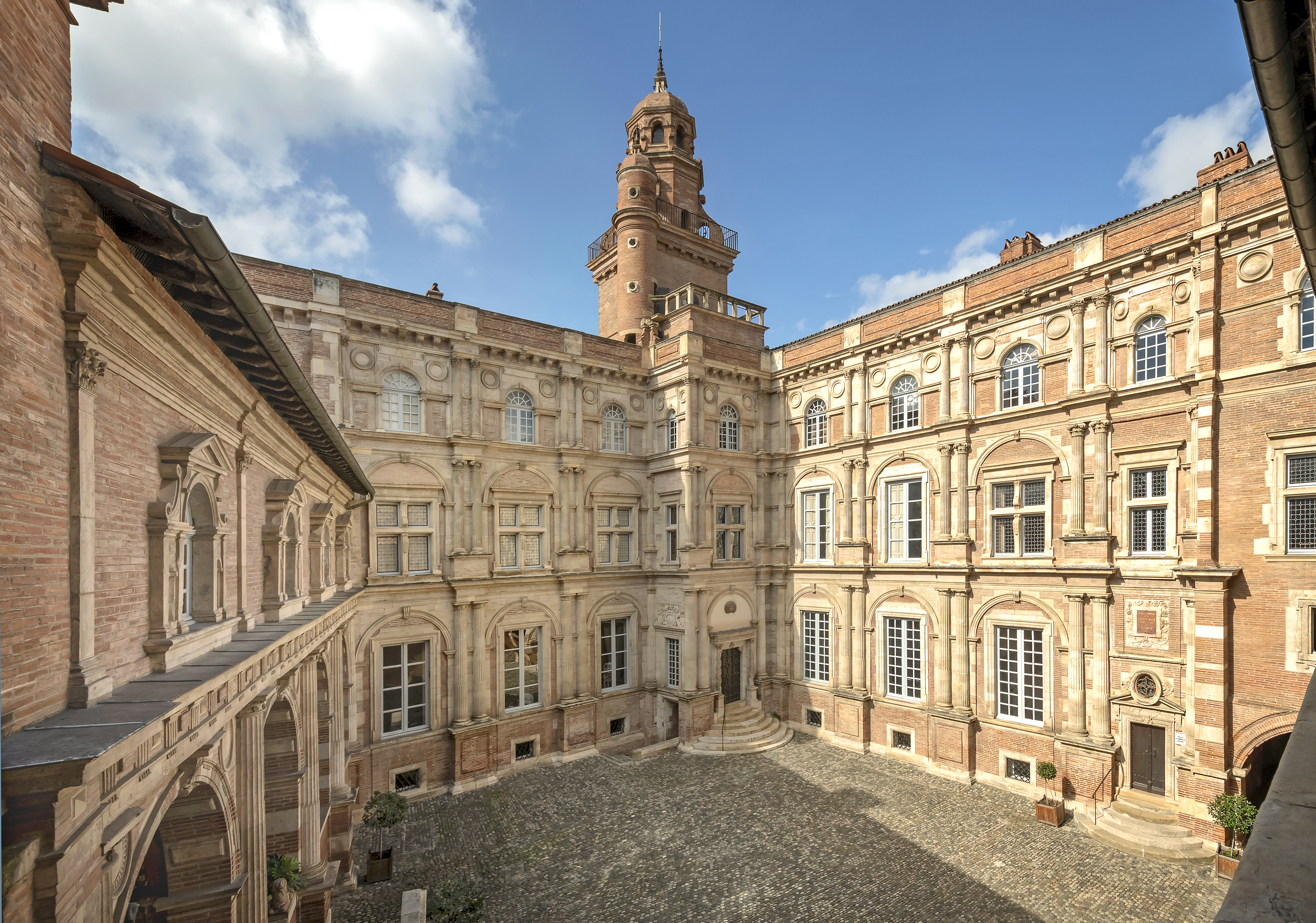
Assézat: honor court.

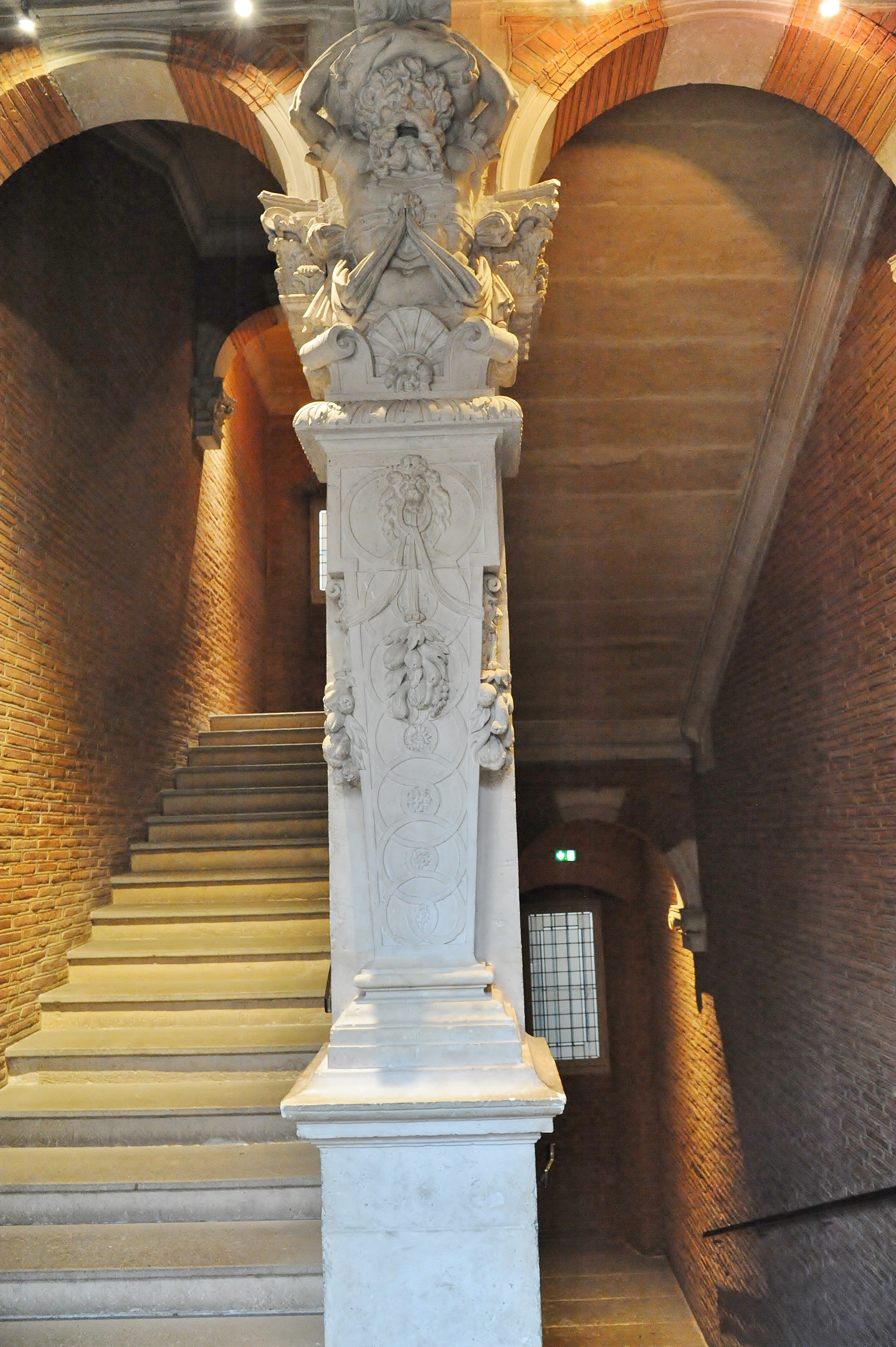
Assézat: grand stair.

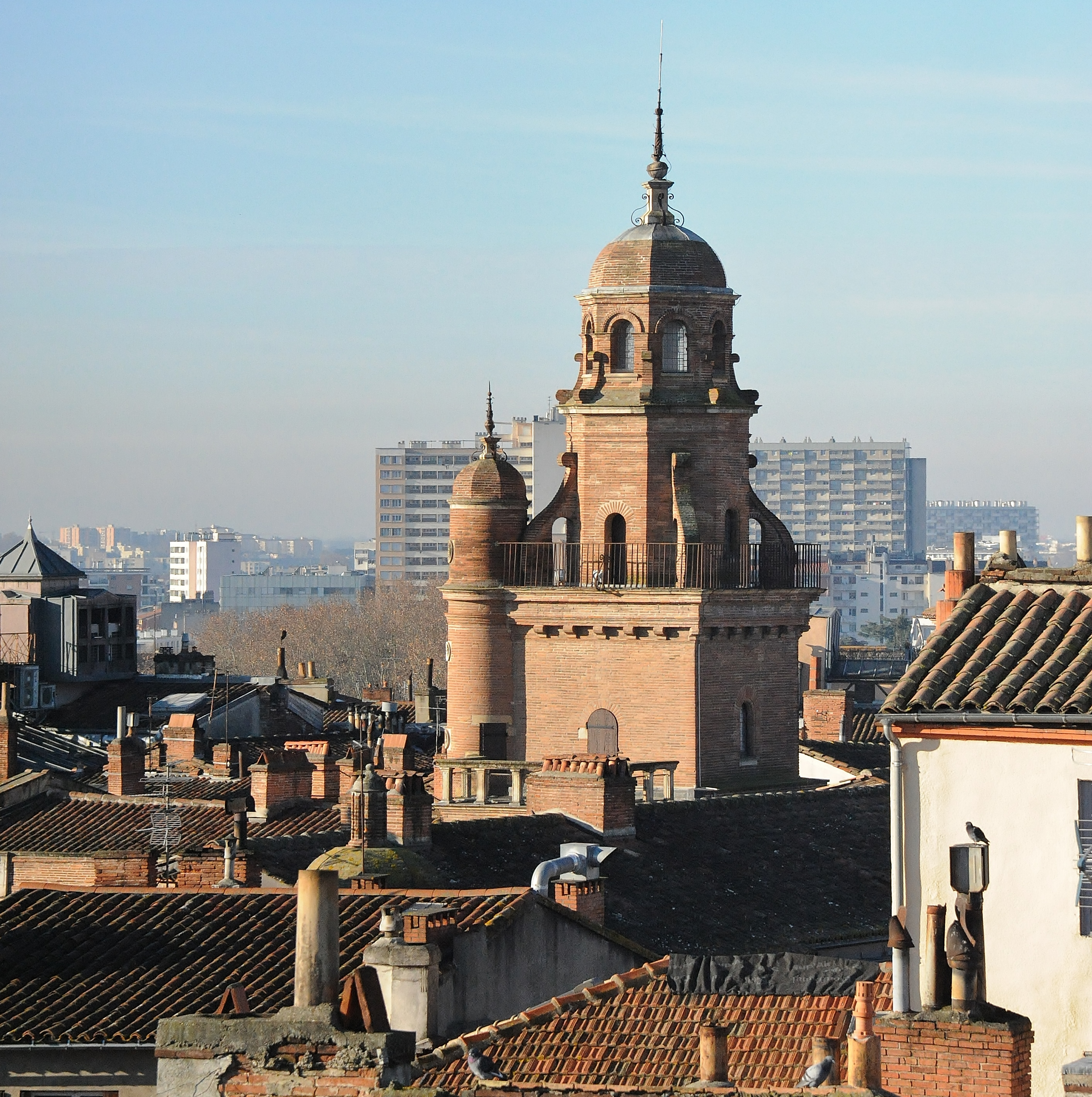
Assézat: top of the tower.

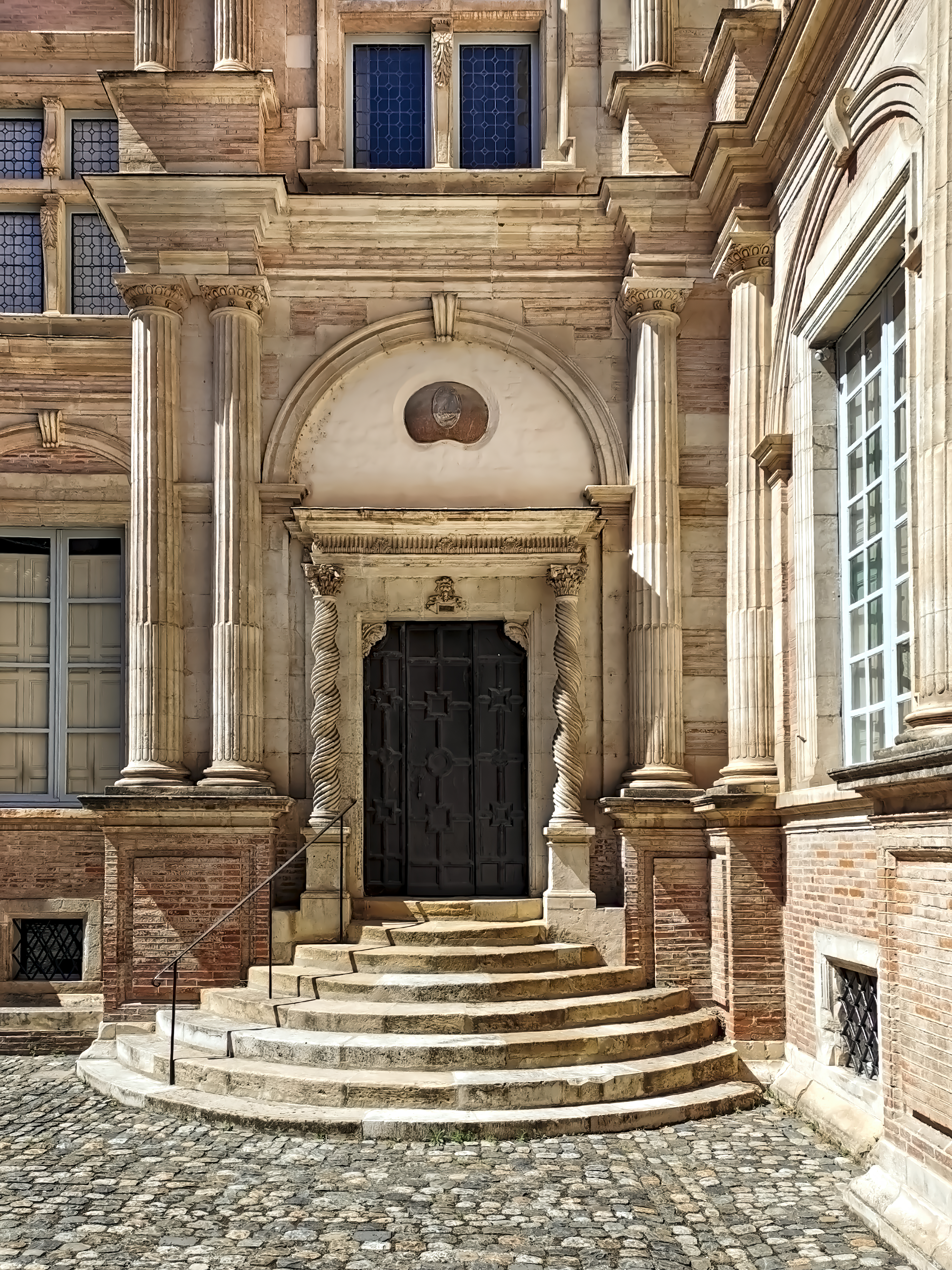
Door opening to the stair.

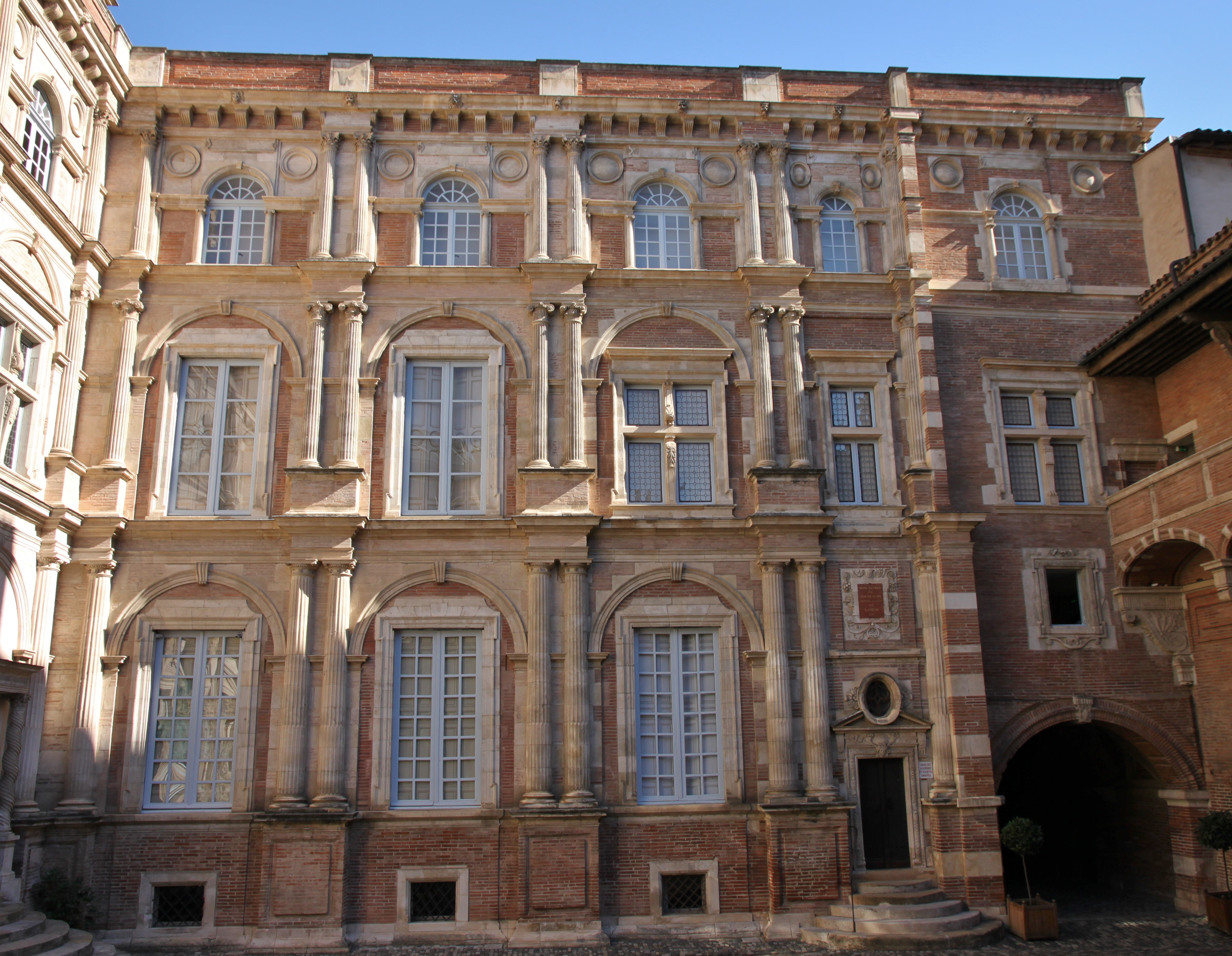
Assézat: classical façade.

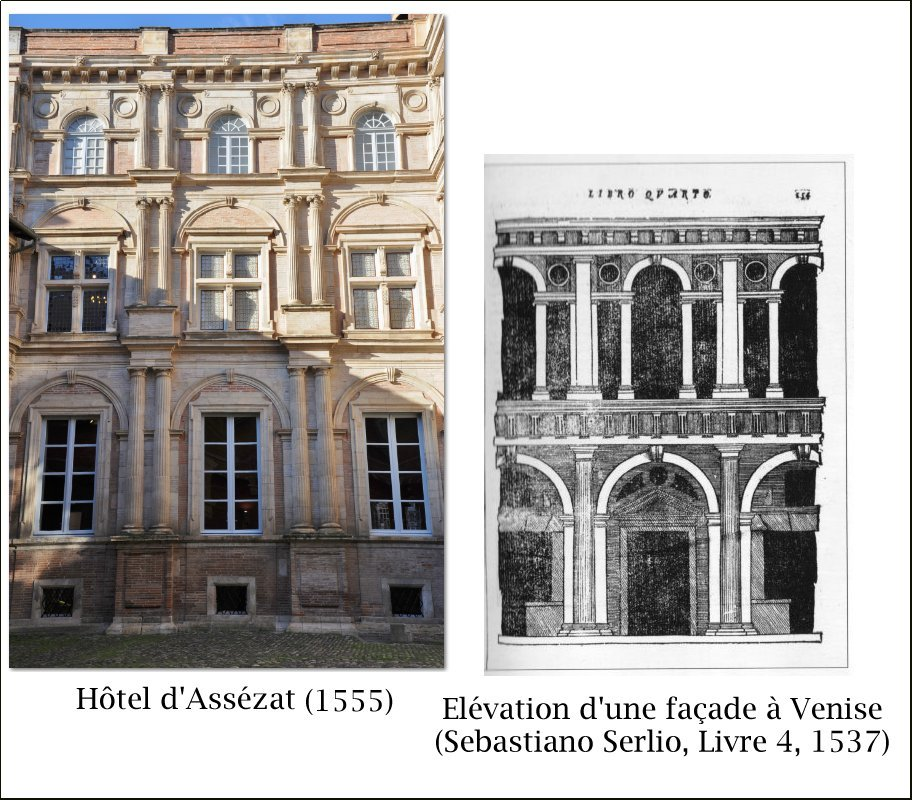
Assézat: montage showing Serlio’s influence.

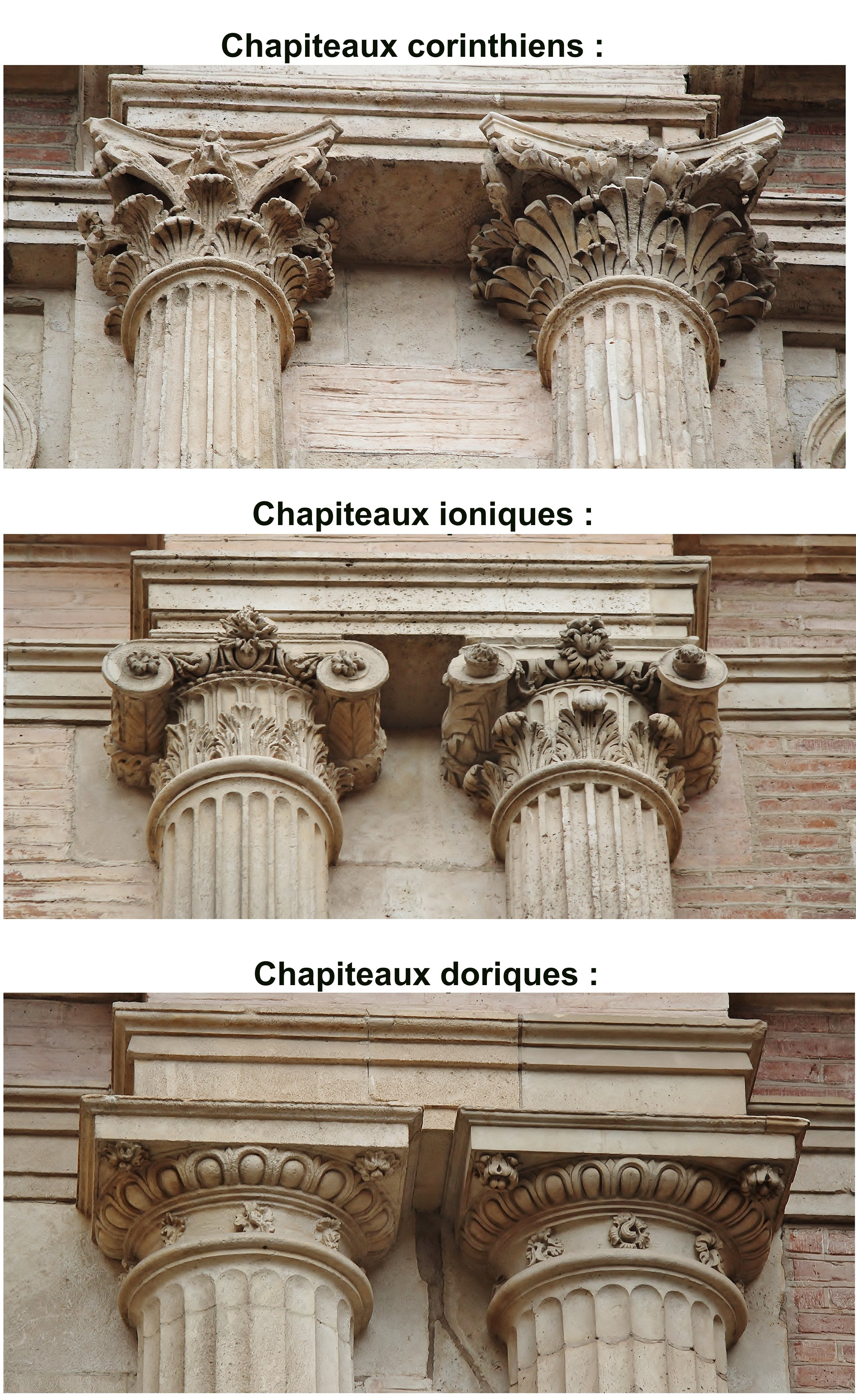
Capitals.

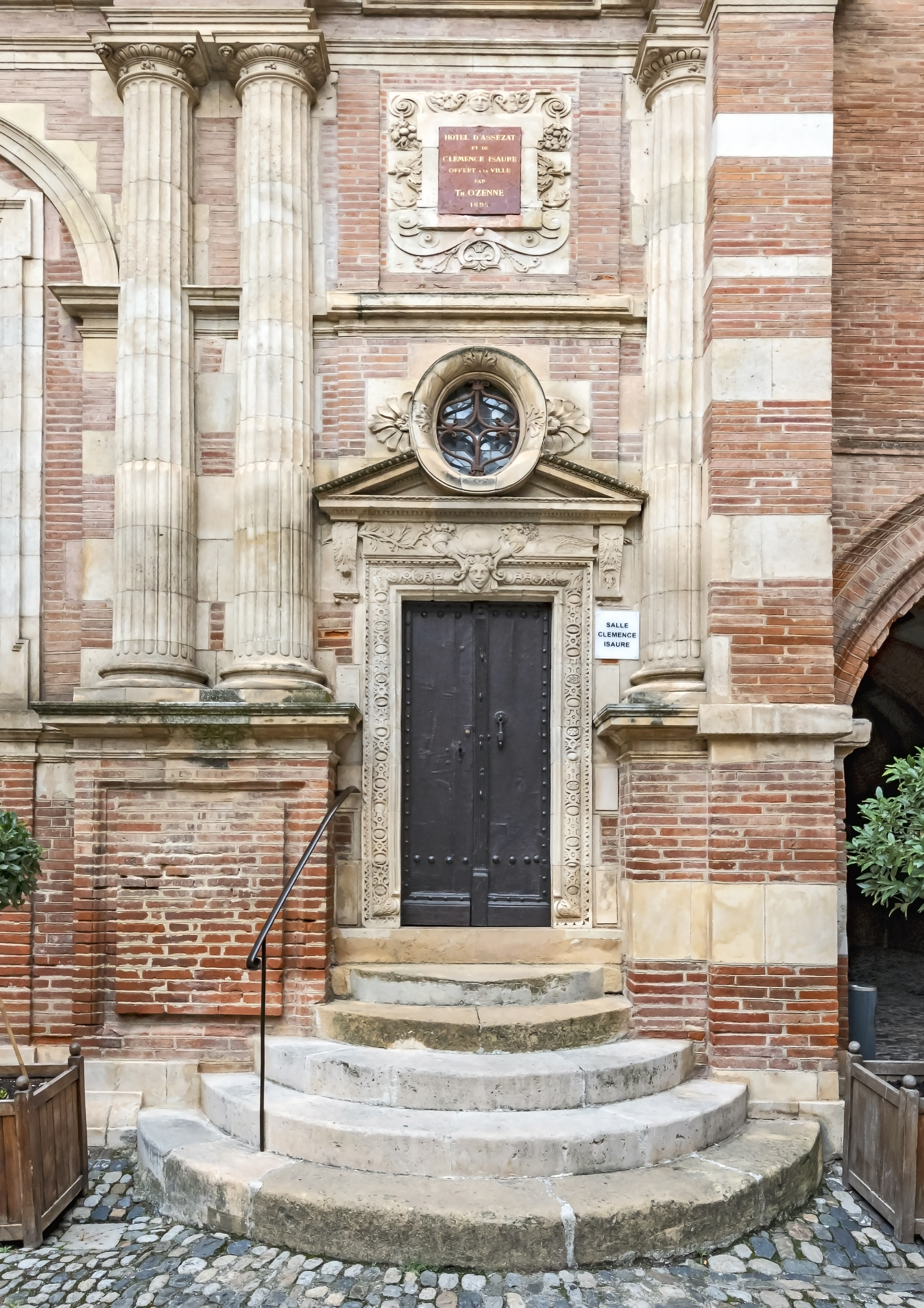
Assézat: merchant’s office door.

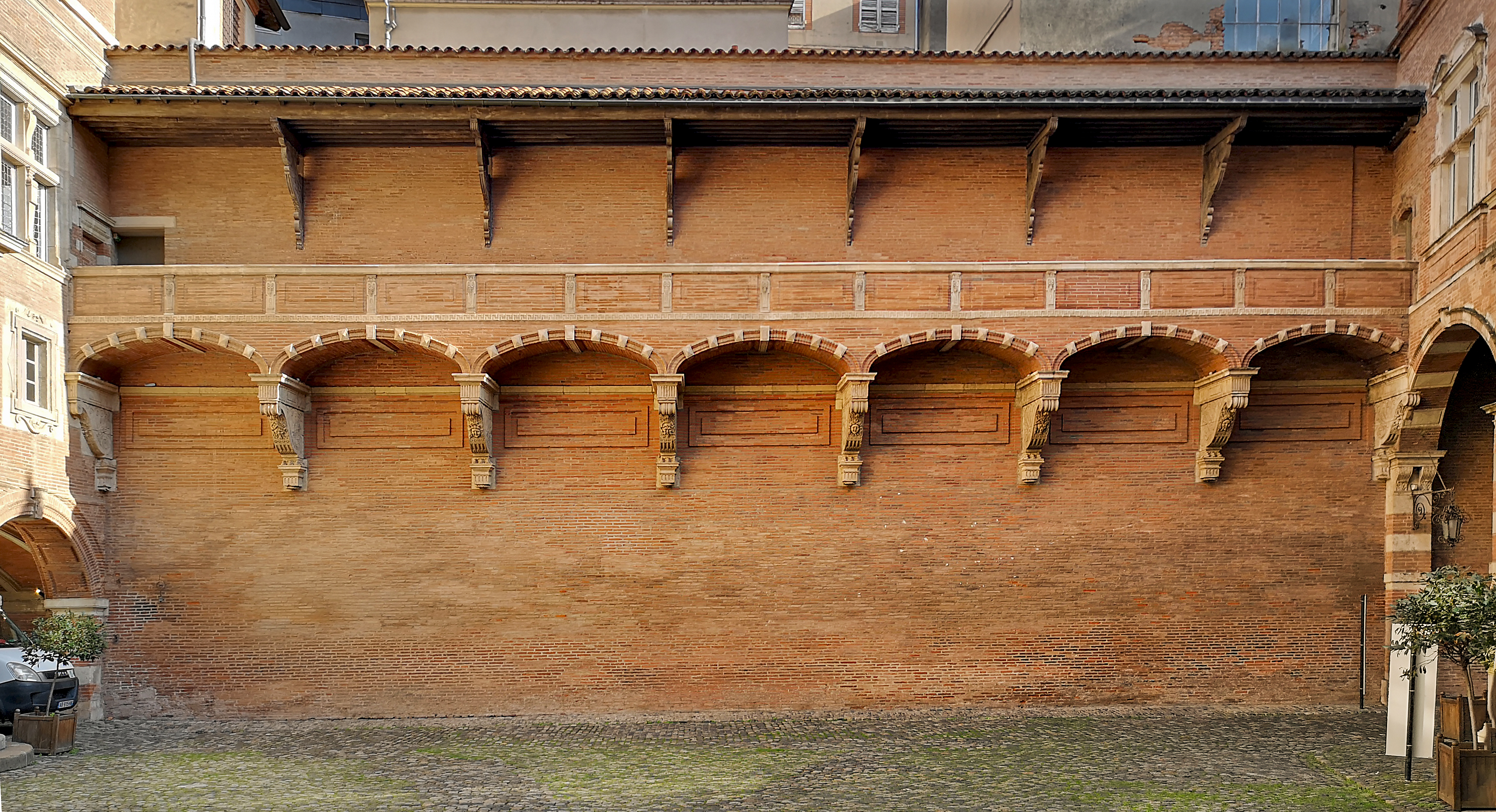
Assézat: courtyard gallery.

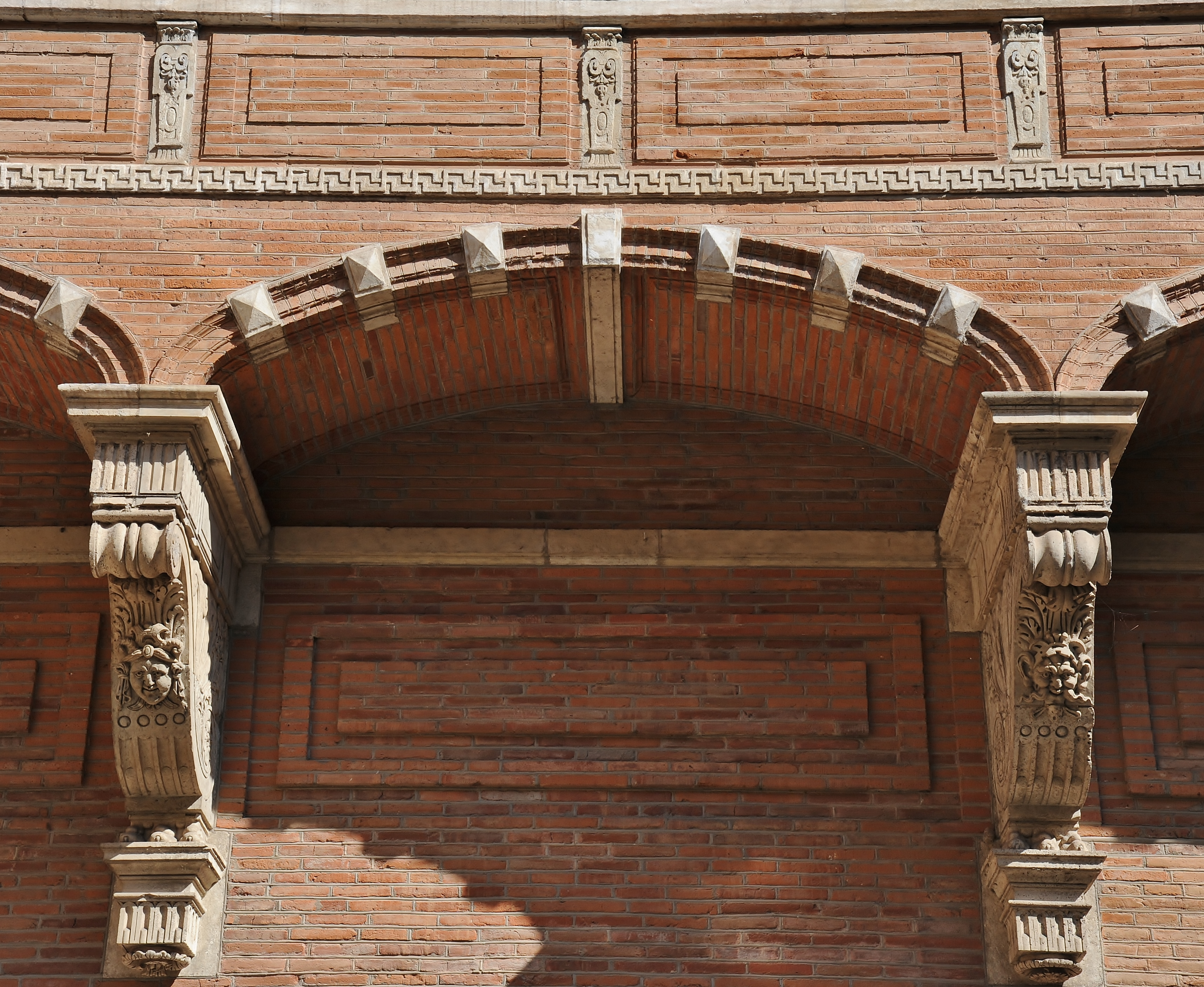
Assézat: gallery arch.

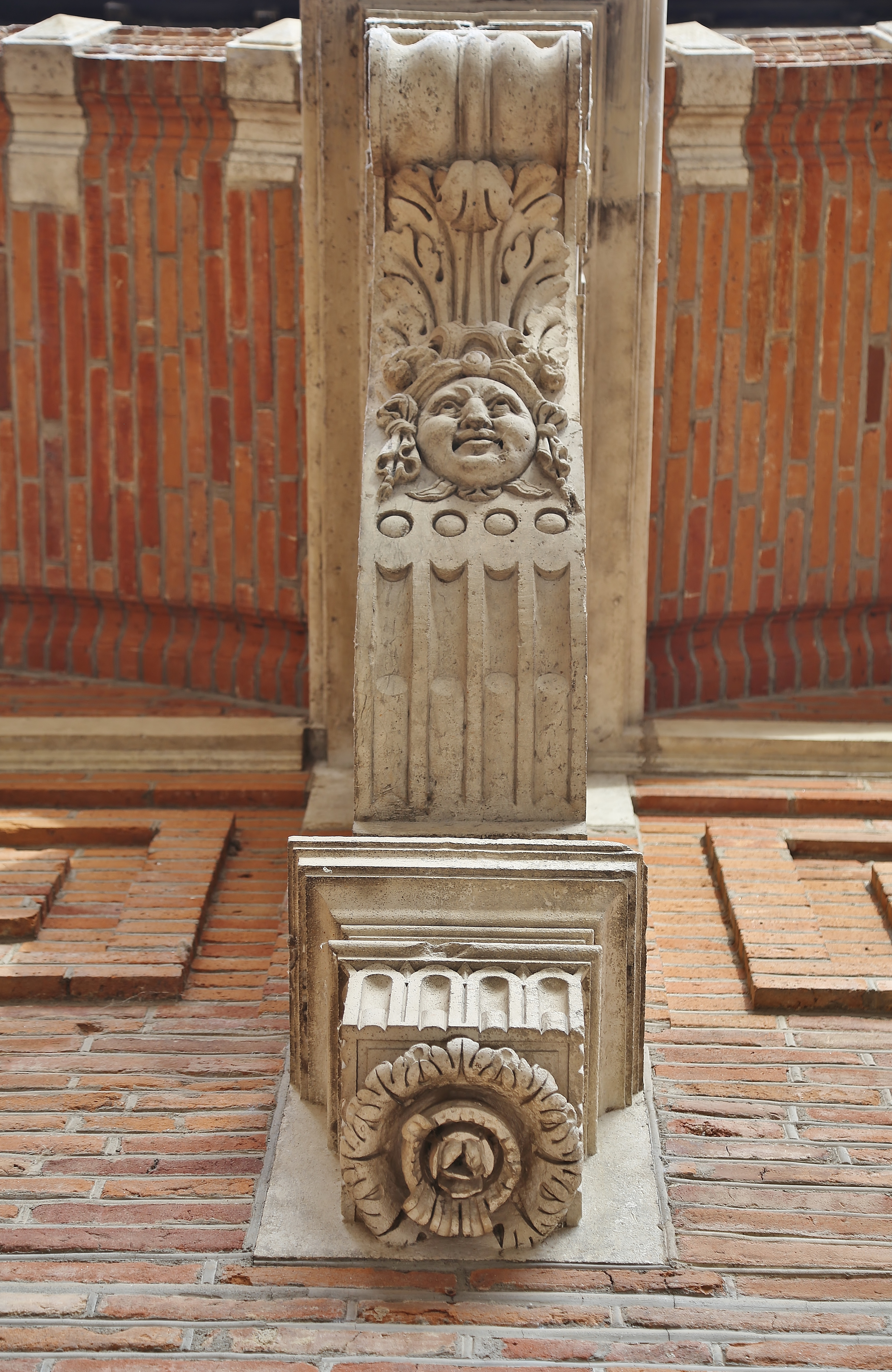
Gallery console.

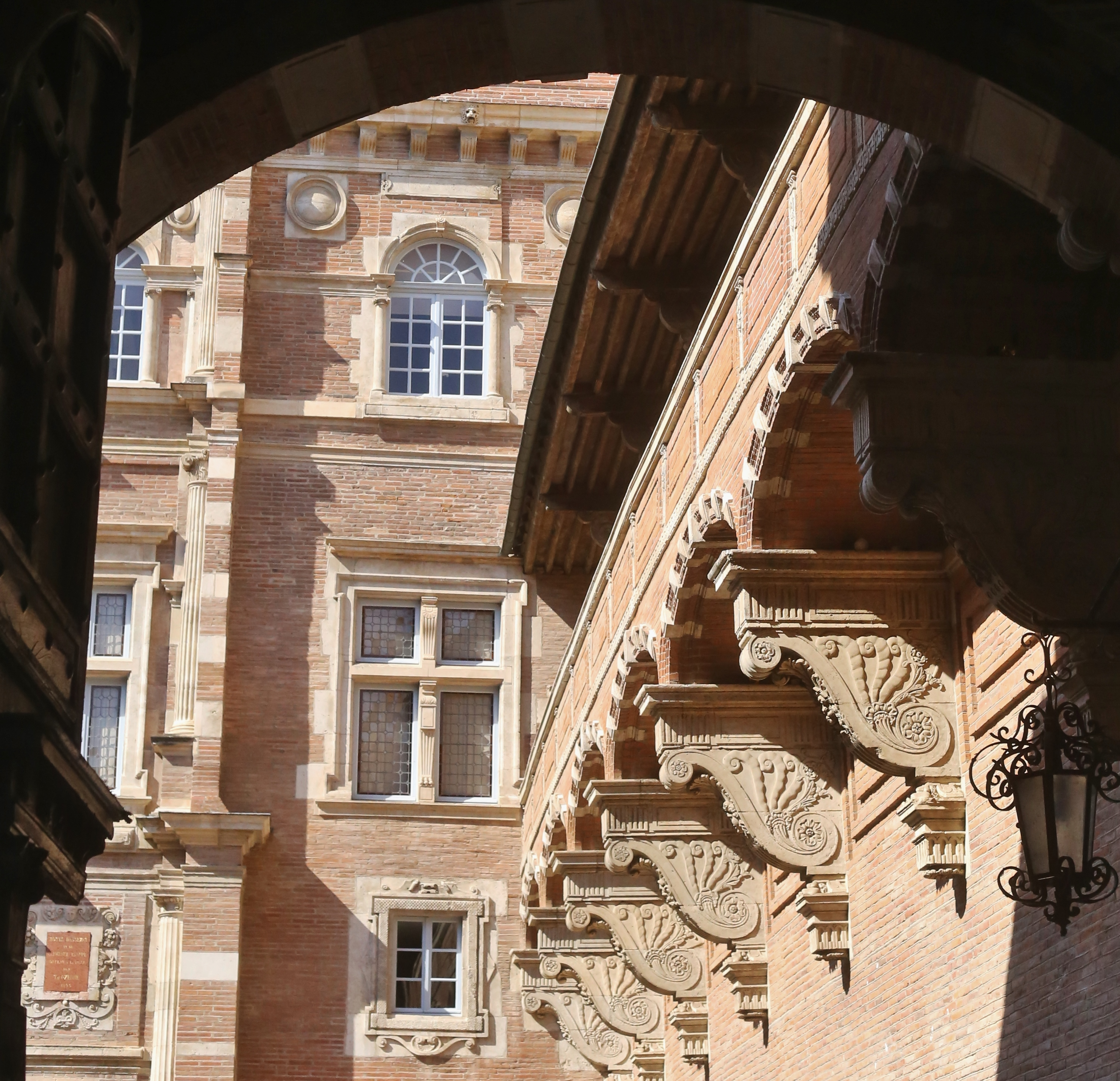
Assézat: gallery with decorated consoles.

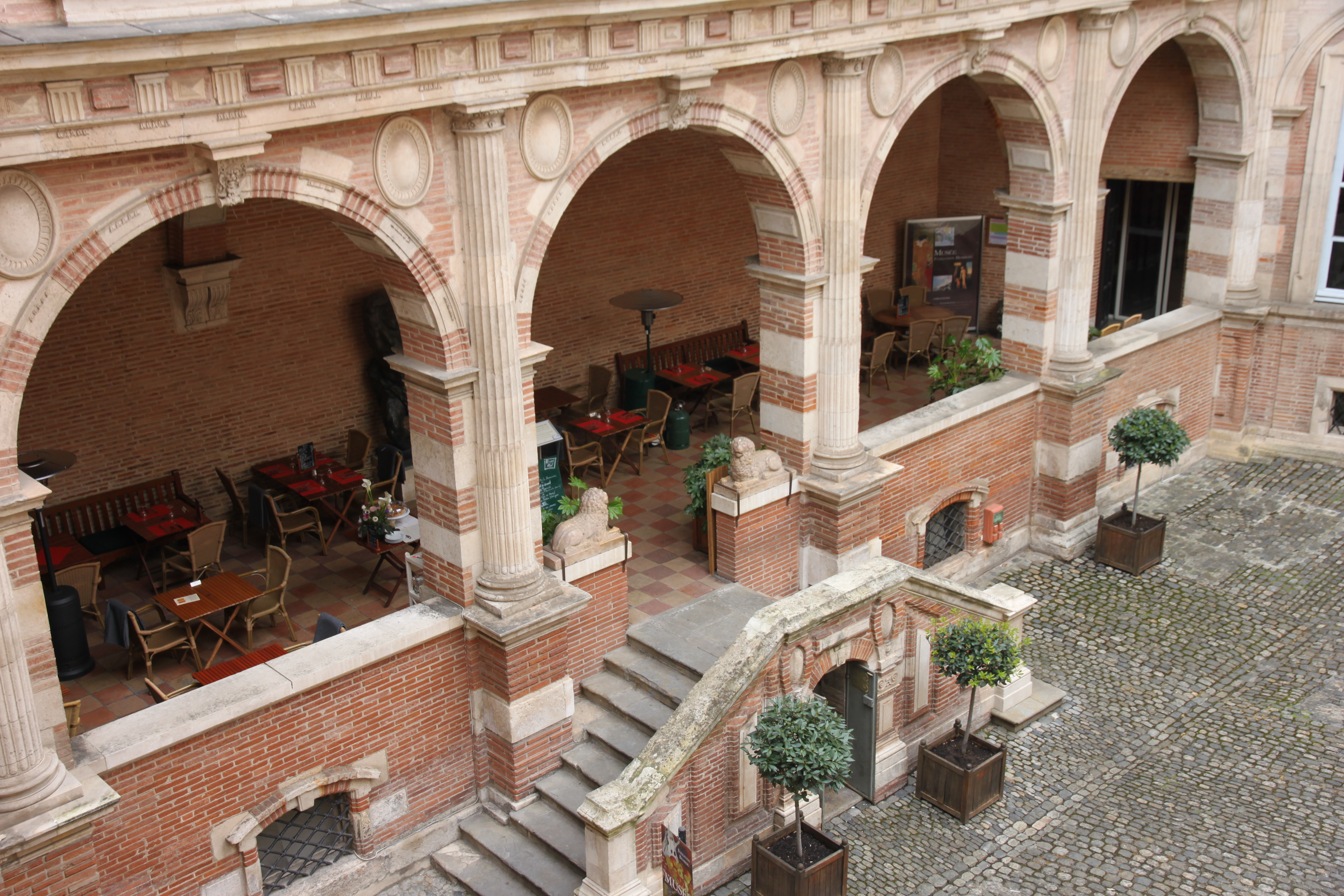
Assézat: loggia.

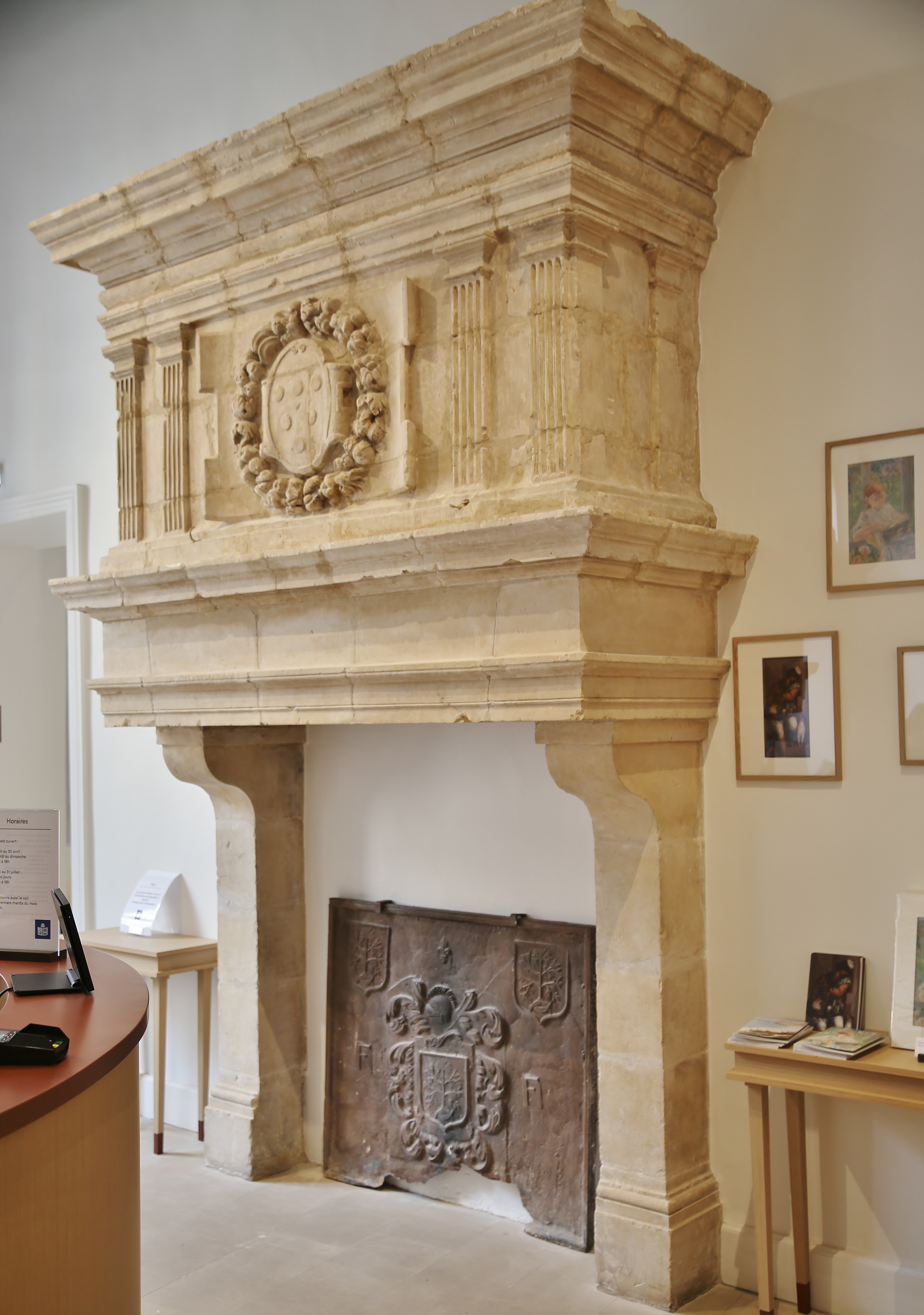
Assézat: fireplace.

==== Hôtel d’Astorg et de Saint-Germain ====
Address: 16 rue des Changes.

After Jean Delcros in the 1530s (street façade), merchant Jean Astorg continued building in 1568 on one of the main axes of Renaissance Toulouse. A side entrance leads to the honor court, while ground-floor street bays housed shops. In the court, Renaissance windows imitate those of neighbor Pierre Delpech, a powerful capitoul. Probably built in the early 17th century, two external timber stairs and their wooden galleries serve the court-side wings—rare survivals of a once-common Renaissance timber architecture.

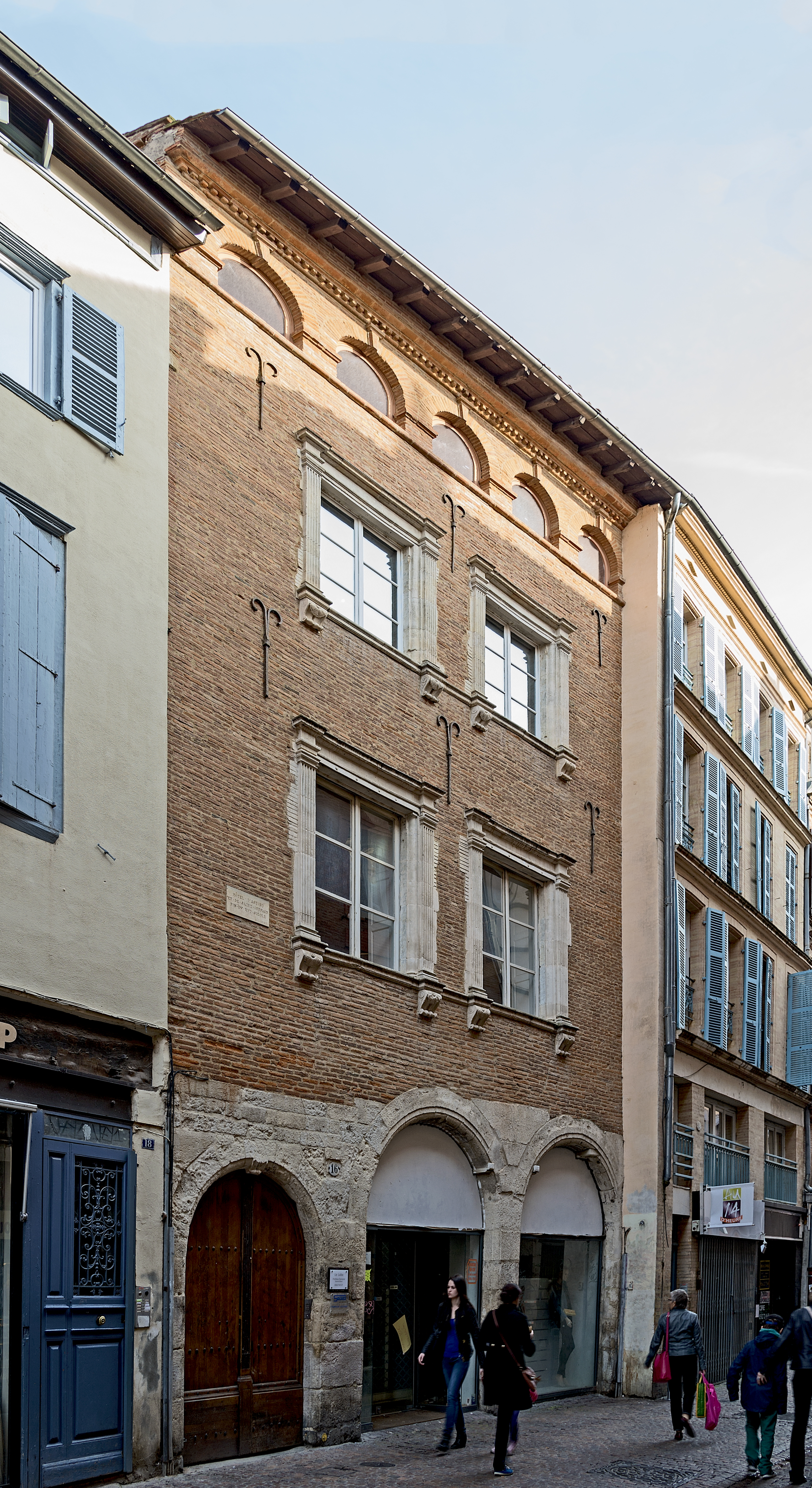
Hôtel d’Astorg.

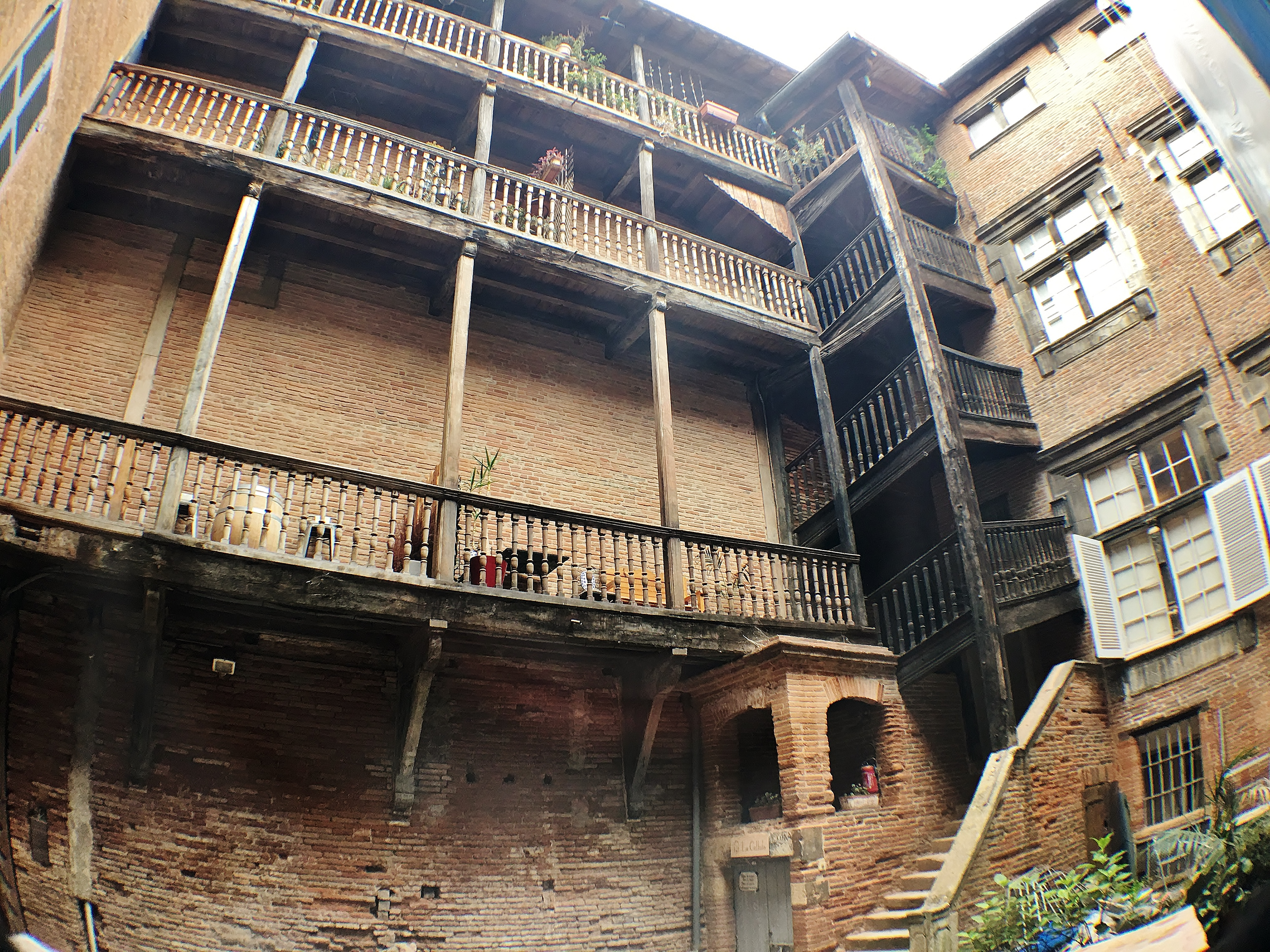
Astorg: court.

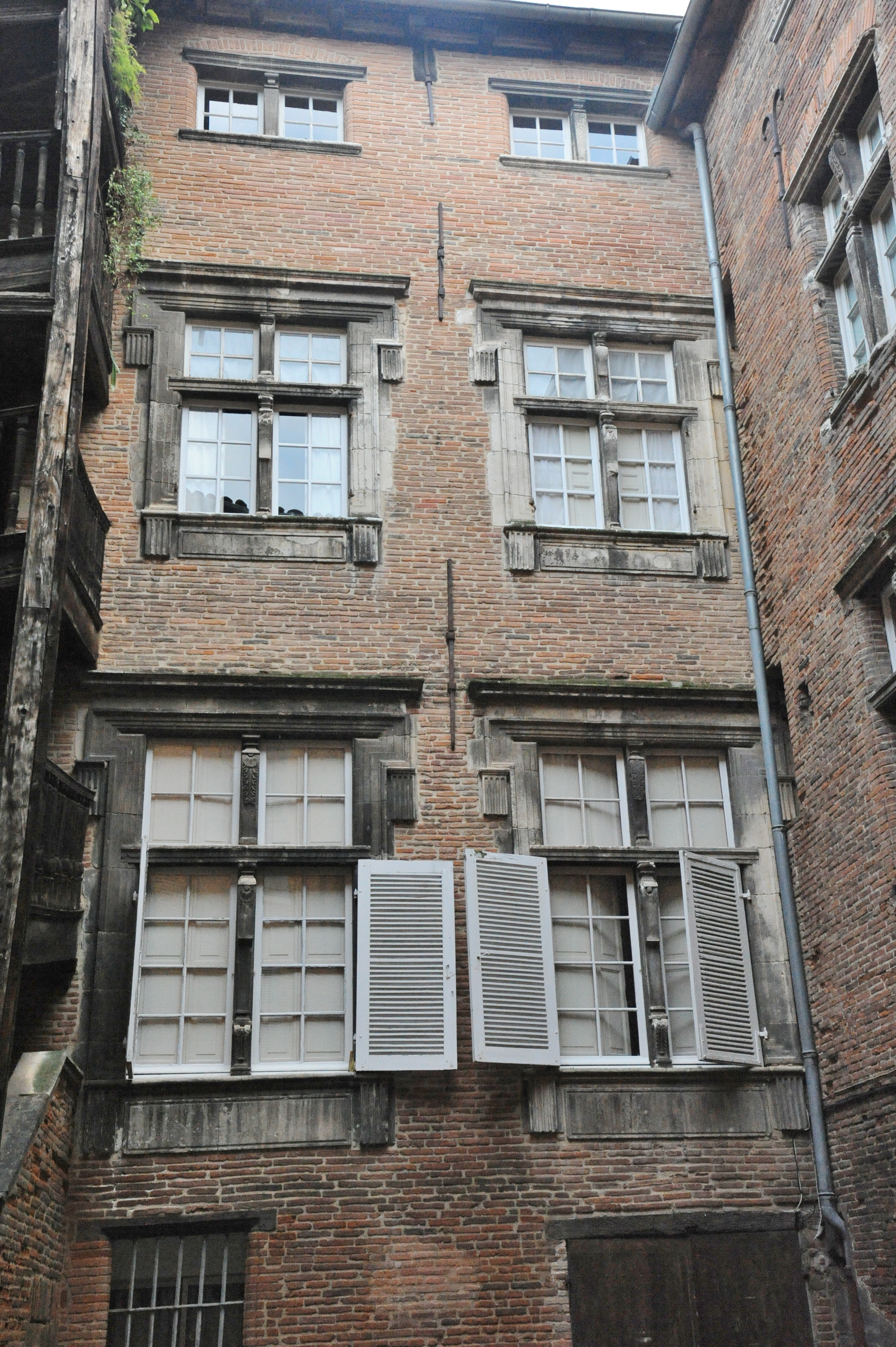
Astorg: Renaissance windows in the court.

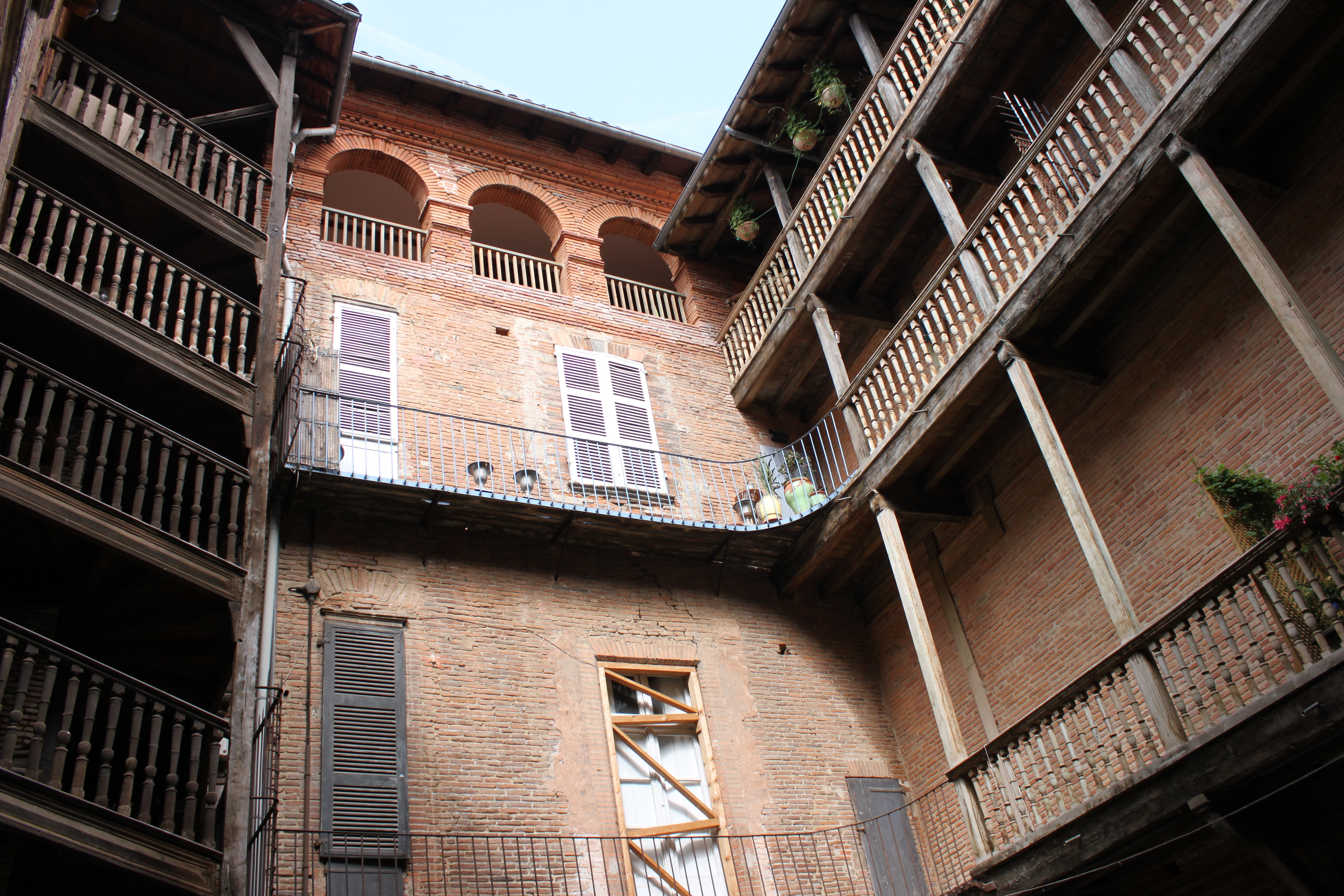
Astorg: timber galleries in the court.

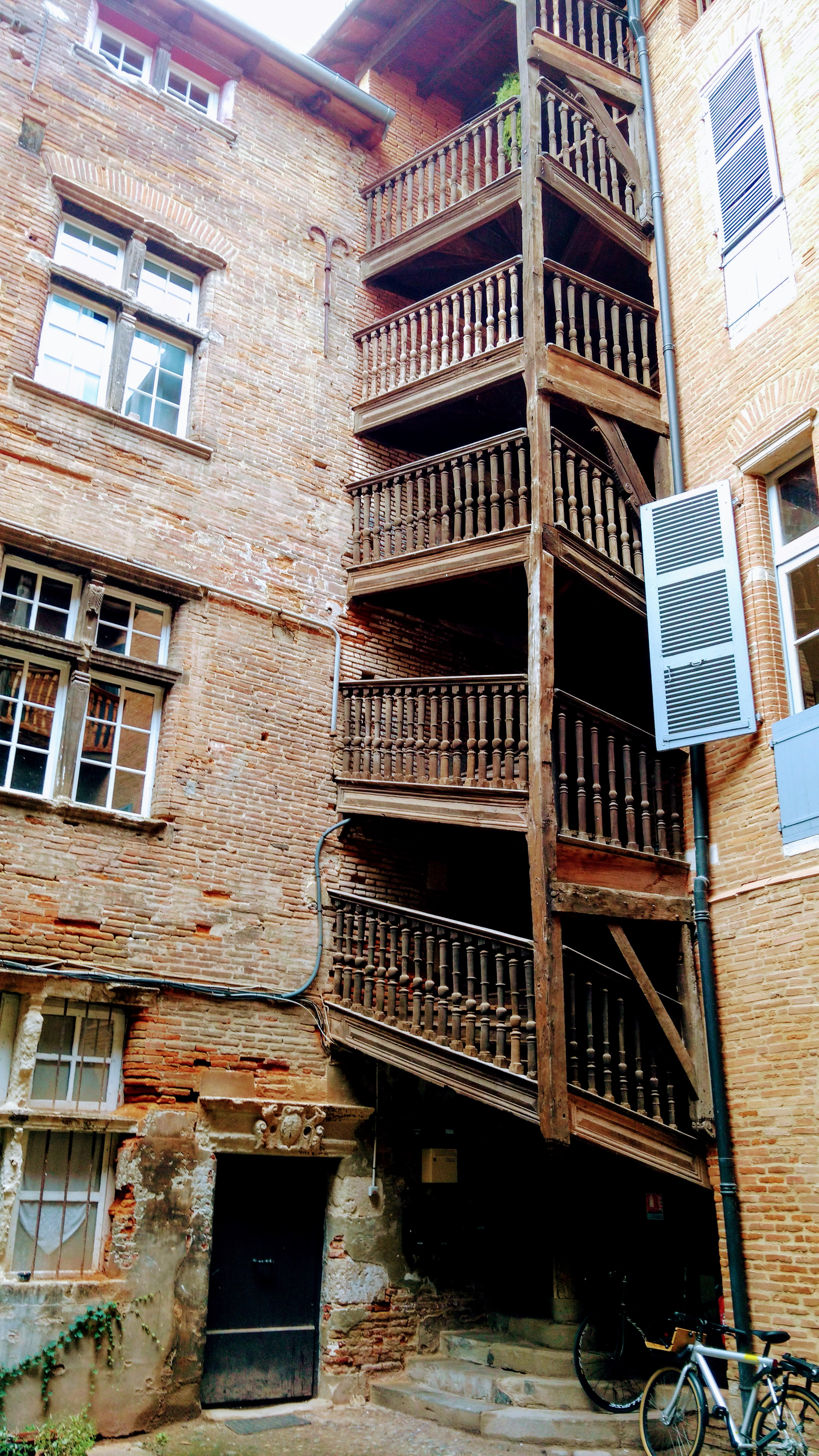
Astorg: suspended stair.

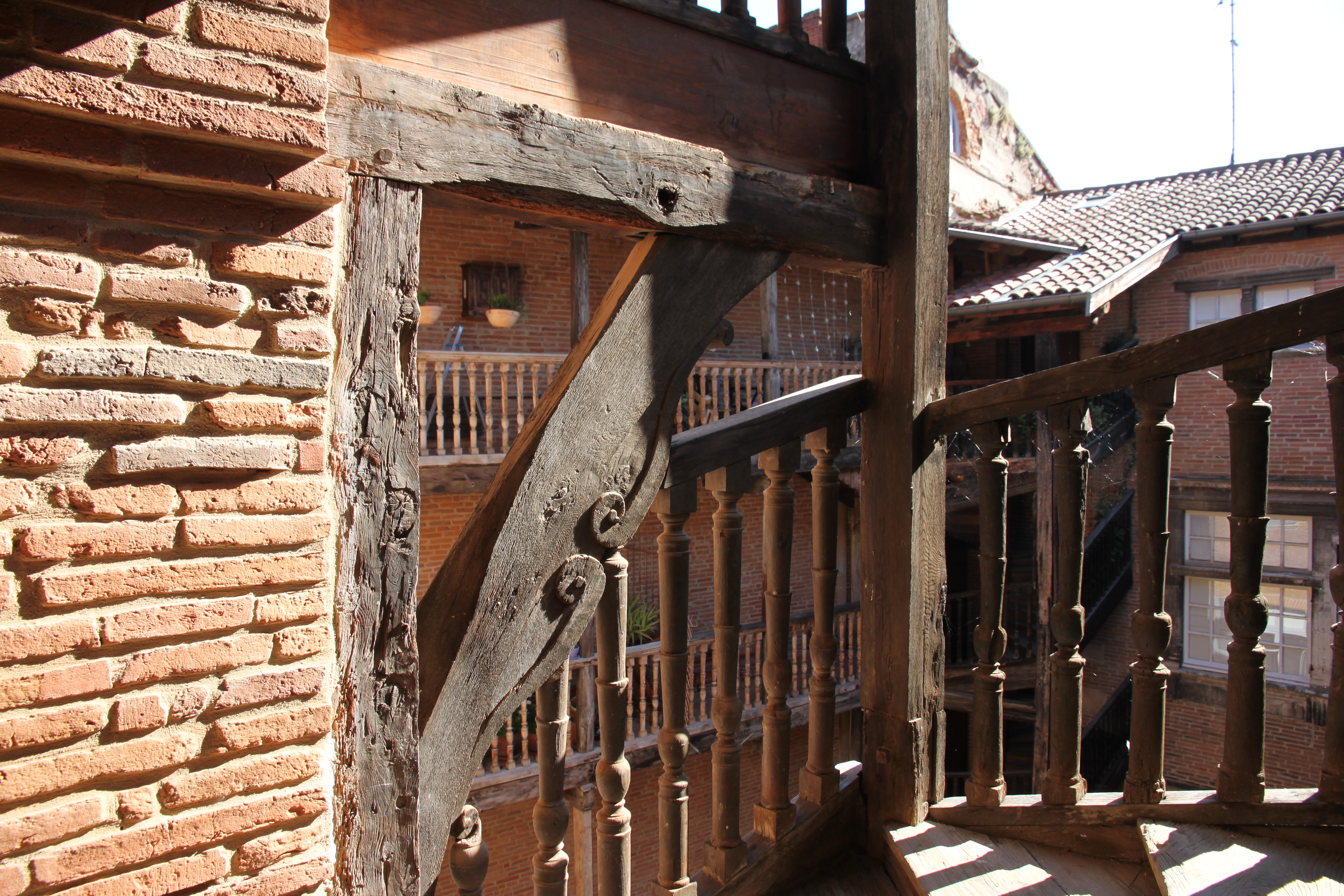
Astorg: molded balusters, opposed volutes.

==== Hôtel de Bagis, later de Clary (also Hôtel de pierre) ====
Address: 25 rue de la Dalbade.

In 1538, architect Nicolas Bachelier and mason Antoine Lescalle, assisted in design by Jean Albert, prior of La Réole, were commissioned by parlementary counselor Jean de Bagis. Classical ideals dictated the symmetrical façades and regular square court. Stone bays present a Doric order increasingly complete by level, whose novelty impressed Toulouse, all the more as Jean de Bagis, a member of the King’s Grand Council, ranked among the city’s most important figures.

At the core of the lodging is a straight-flight stair among the first in Toulouse after that at the Hôtel d’Ulmo. A portal with splendid Atlases marks its entrance. Long attributed to Nicolas Bachelier for their expressiveness and execution quality, their dating is debated and remains under study.

In the early 17th century, François de Clary, First President of the Parlement, and his wife acquired the Hôtel de Bagis. Architect Pierre II Souffron, with sculptors Pierre Bouc, Pierre Monge and Thomas Heurtematte, erected a unique stone façade in Toulouse at the Renaissance, with eight bays and colossal pilasters in a symmetrical composition. Above the portal, Apollo, Mercury, Juno and Minerva celebrate the owners in rich sculpted décor.

This spectacular façade earned the house its nickname Hôtel de pierre and its owner the reputation of having diverted to his benefit stones intended for the Pont Neuf, which he supervised.

In the court, complementing the older composition, the rich Mannerist ornaments of the east and south façades—with marble inlays and abundant sculpture—also date from the early 17th century.

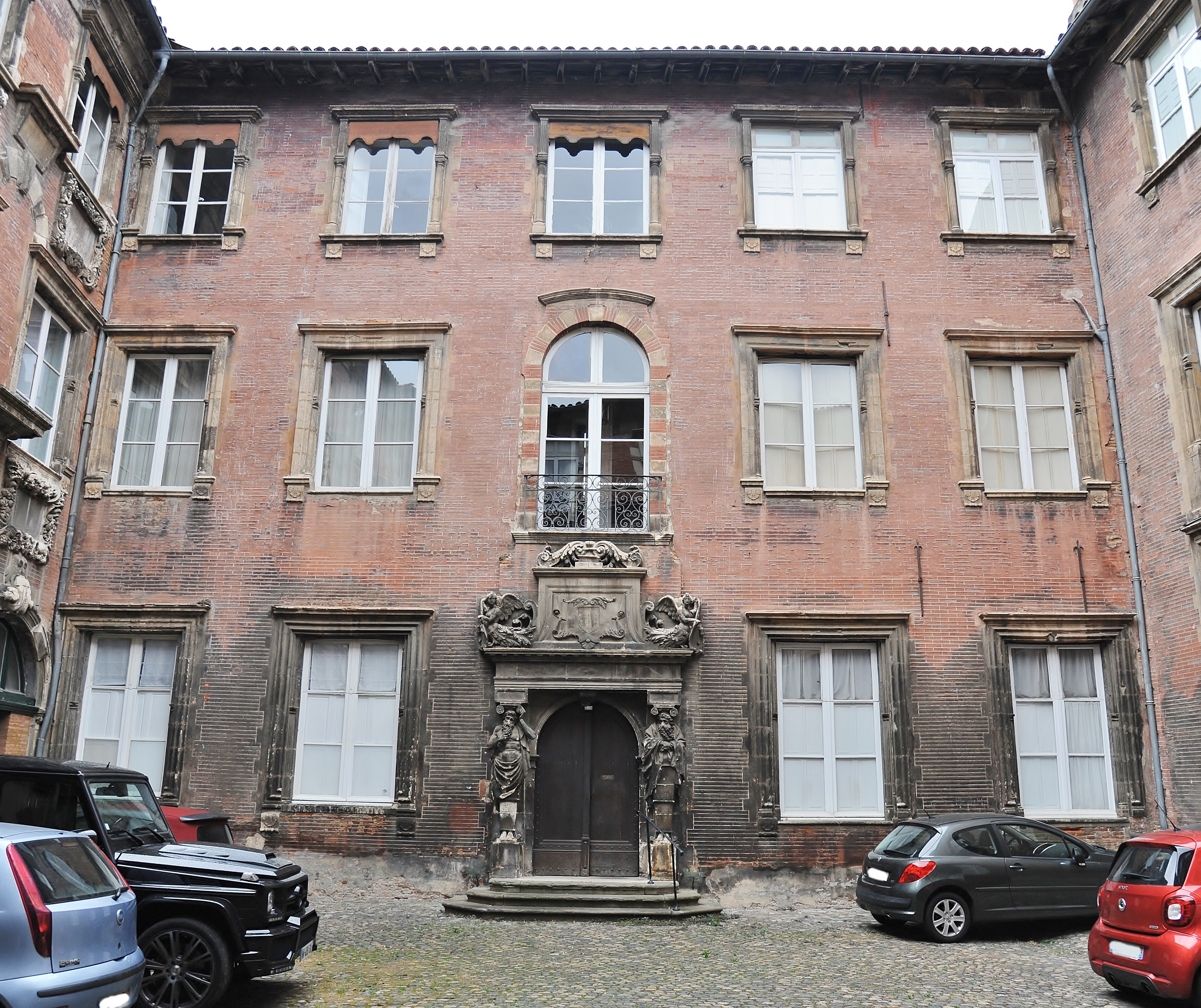
Hôtel de Bagis.

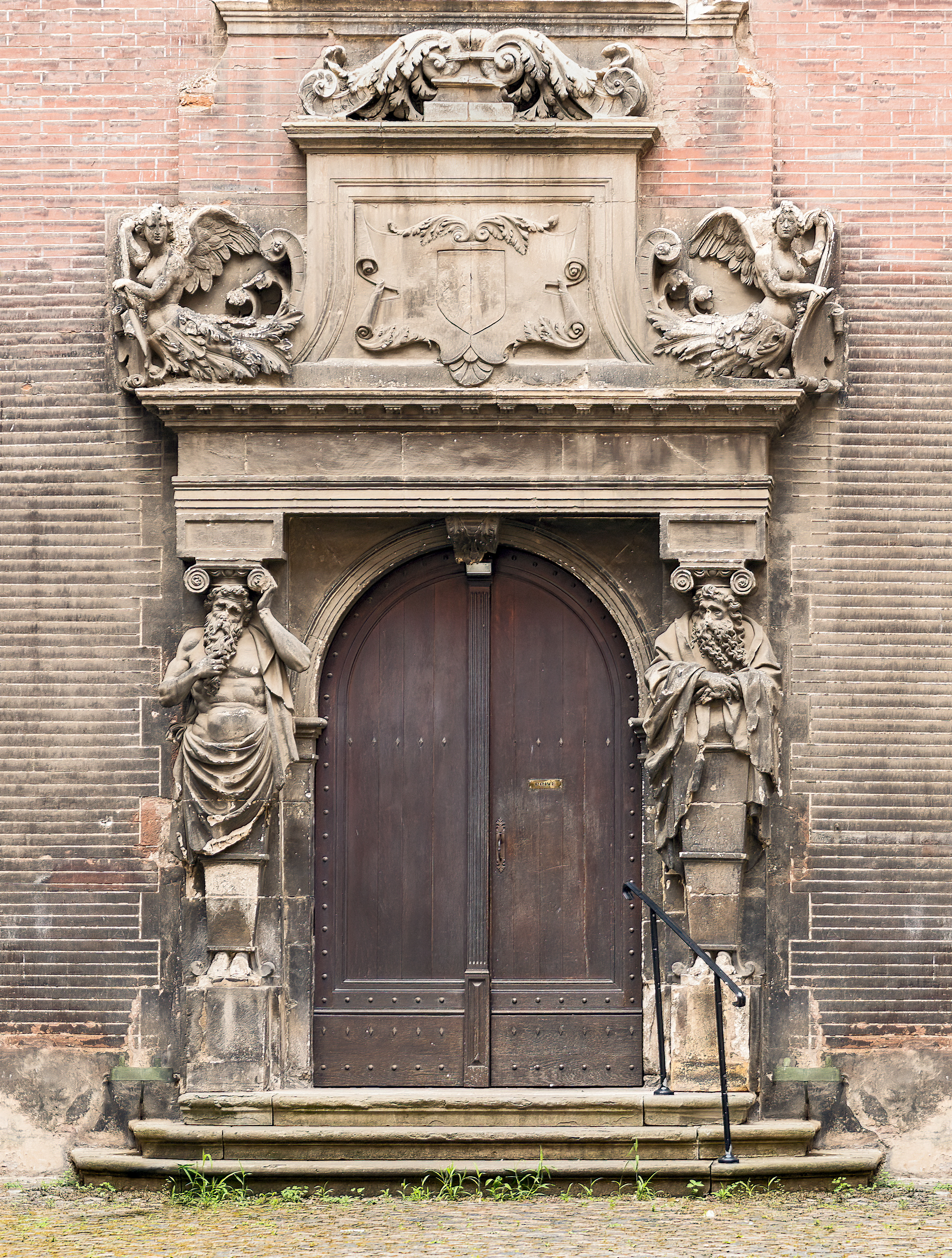
Portal with Atlases (attribution to Nicolas Bachelier debated).

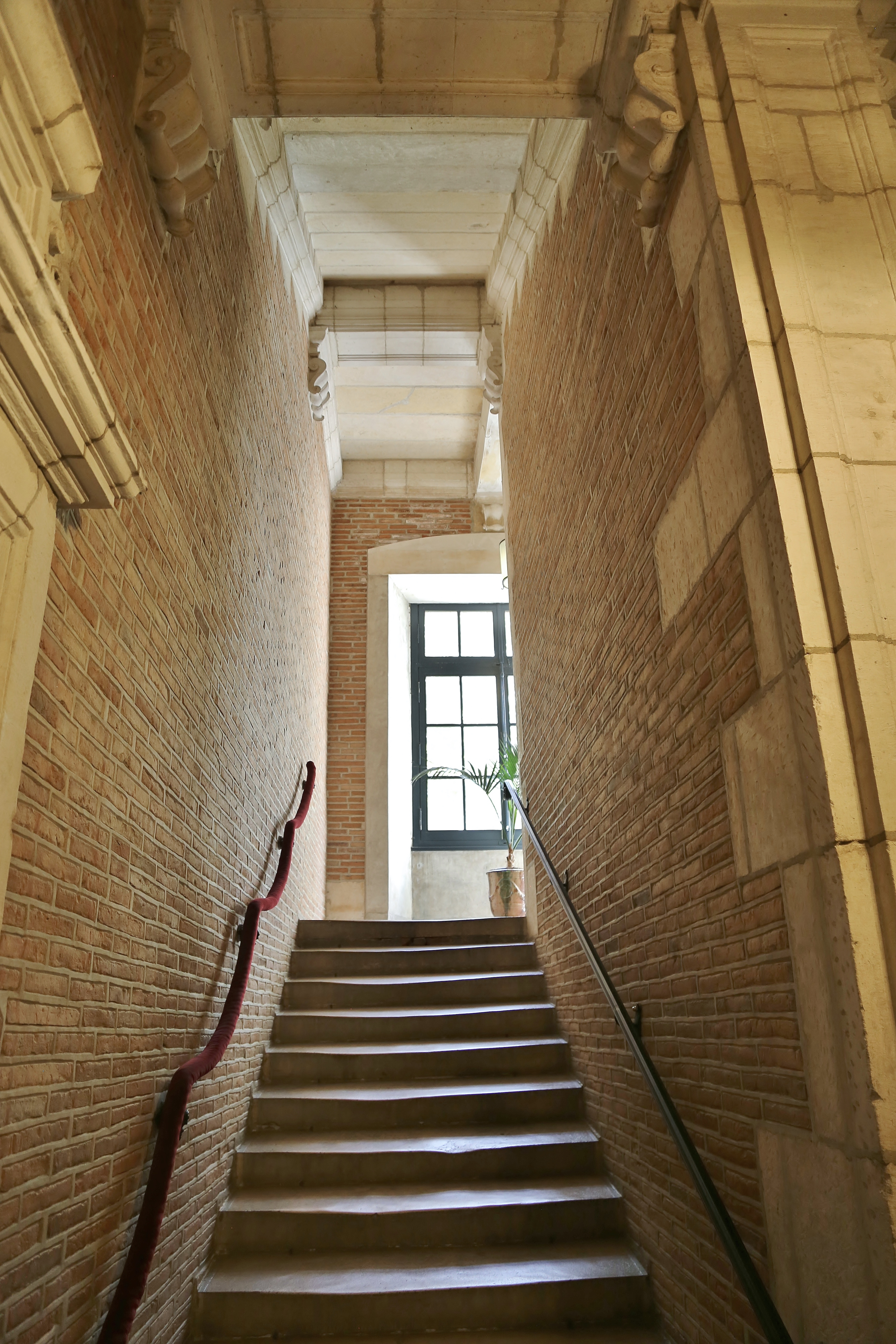
Grand straight stair.

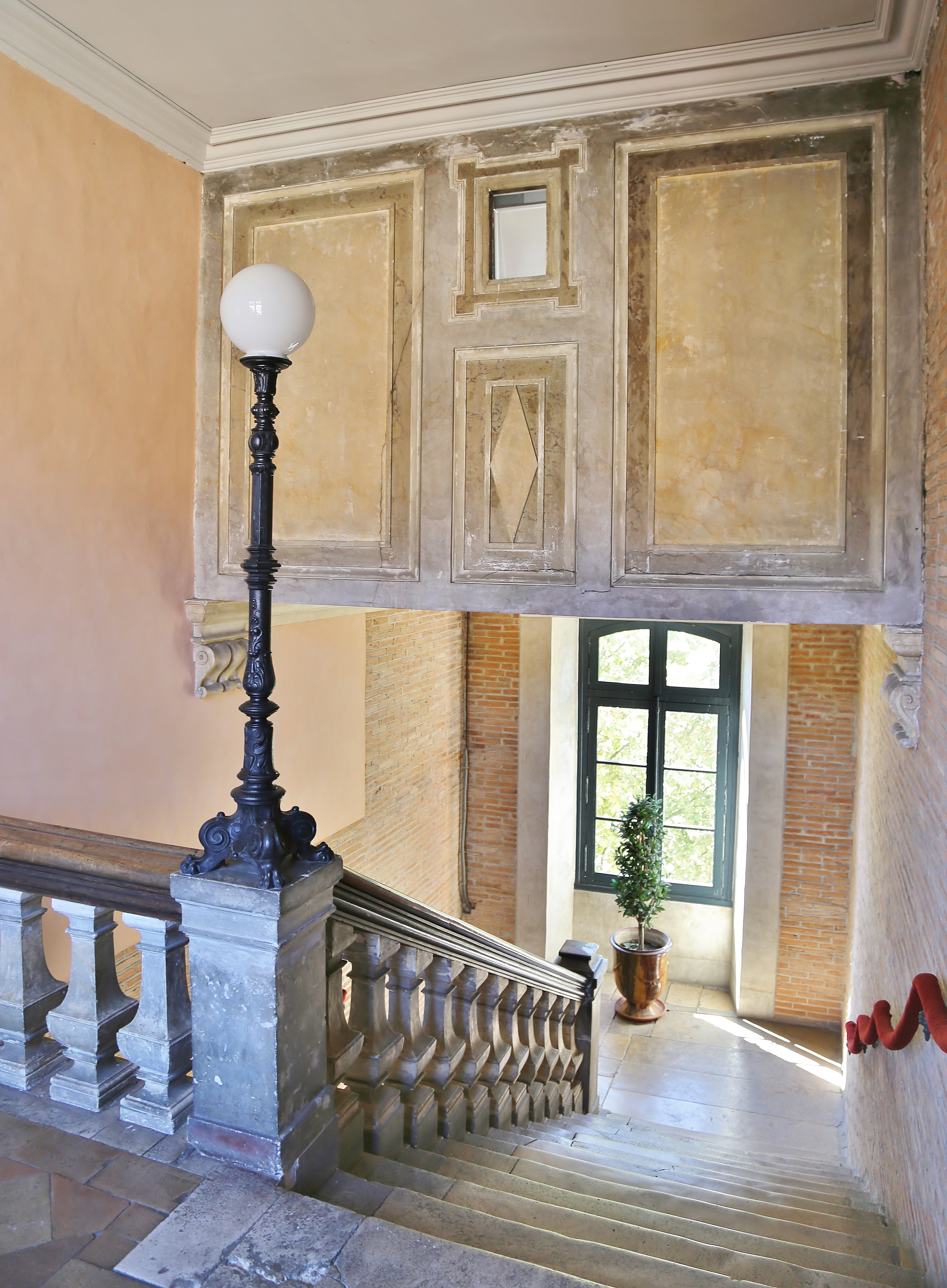
Top of the grand stair.

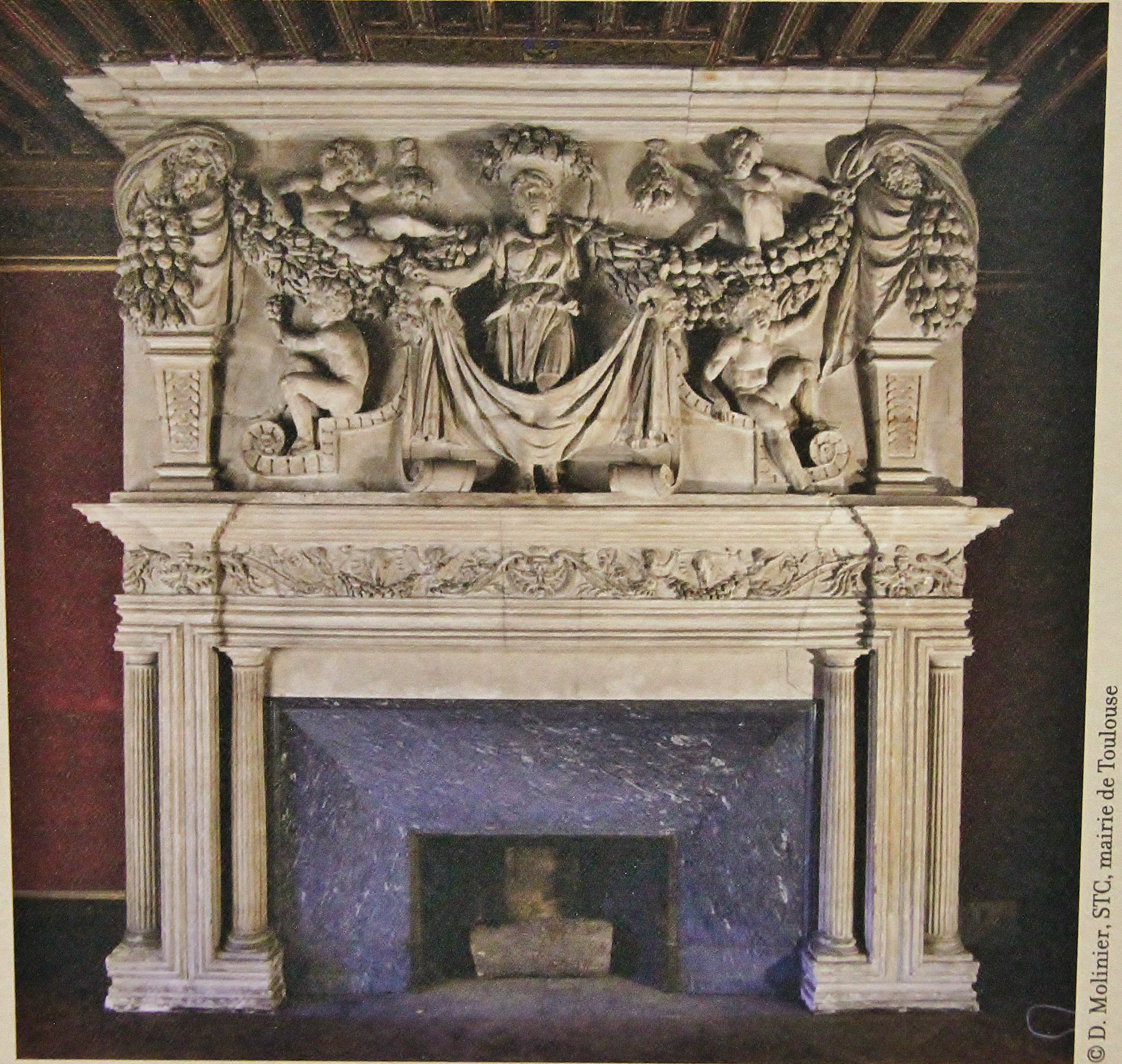
Monumental fireplace.

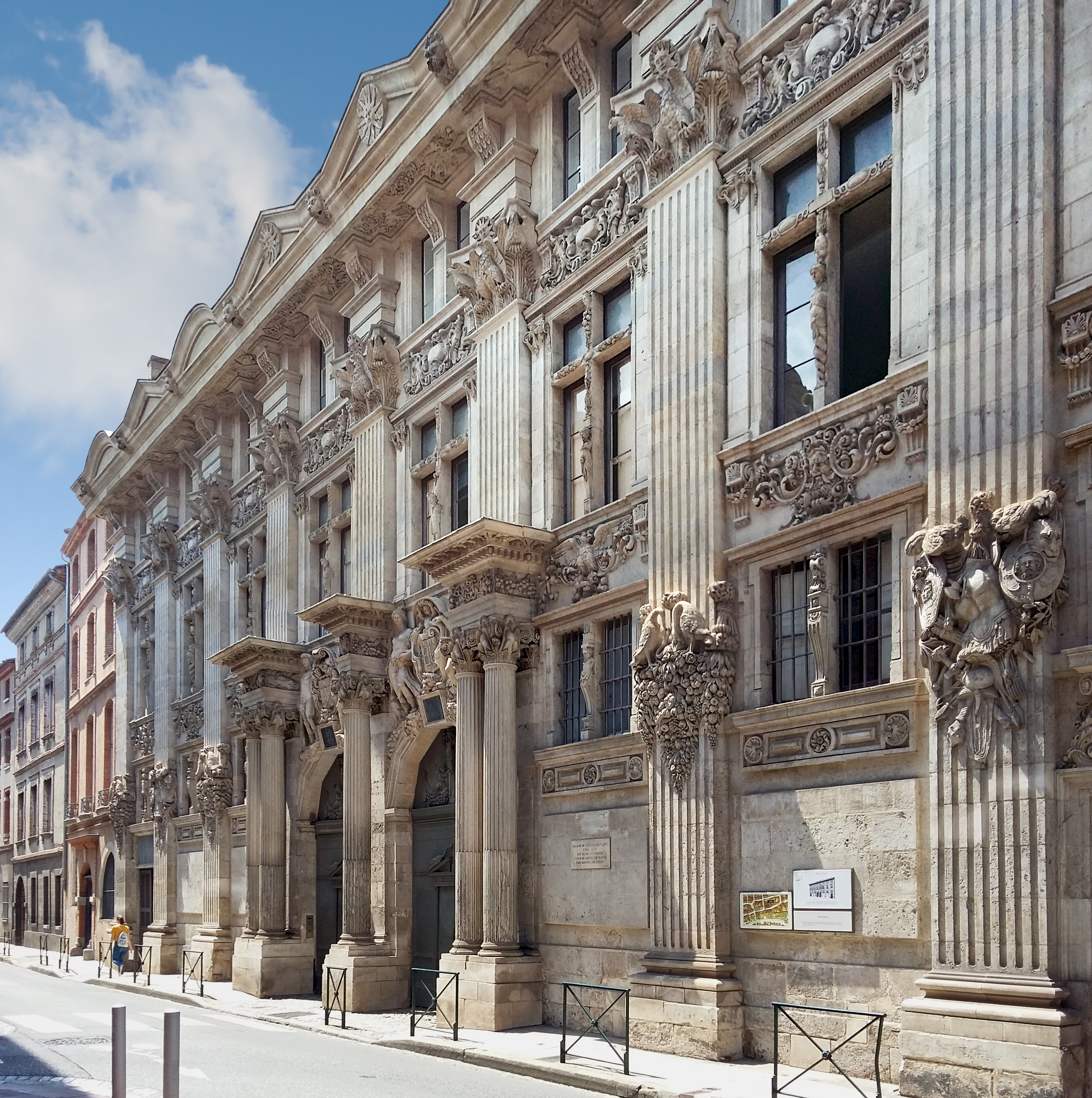
Hôtel de Clary (Hôtel de pierre): street façade.

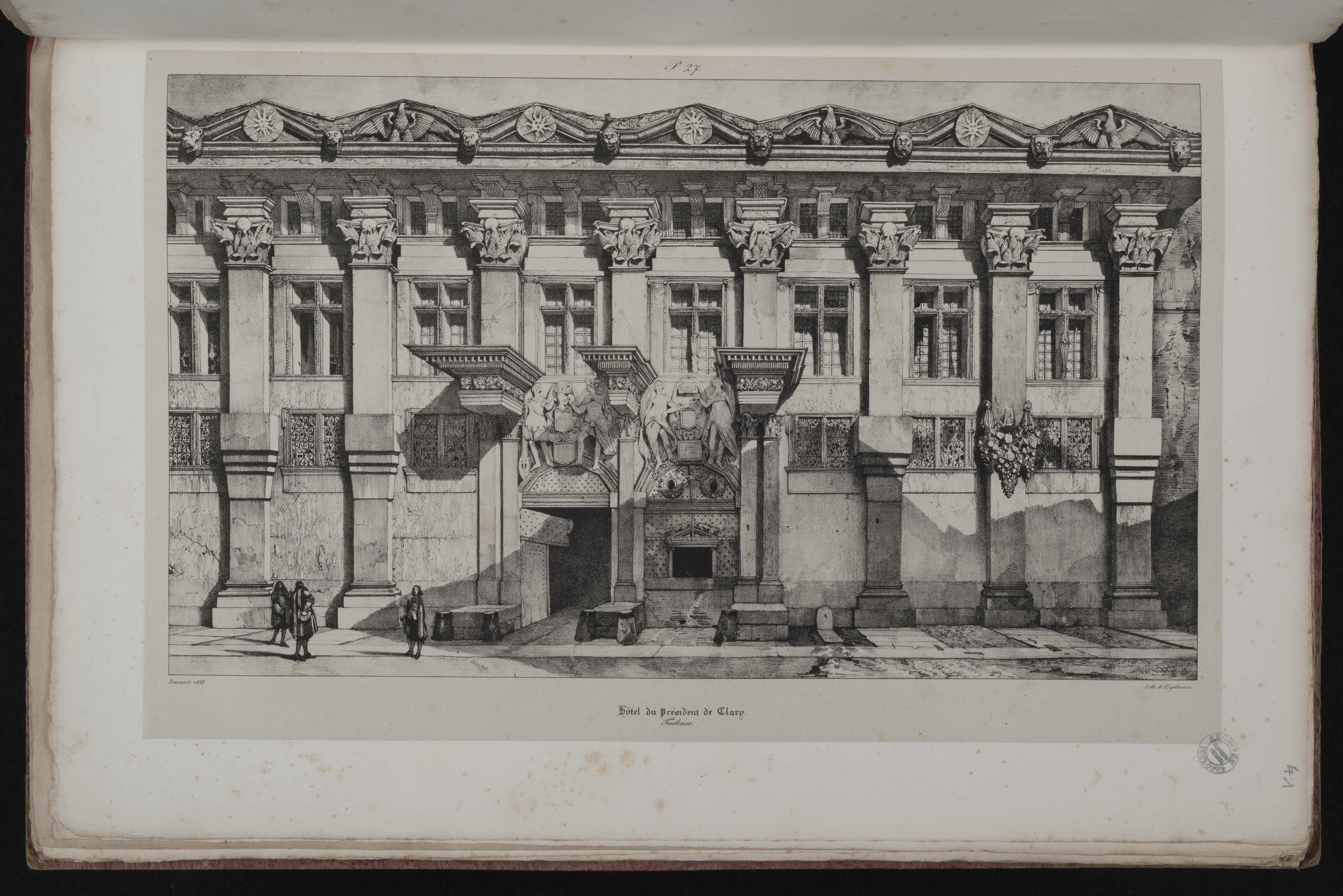
Hôtel de Clary: 1833 drawing showing façade completion at that date.

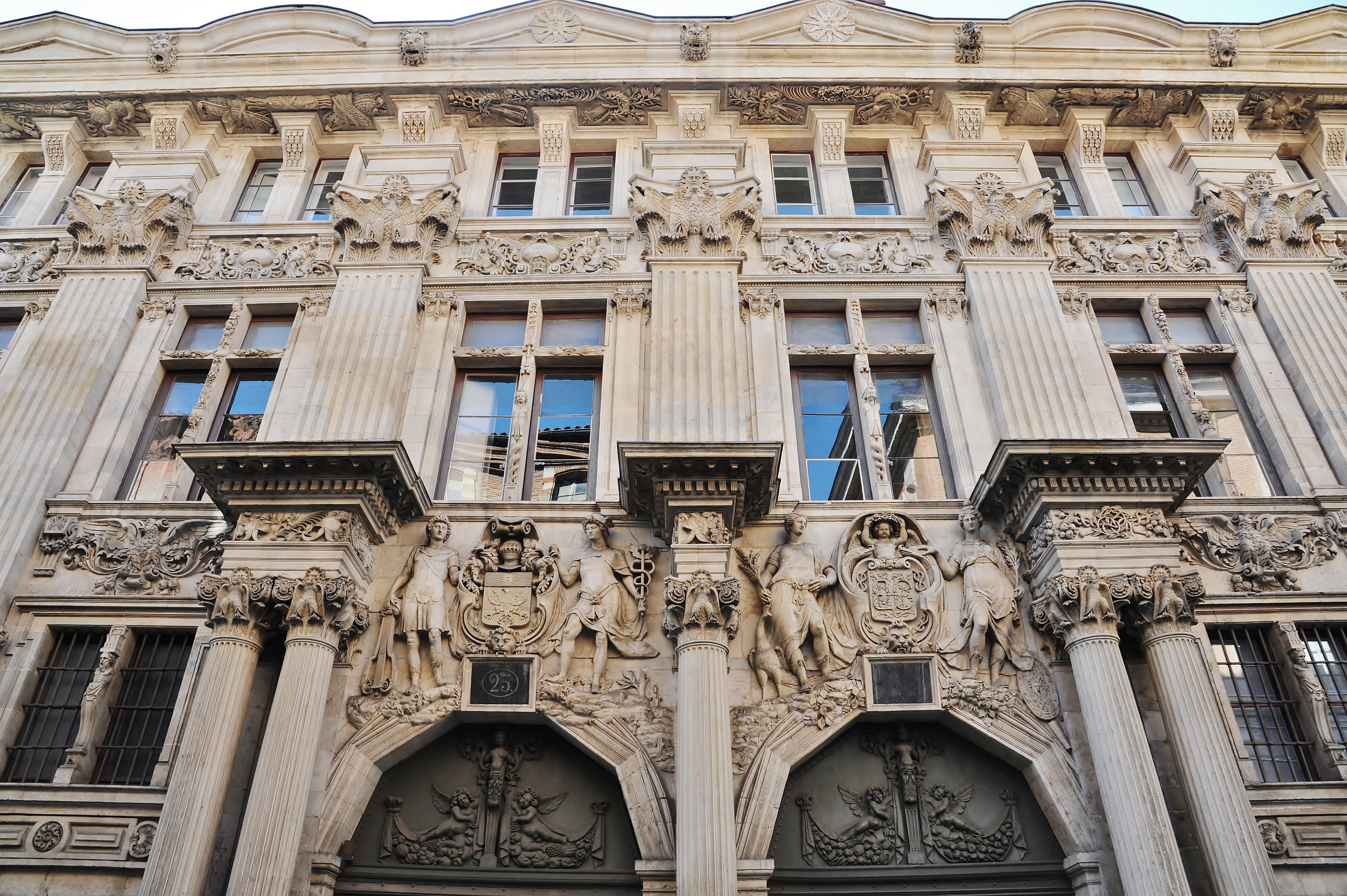
Hôtel de Clary.

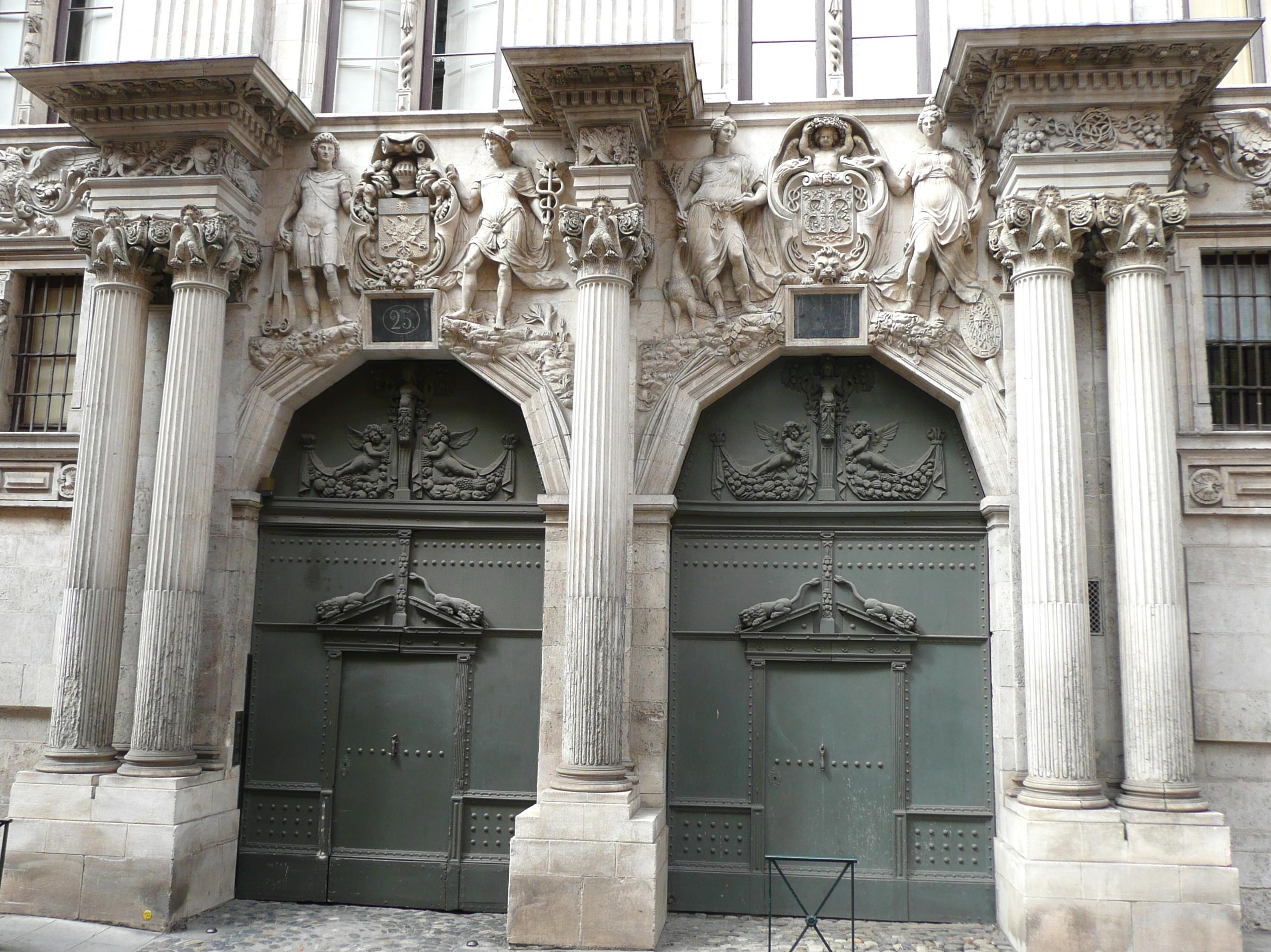
Hôtel de Clary: portals.

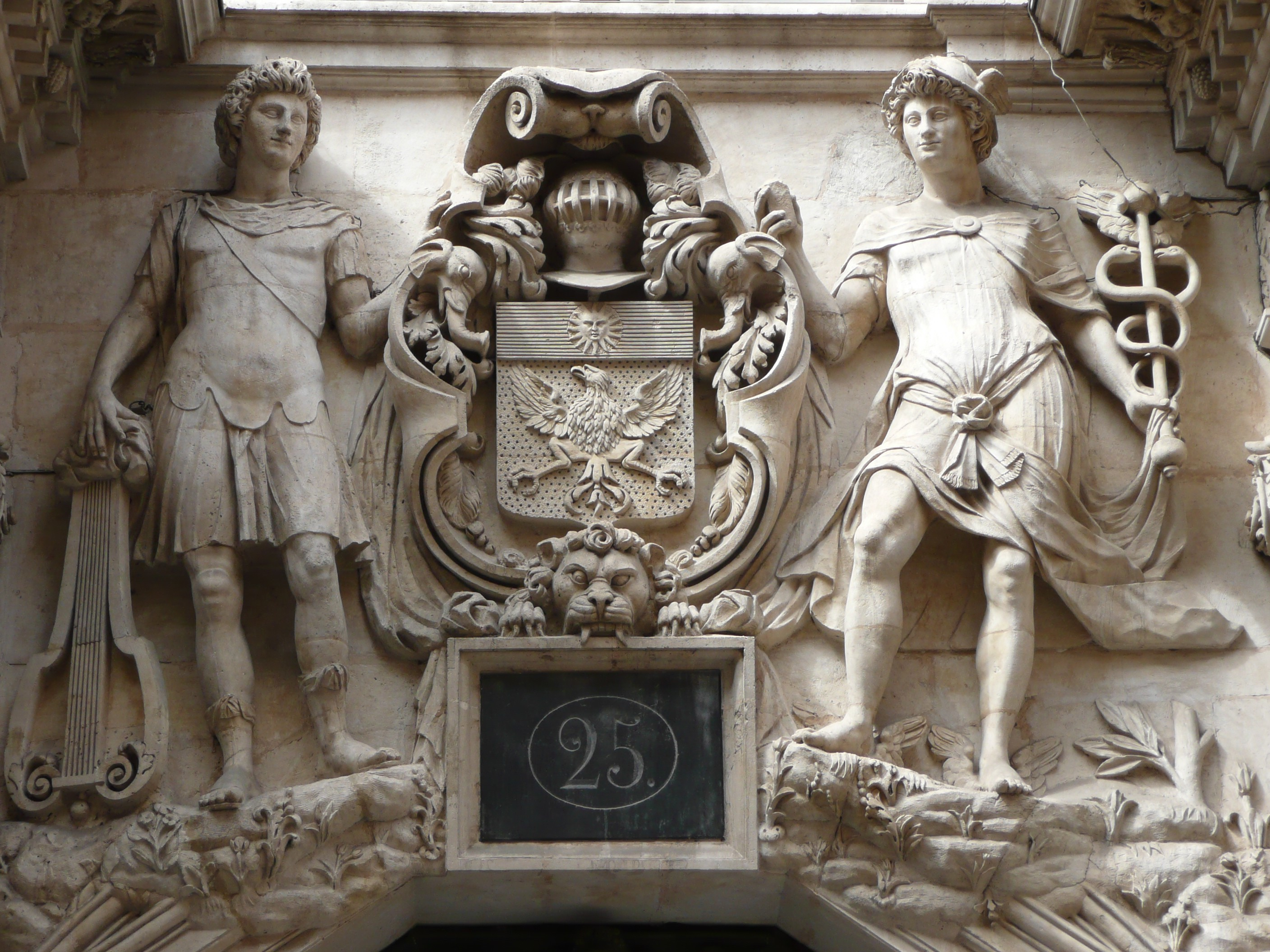
Hôtel de Clary: Apollo and Mercury above the entrance.

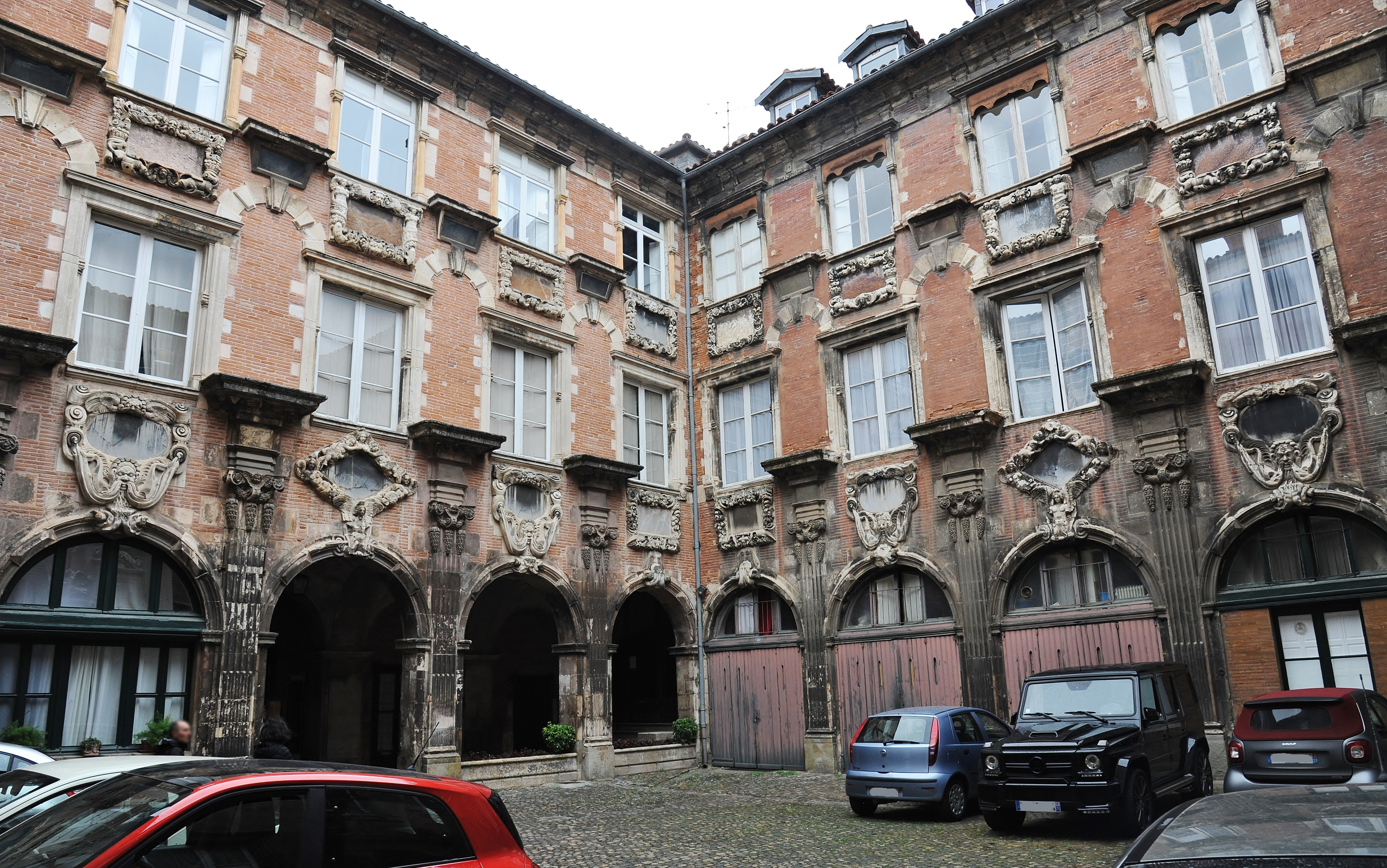
Hôtel de Clary: court façades.

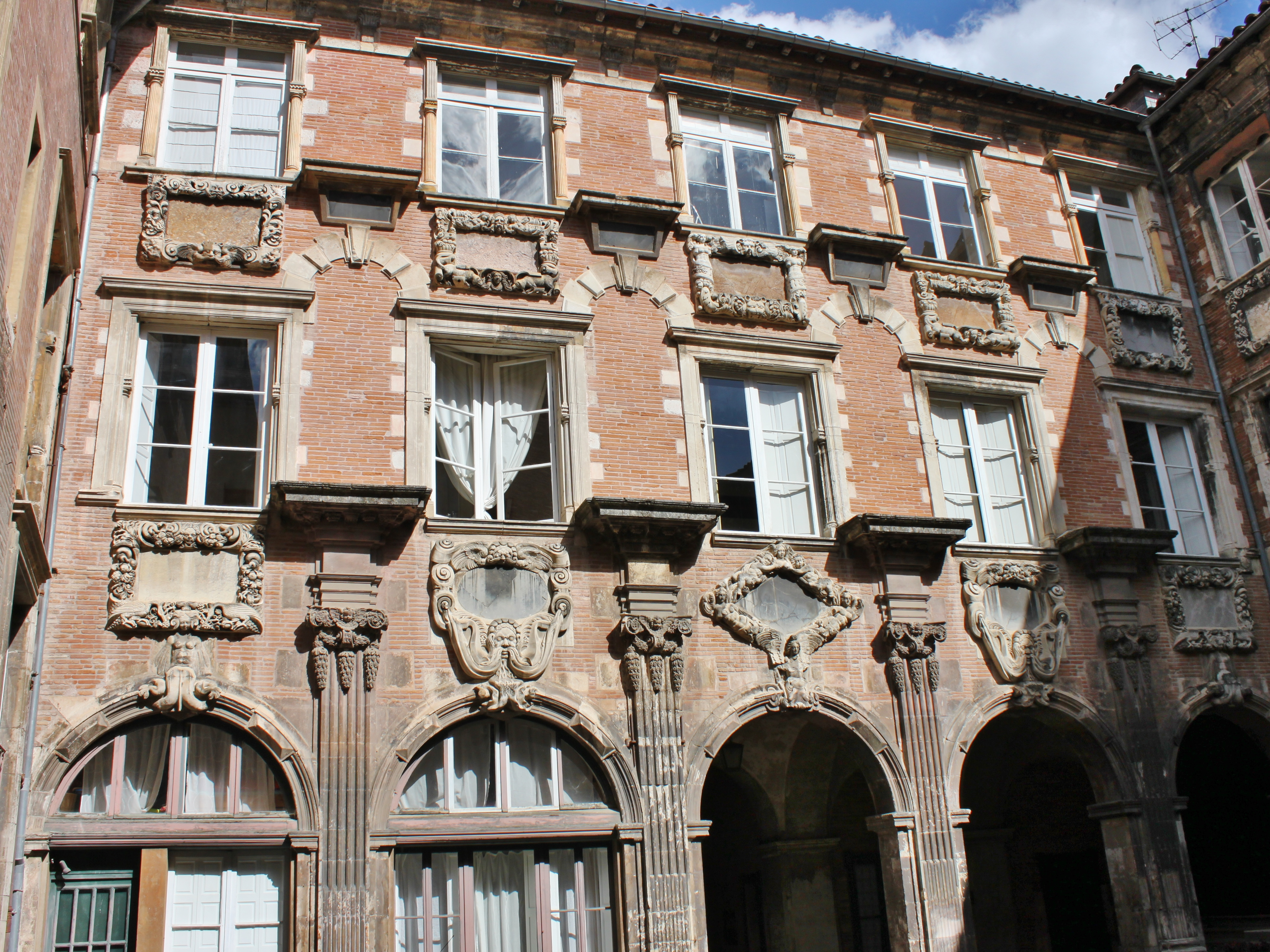
Clary: court.

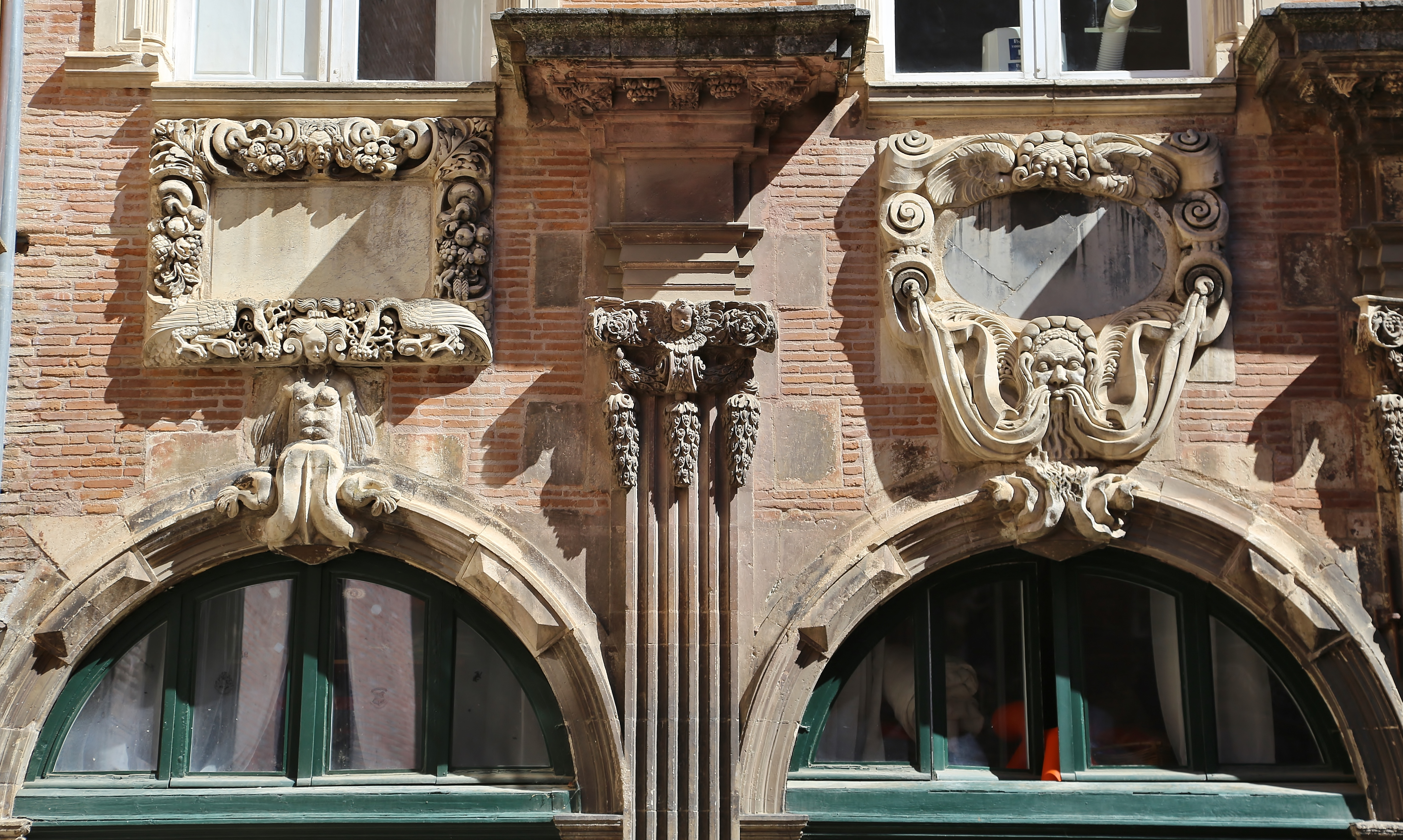
Clary: court.

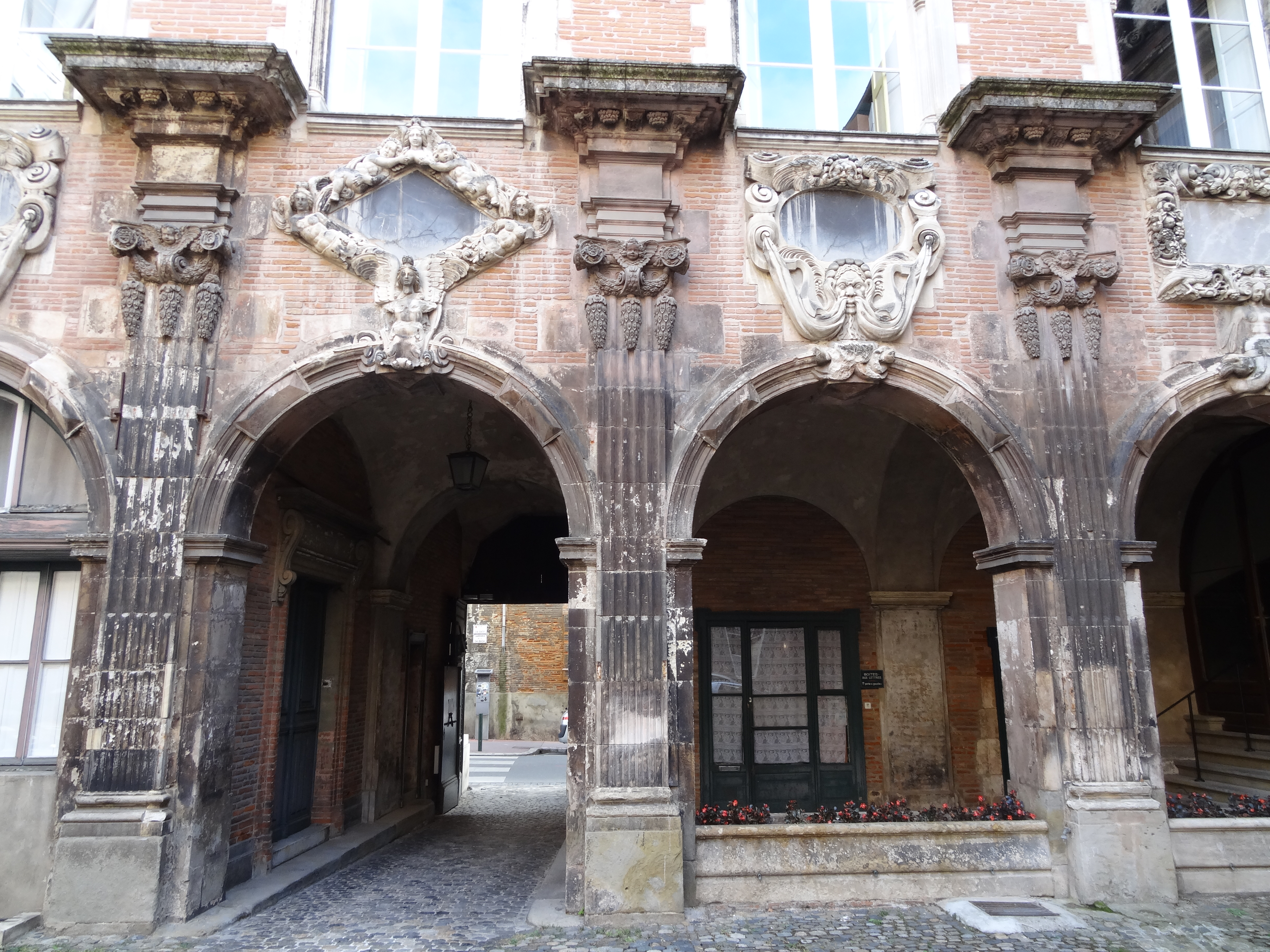
Clary: court.

==== Hôtel de Bernuy ====
Address: 1 rue Gambetta.

From Burgos to Toulouse at the end of the 15th century to enter the woad trade, Jean de Bernuy succeeded so well that in 1502 he launched the first building campaign of his townhouse, notably erecting the fine Gothic stair-tower. Between 1520 and 1536 a second campaign went to architect Louis Privat, who developed Renaissance vocabulary abundantly in a second court, achieving, in historian Paul Mesplé’s words, “a union of Spain, Italy and the Loire under the Toulouse sky”.

The stone Renaissance court is dominated by an extraordinary lowered vault, a real tour de force, whose coffering ribs and pendant roses are strictly vertical rather than following the vault’s curve.

Inspired by Italy and the Loire, the long candelabrum-columns omnipresent in the honor court also recall models in Medidas del romano by Spanish architect Diego de Sagredo (1526; French 1536). They lend exceptional monumentality to the court, whose upper gallery presents, for the first time in Toulouse, Corinthian columns whose design is taken from a treatise.

Considered a witness to the Renaissance’s introduction in Toulouse and a symbol of the city’s opulence, this court has been partially reproduced at the Cité de l’architecture et du patrimoine to illustrate Early Renaissance style in France.

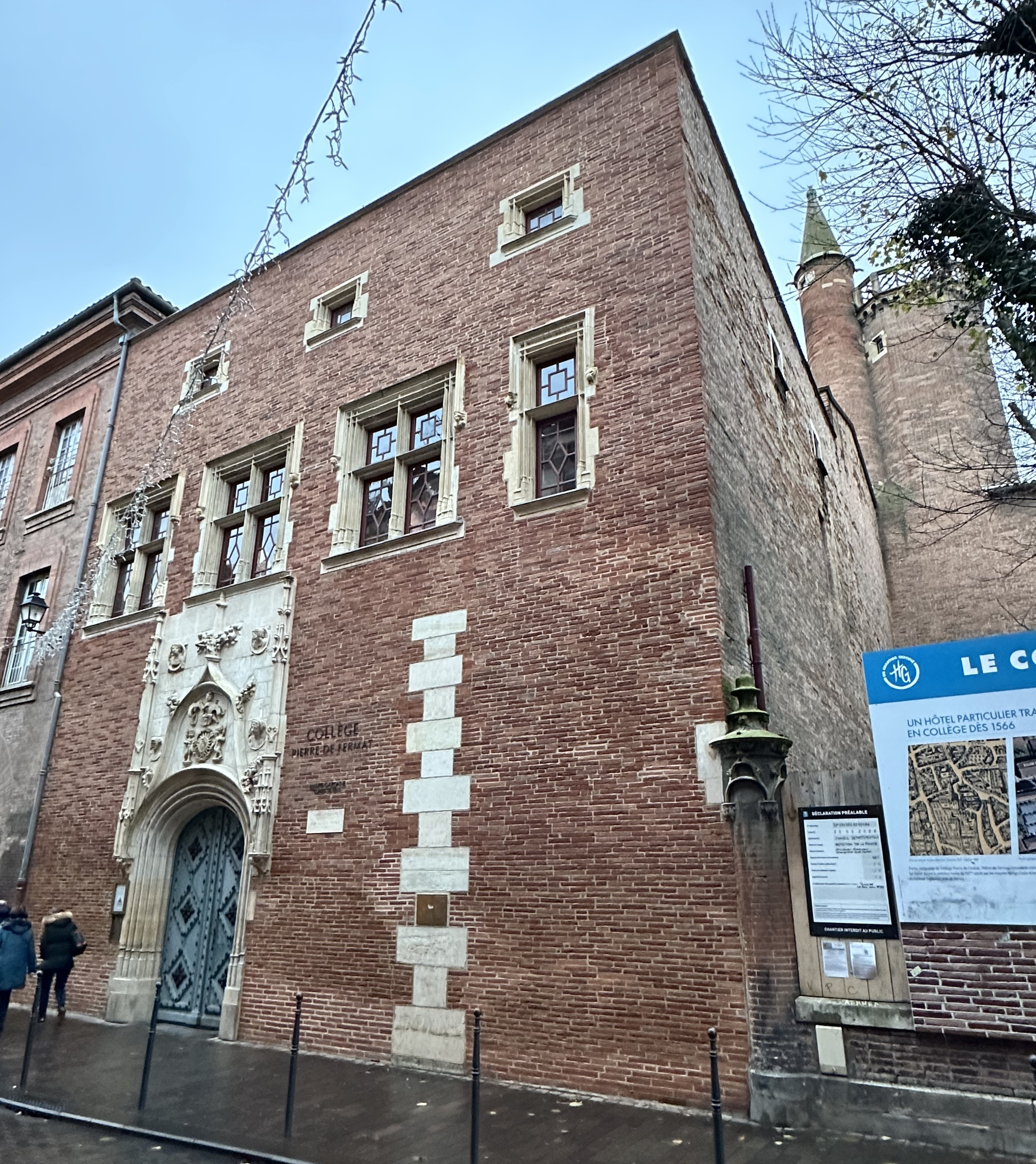
Hôtel de Bernuy.

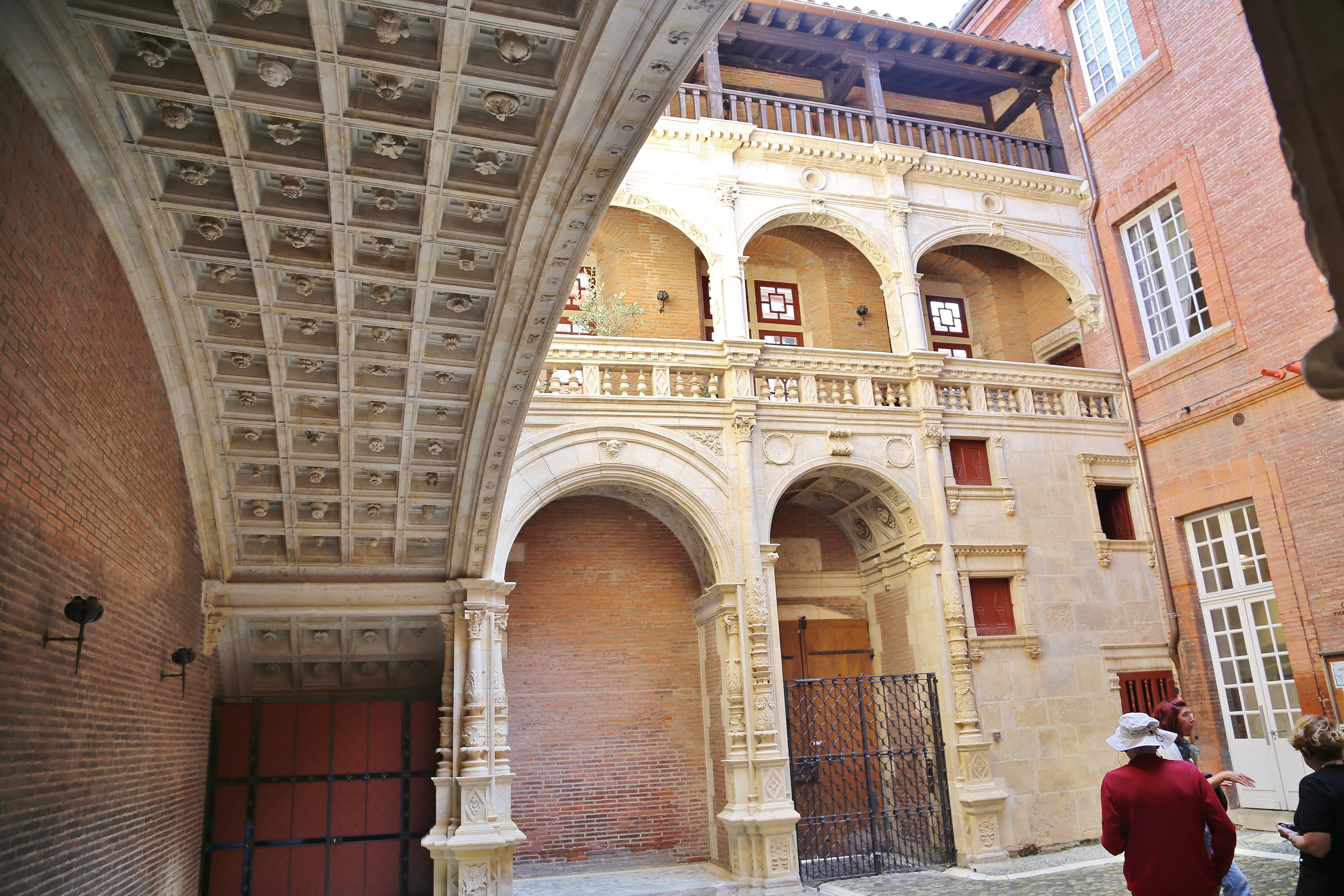
Bernuy: Renaissance court.

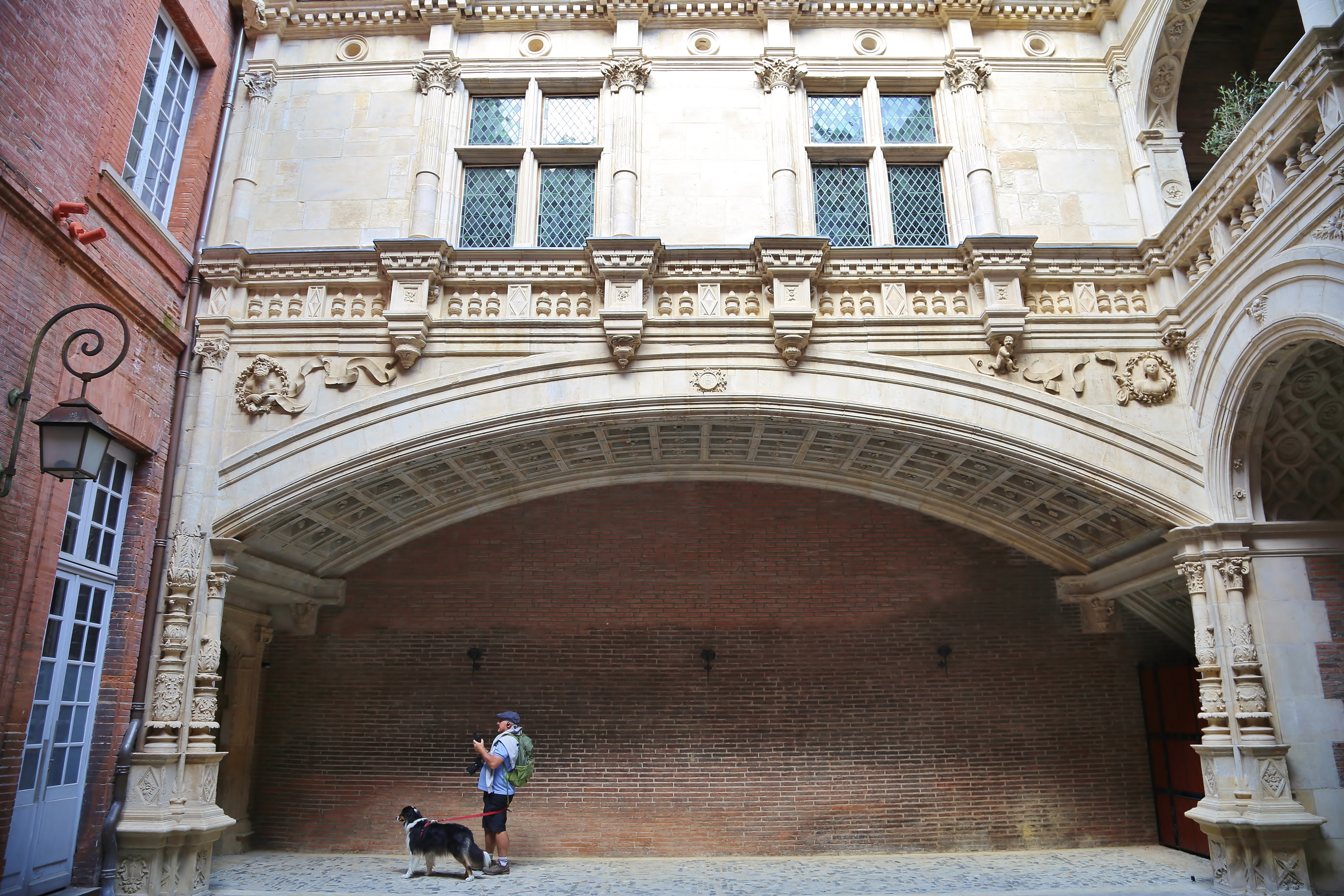
Bernuy: lowered vault.

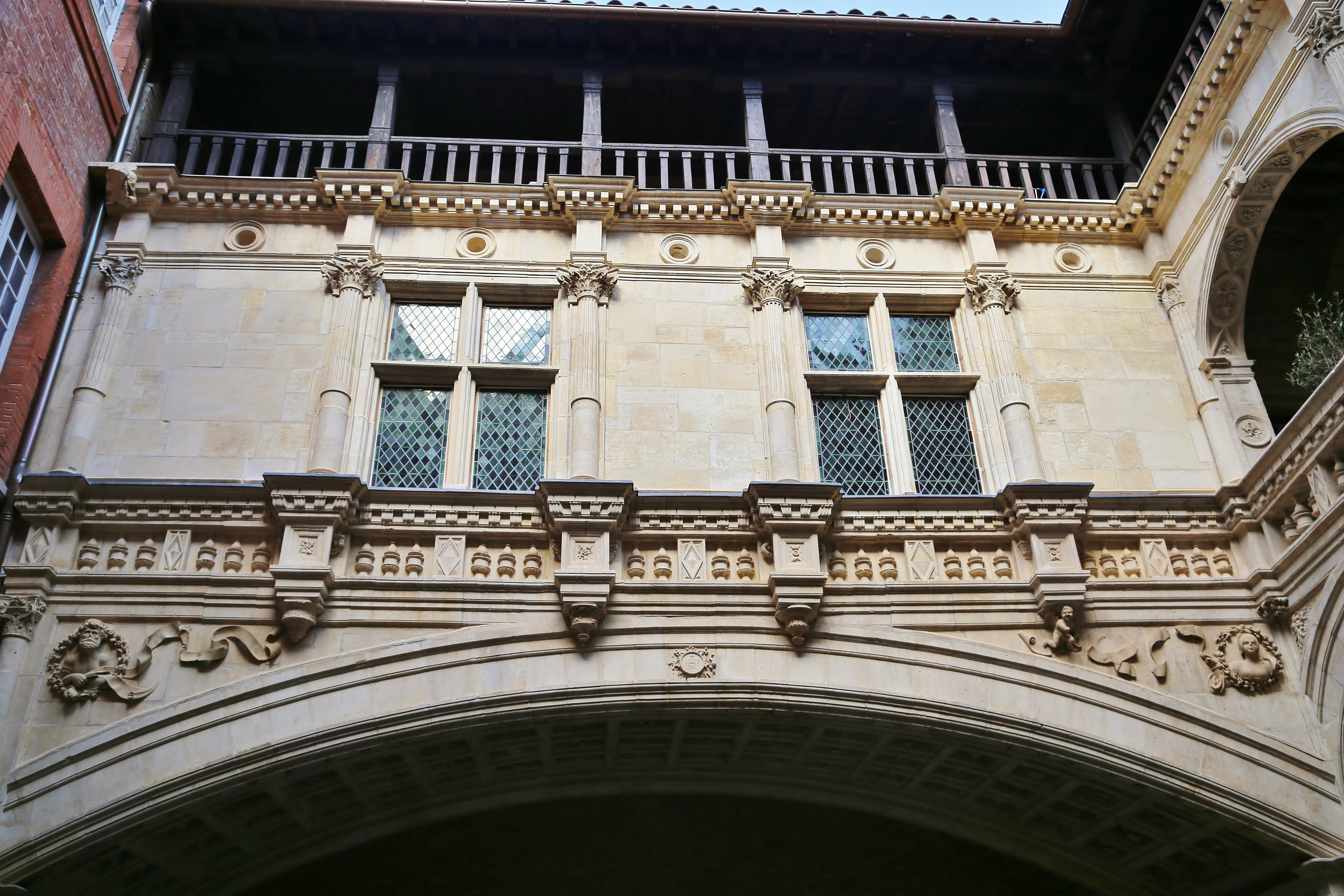
Bernuy: court windows.

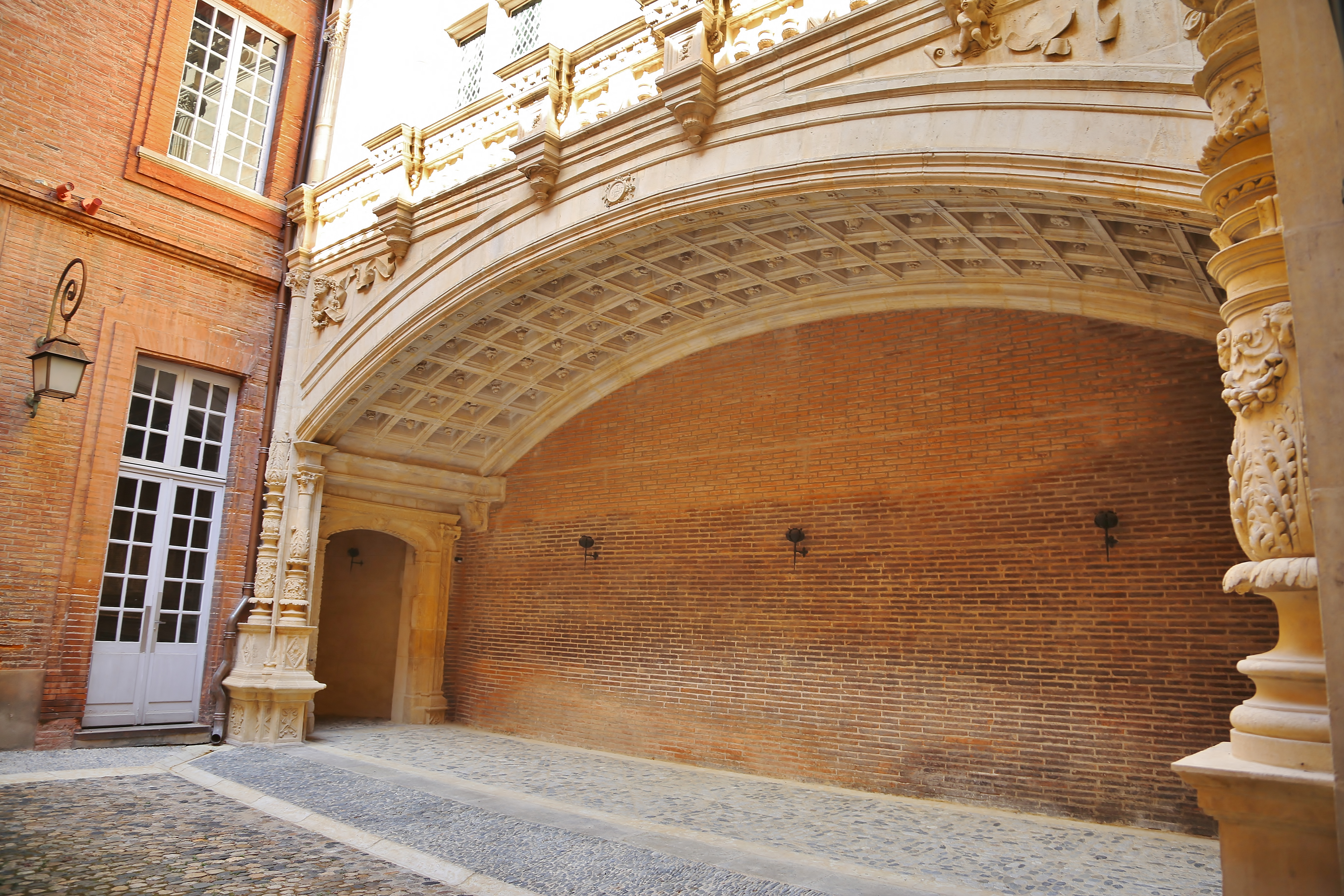
Bernuy: vault and candelabrum-columns.

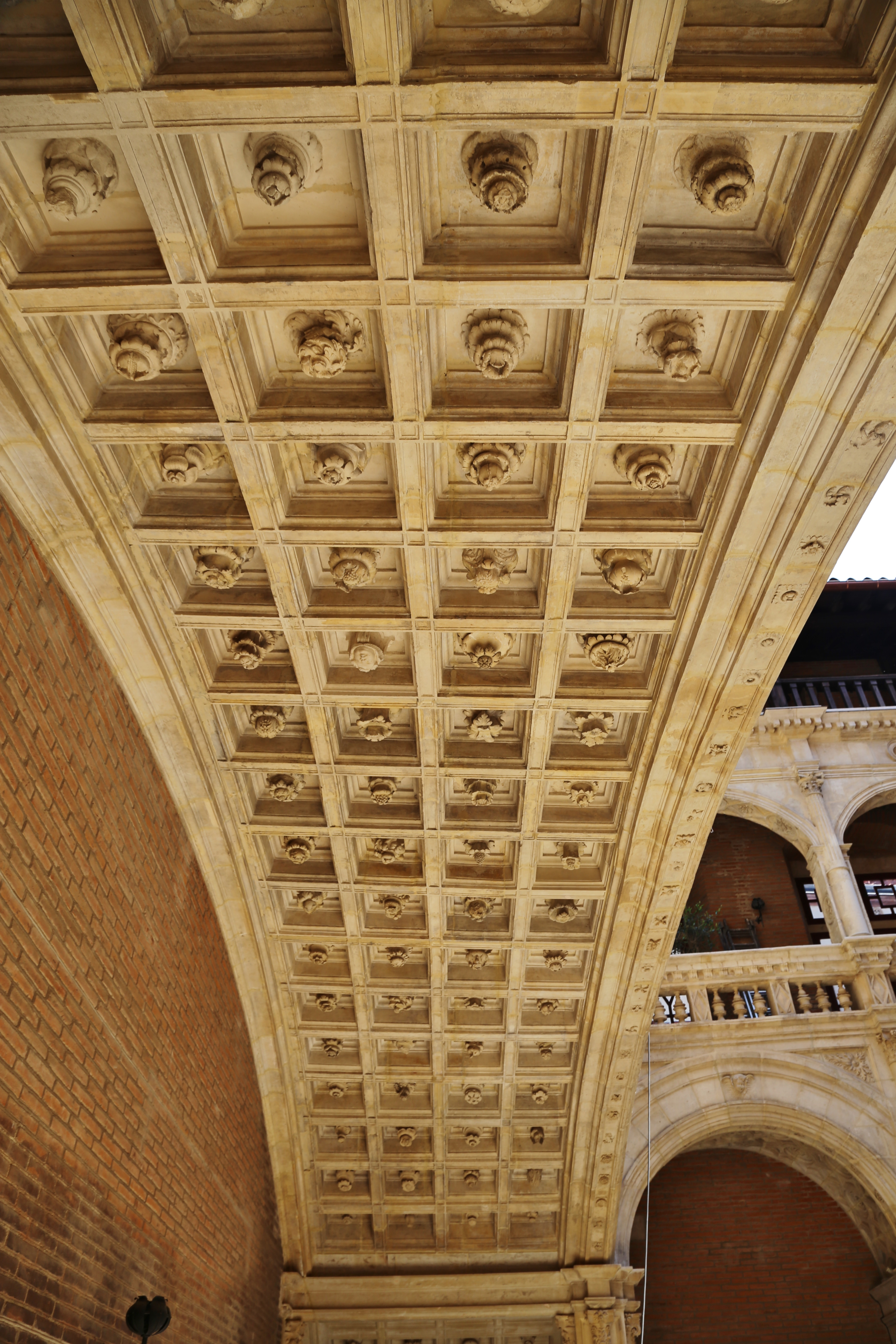
Bernuy: coffers of the vault.

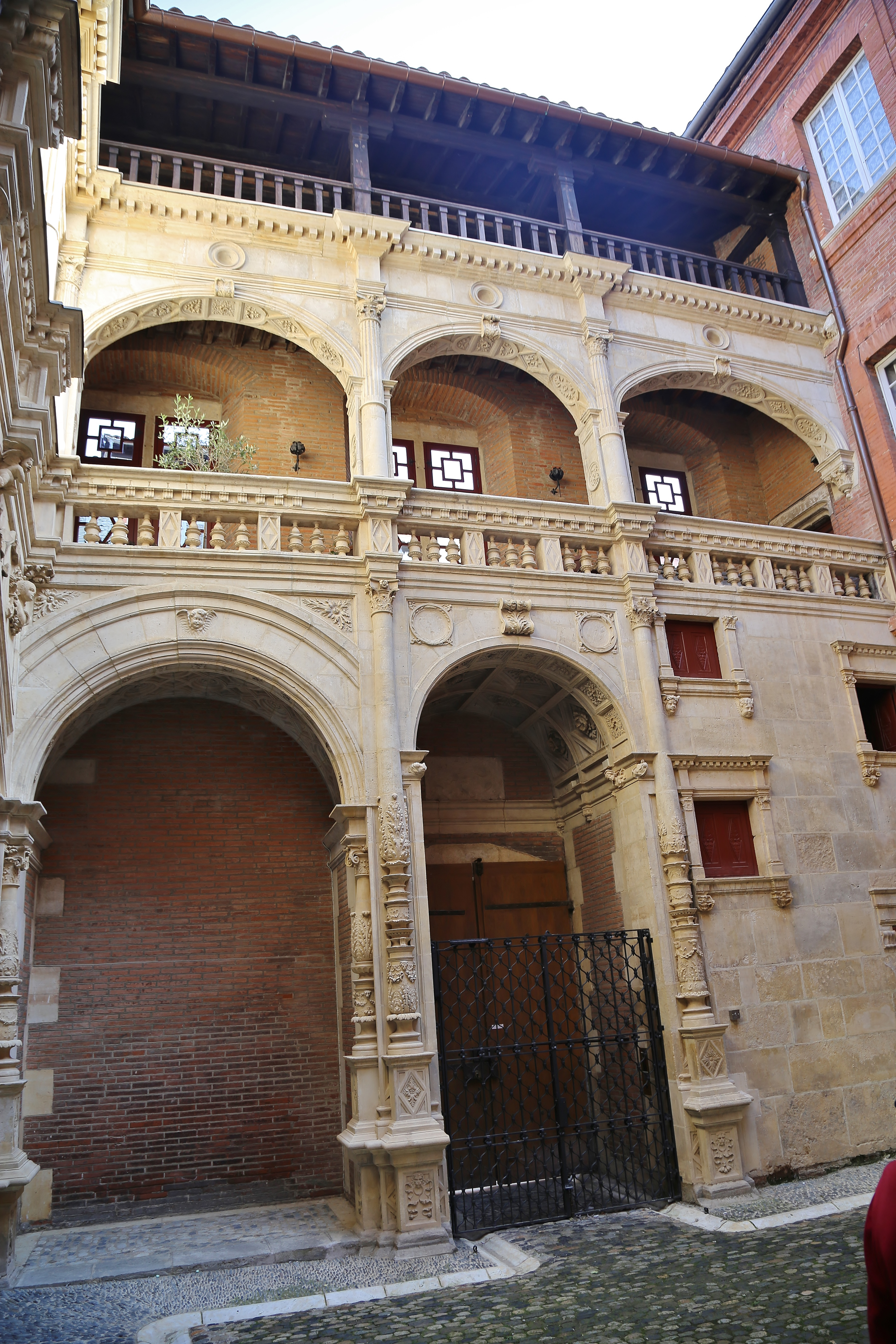
Bernuy: gallery above the portal.

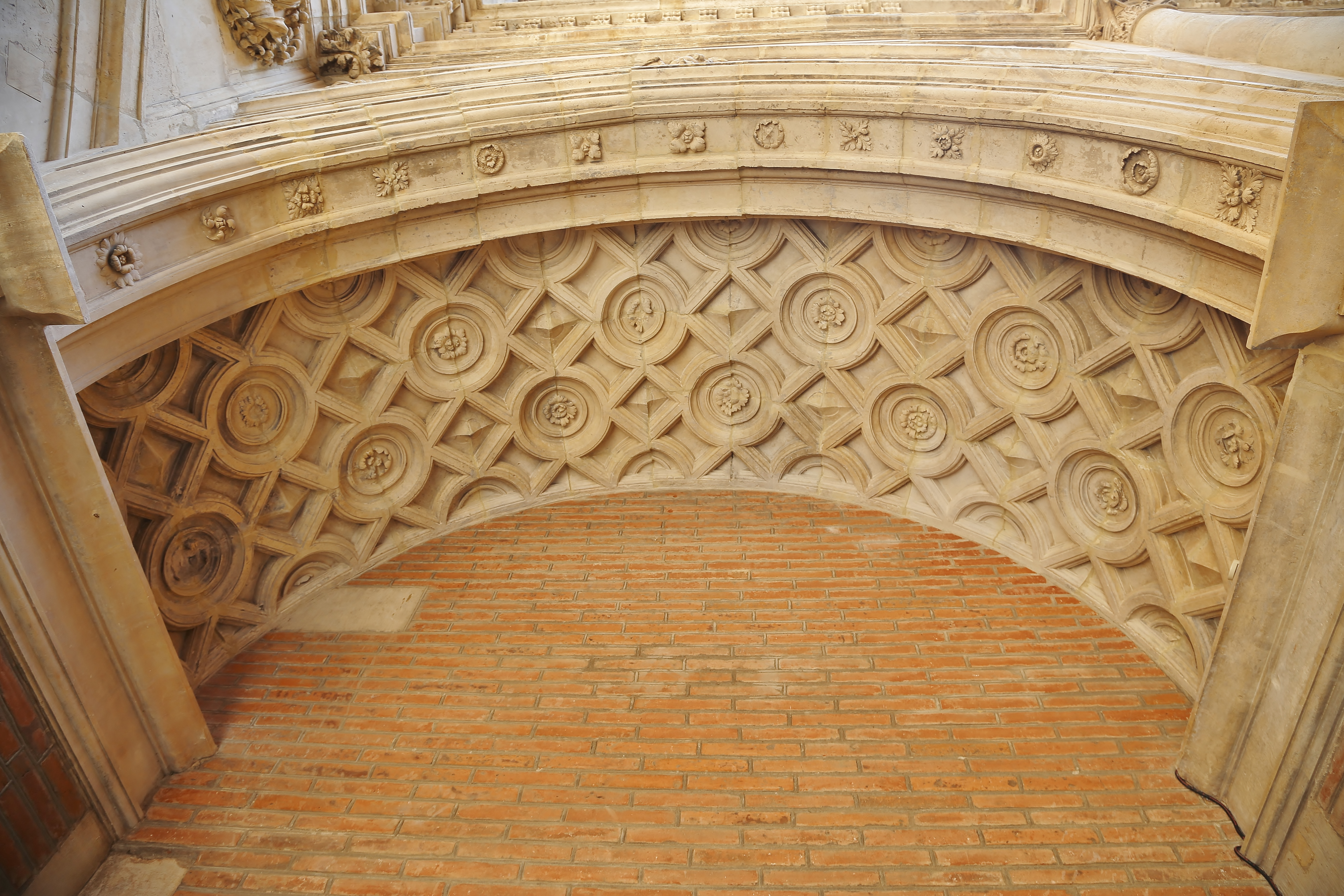
Bernuy.

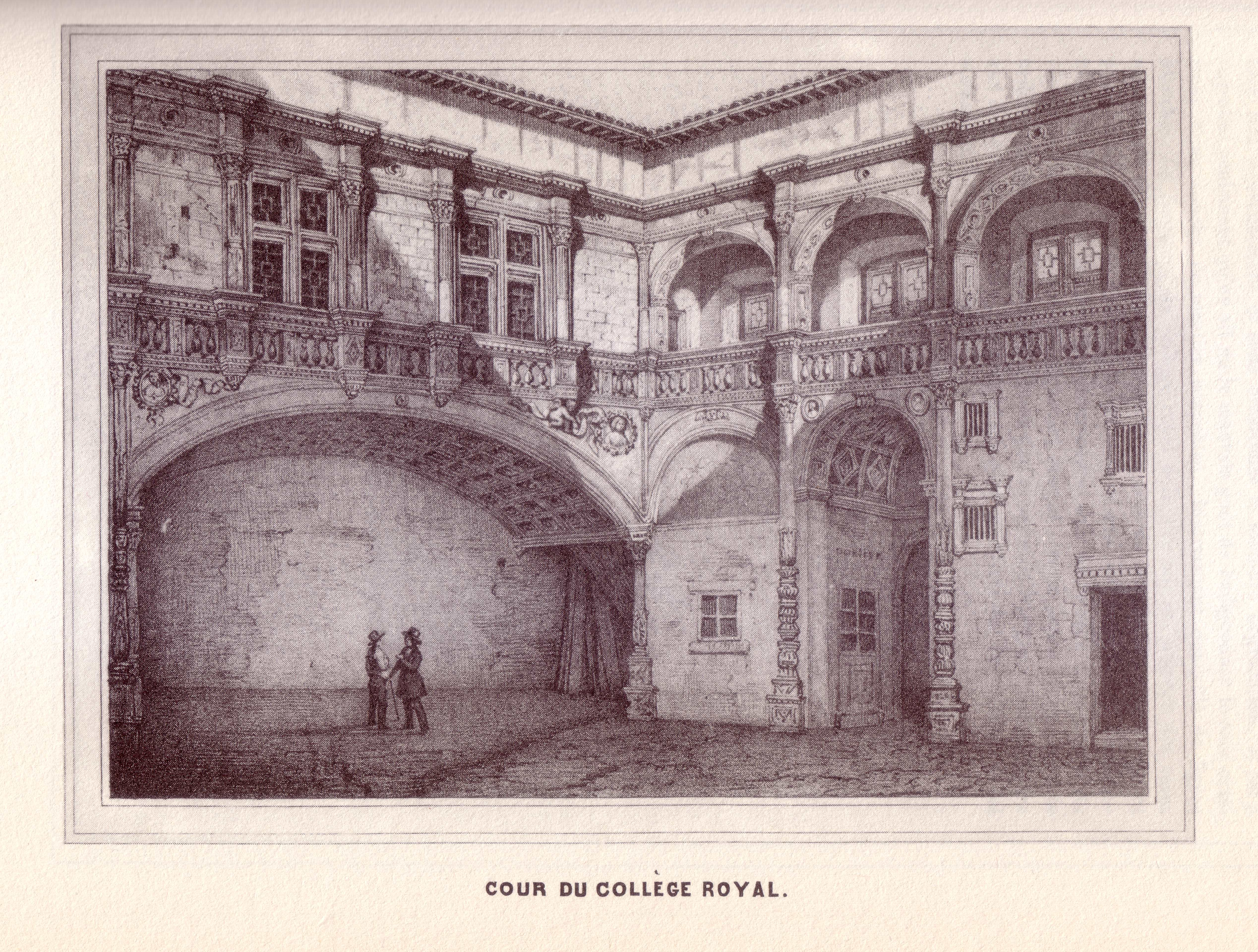
Bernuy: 19th-century drawing of the court.

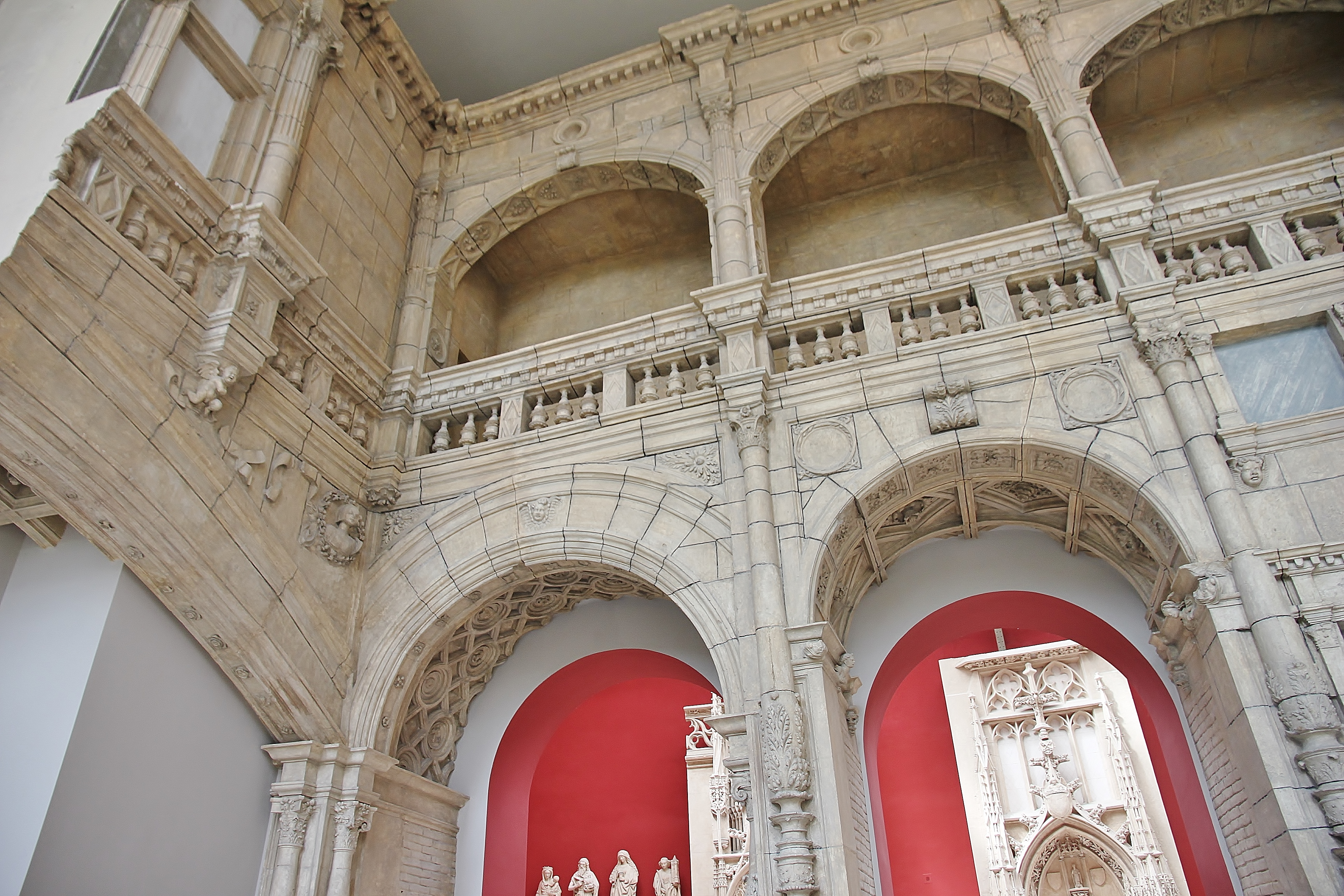
Bernuy: cast of the court at the Cité de l’architecture et du patrimoine.

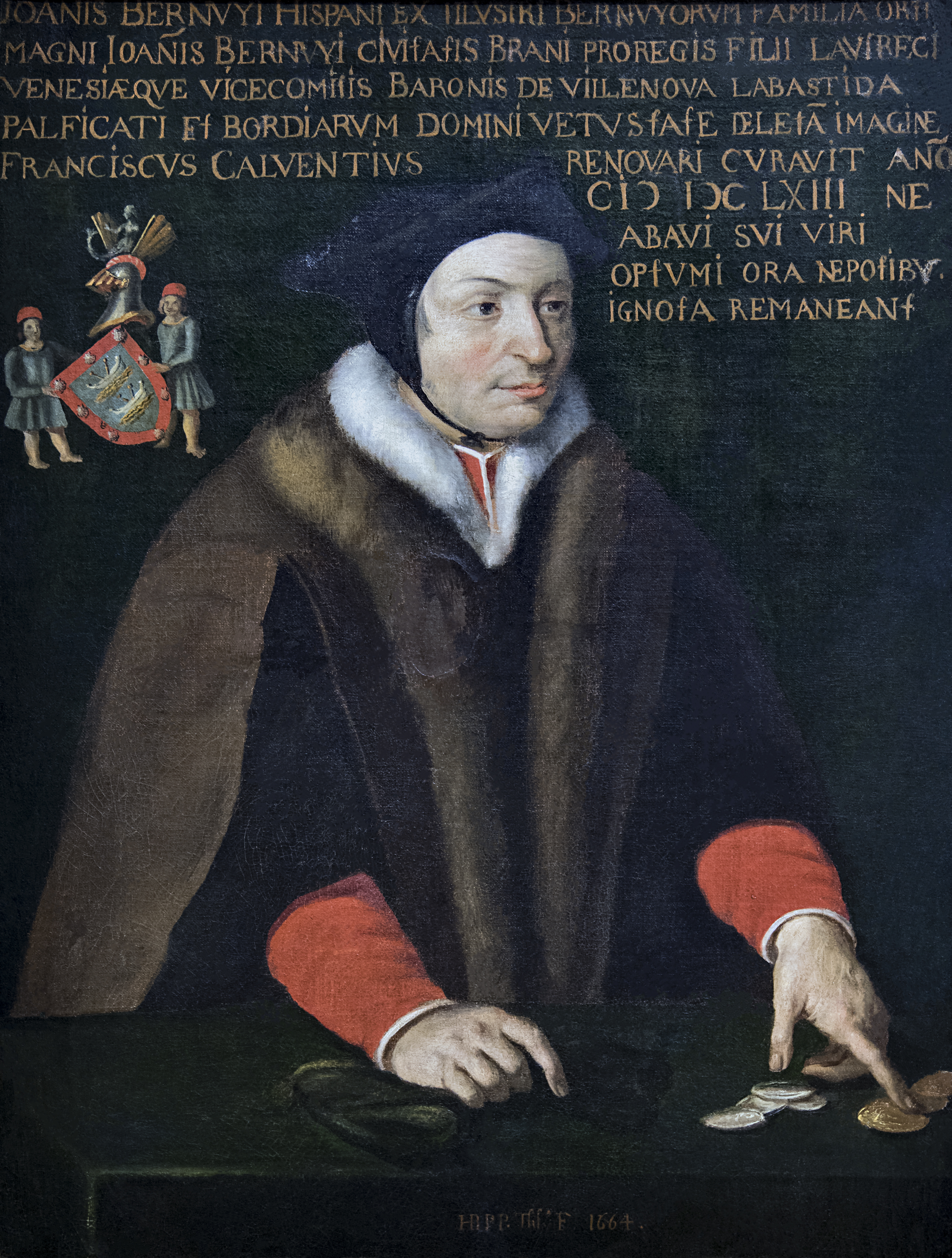
Portrait of Jean de Bernuy.

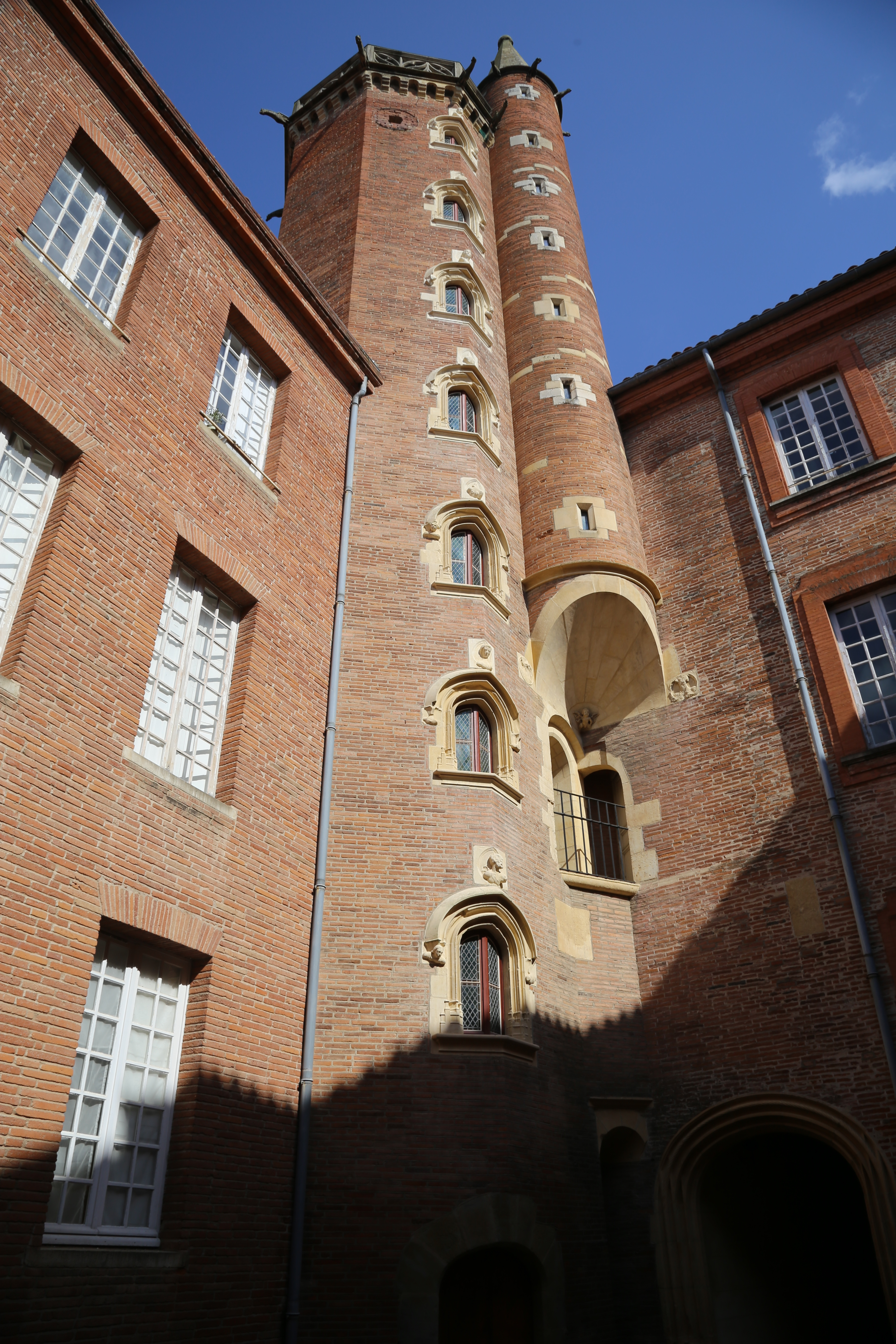
Gothic tower (1504).

==== Hôtel of Guillaume de Bernuy ====
Address: 5 rue de la Pomme.

Built by architect-sculptor Nicolas Bachelier between 1540 and 1544 for Guillaume de Bernuy, clerk to the Parlement and son of the woad merchant Jean de Bernuy. Bachelier erected a two-storey building between court and garden. As at the Hôtel de Bagis, a straight stair in work marks the lodging; its bay is signaled by a monumental stone portal that assumes the honorary role of the traditional stair-tower.

For the windows, Bachelier reused the formula developed at Hôtel de Bagis, enriched with Mannerist décor inspired by the Galerie of king Francis I at Fontainebleau and engravings by Fantuzzi, Androuet du Cerceau or Léonard Thiry published only a few years earlier—evidence of the speed with which forms circulated in the Renaissance.

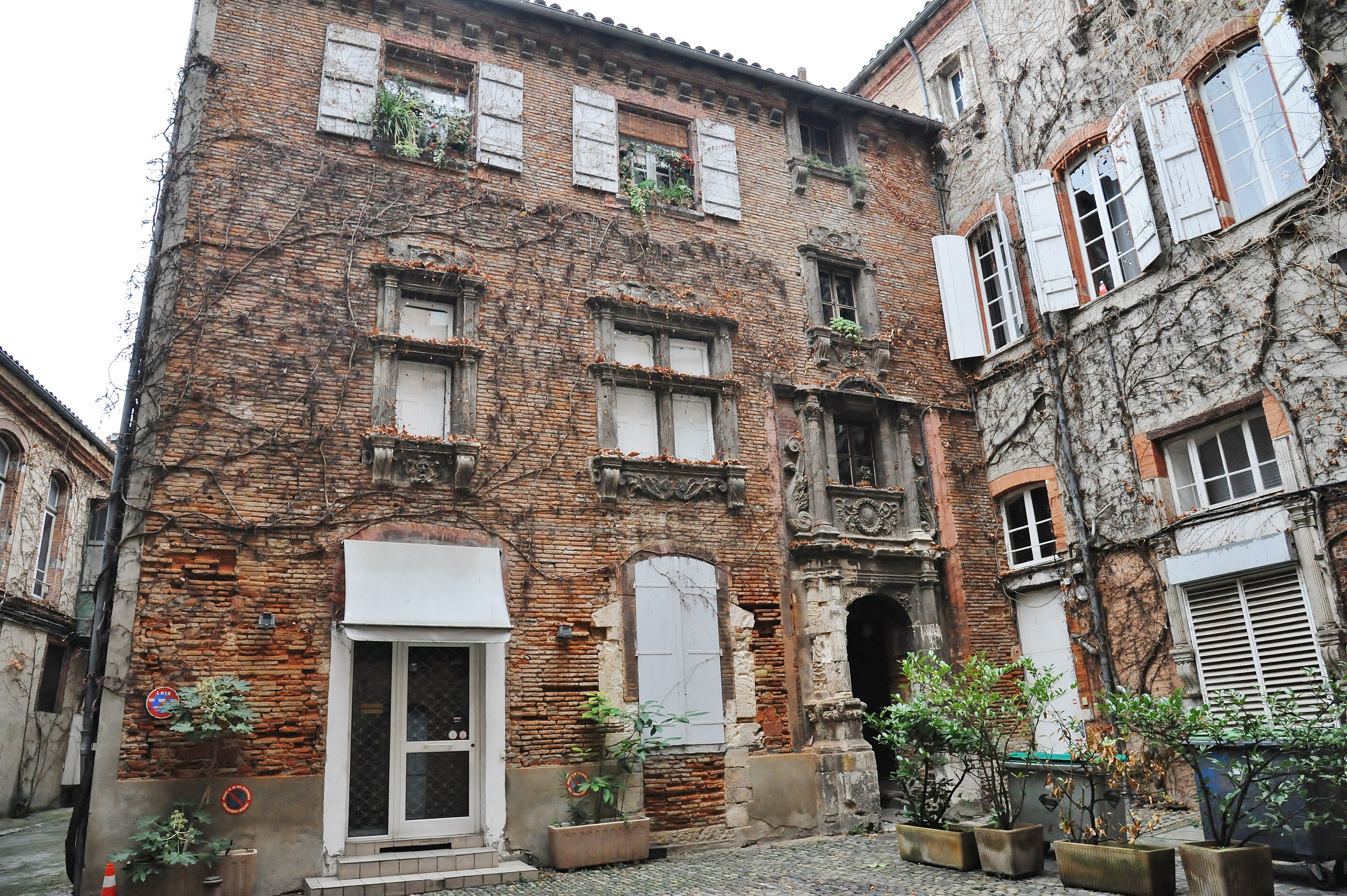
Hôtel Guillaume de Bernuy.

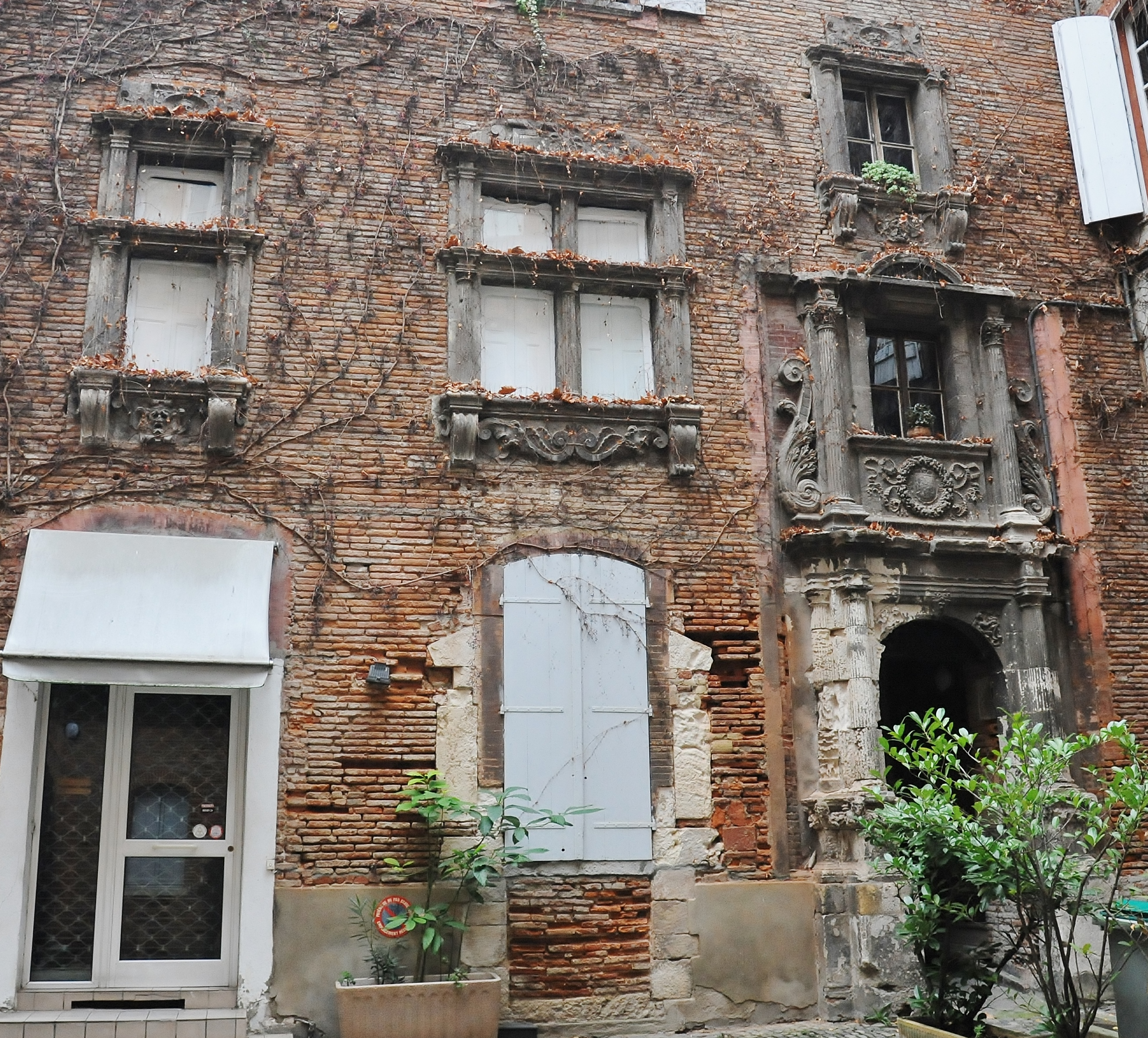
Court façade.

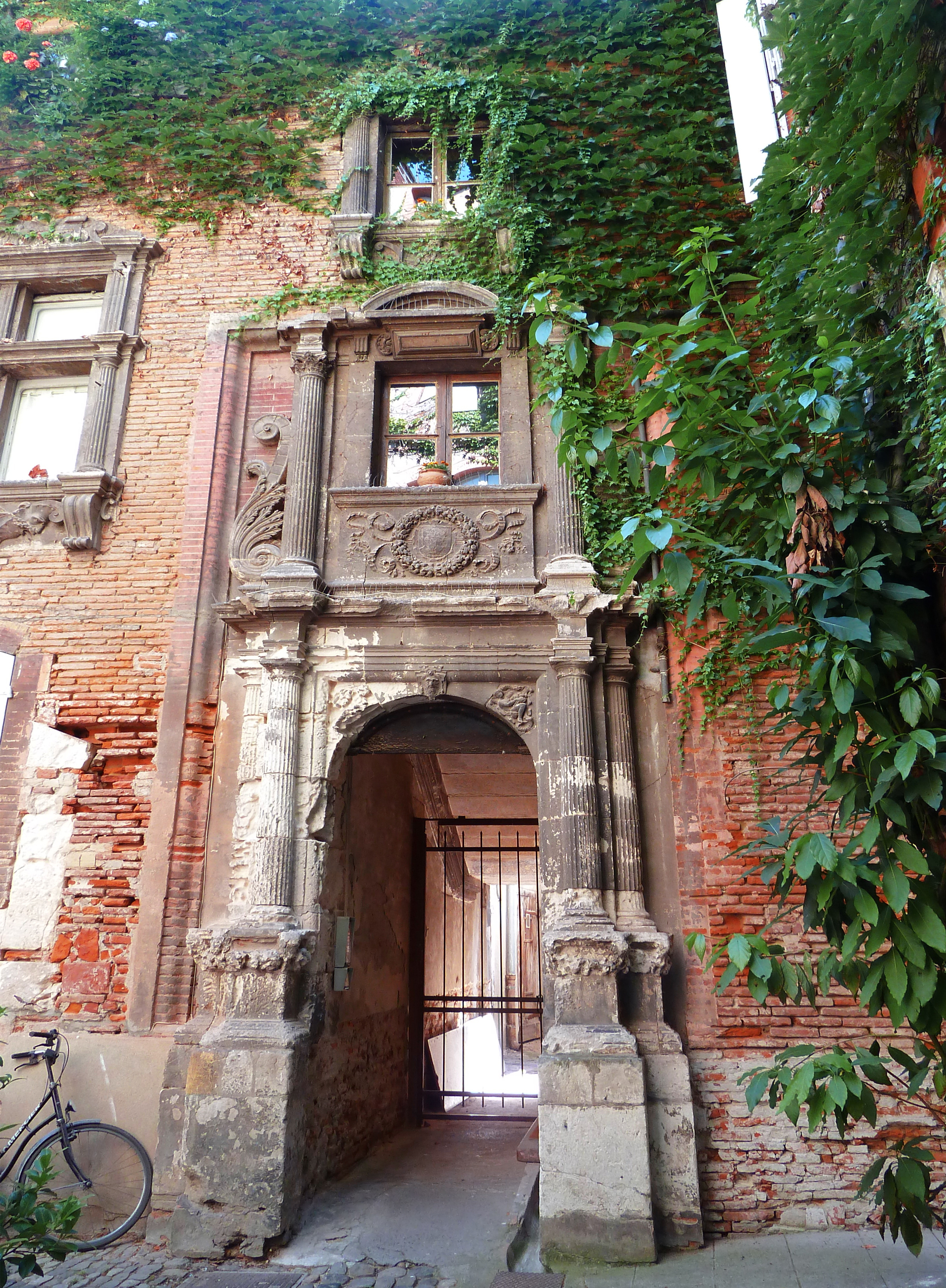
Portal.

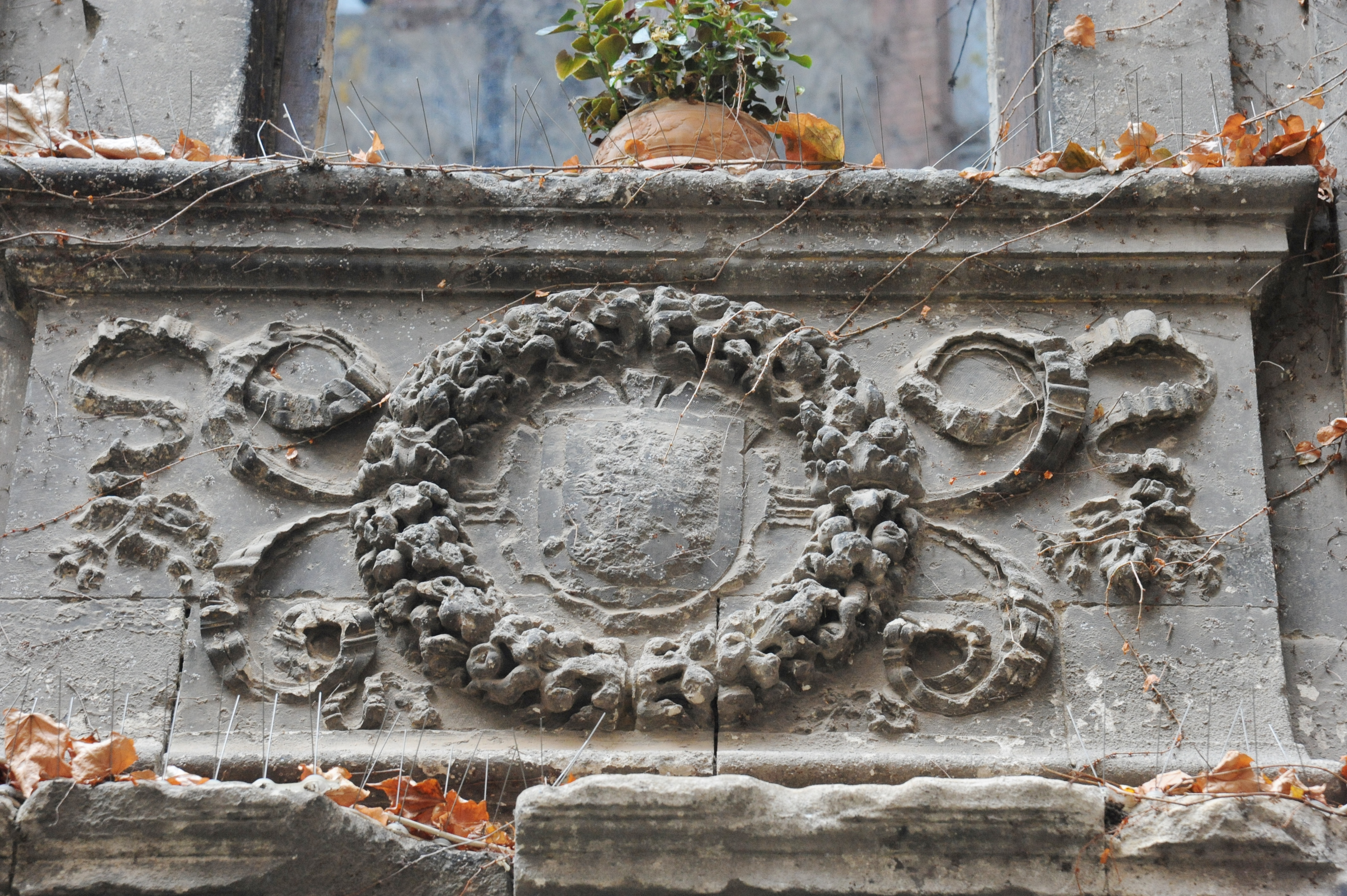
“Triumphal cap” where the owner’s arms were carved.

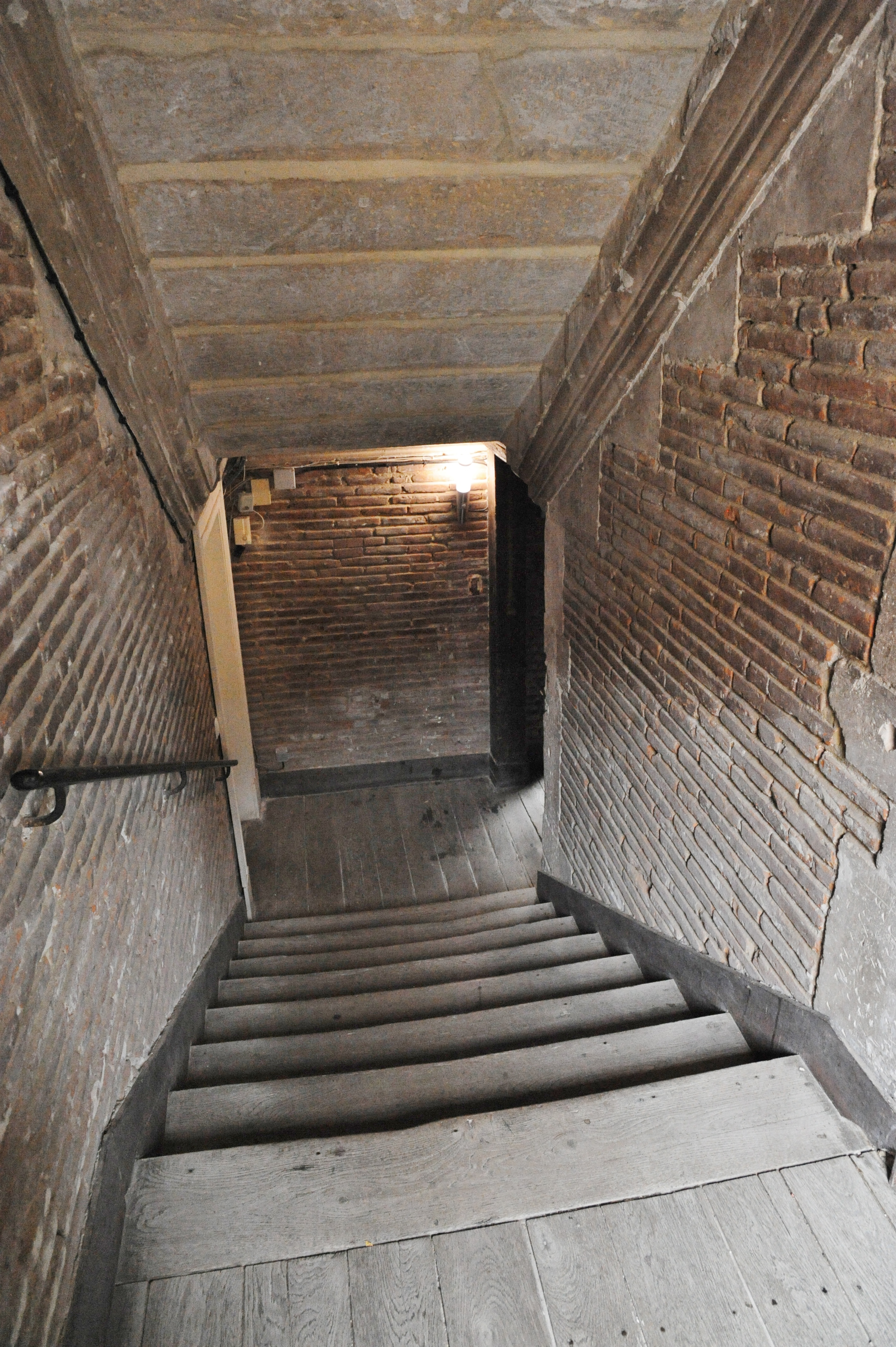
Straight-flight stair.

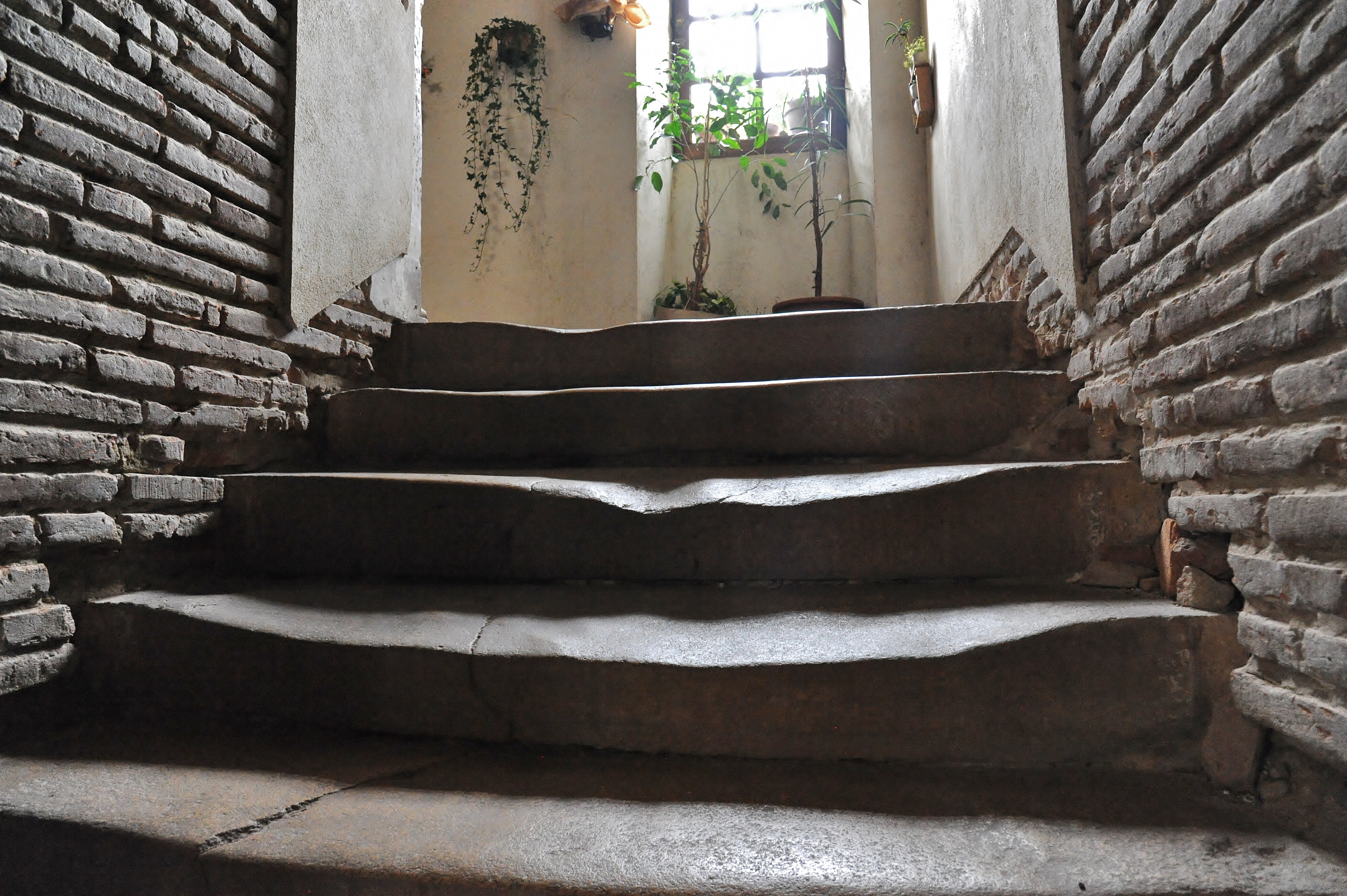
Only the upper part retains stone steps.

==== Hôtel de Boysson-Cheverry ====
Address: 11 rue Malcousinat.

In 1535, merchant Jean Cheverry bought the Hôtel de Boysson, enlarged it, and added Renaissance elements. The Gothic stair-tower received a fine Renaissance window, while on the garden (now the second court) Cheverry added an arcaded gallery.

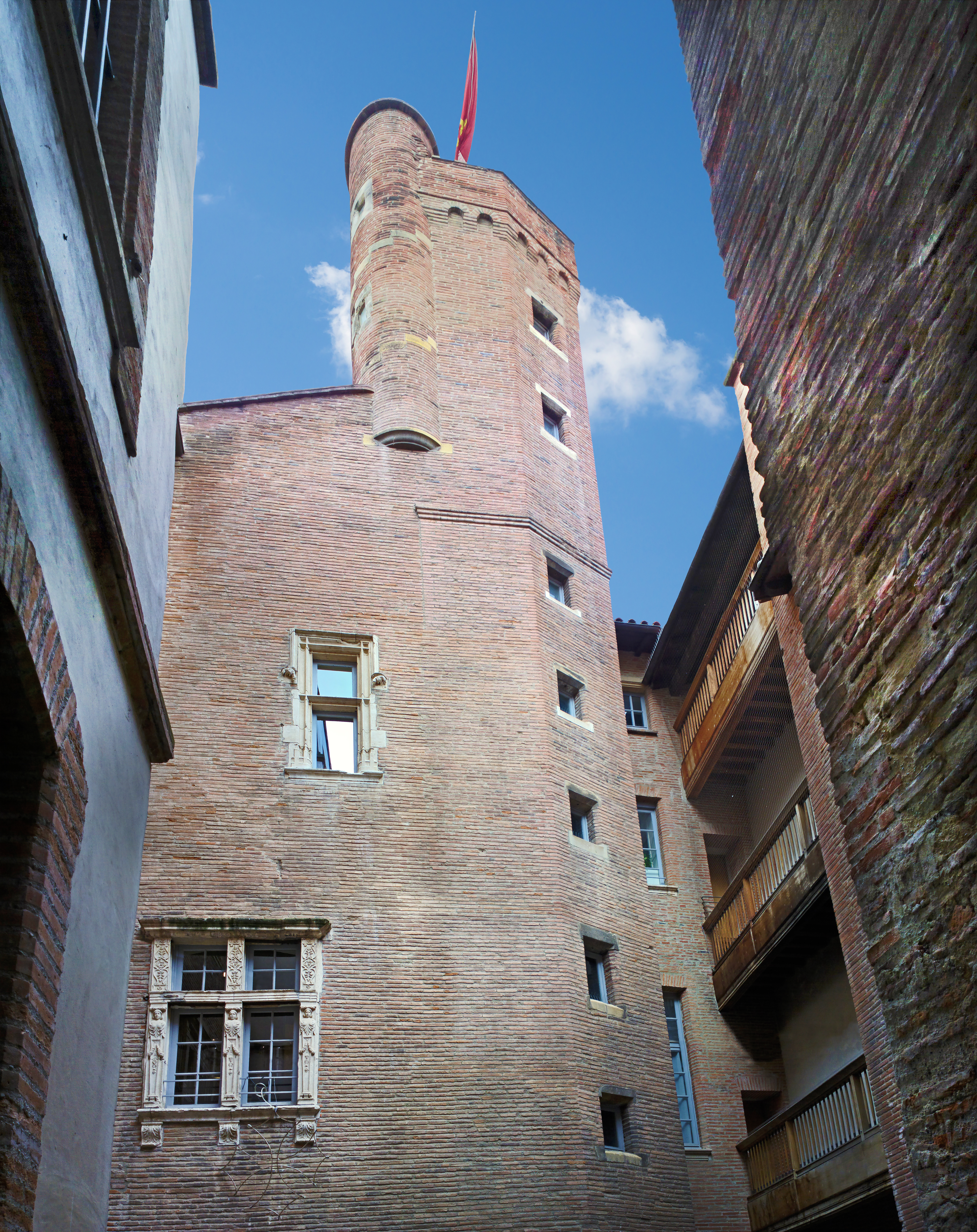
Gothic tower with Renaissance window.

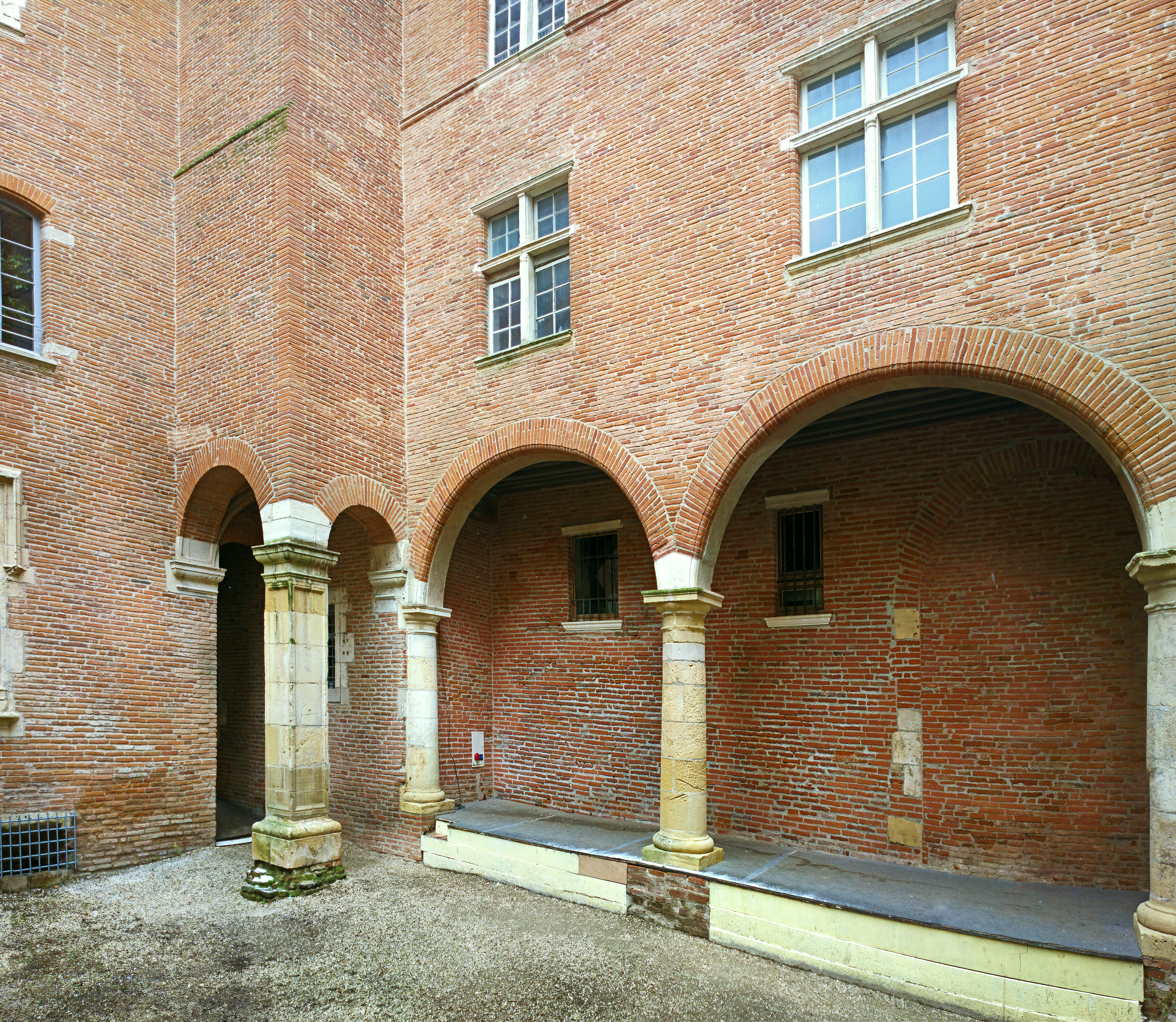
Arcaded gallery.

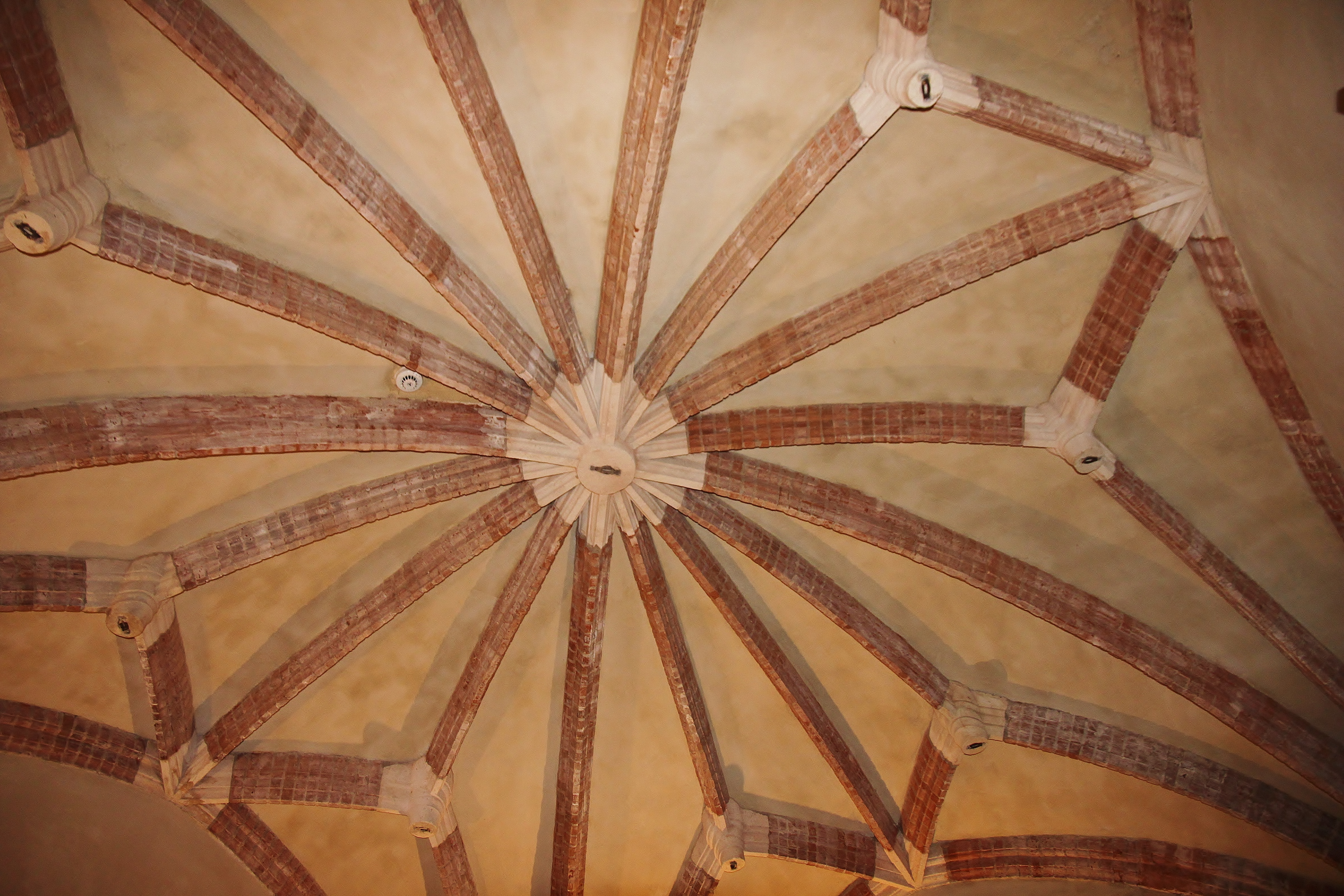
Vault.

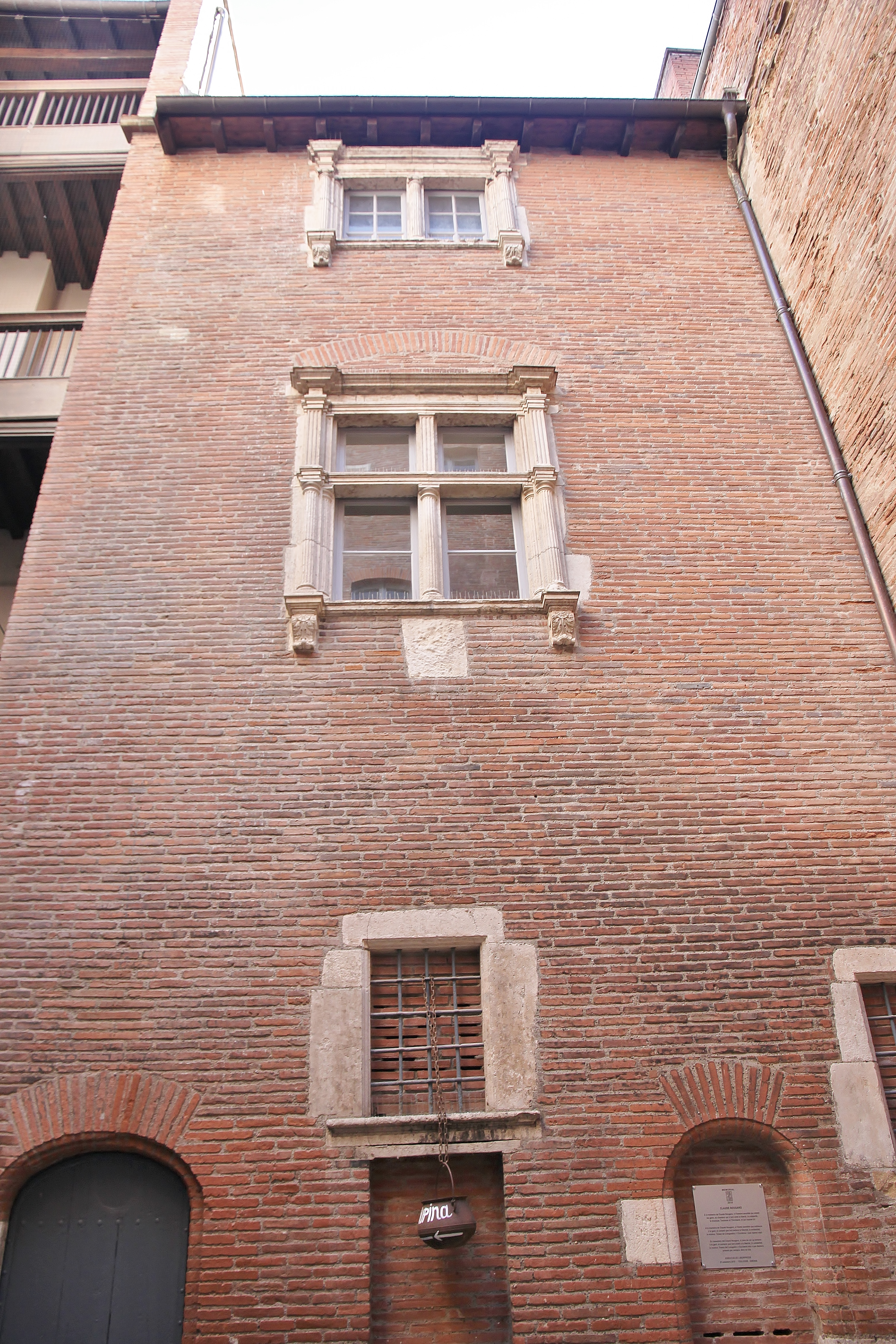
Renaissance windows.

==== Hôtel de Brucelles ====
Address: 19 rue des Changes.

In 1544, draper Arnaud de Brucelles (capitoul 1534–35) built his townhouse on a small plot in the heart of the merchants’ quarter. In the tiny court, a very tall stair-tower expresses the owner’s ambition. Each window, framed by colonnettes with classical capitals, is crowned by a stone bust representing a figure dressed à l’antique (cuirass, toga) or in 16th-century fashion. Other wings bear windows with fluted pilasters or columns, and formerly galleries whose balusters display the superposition of classical orders in reverse order (Corinthian, Ionic, Doric).

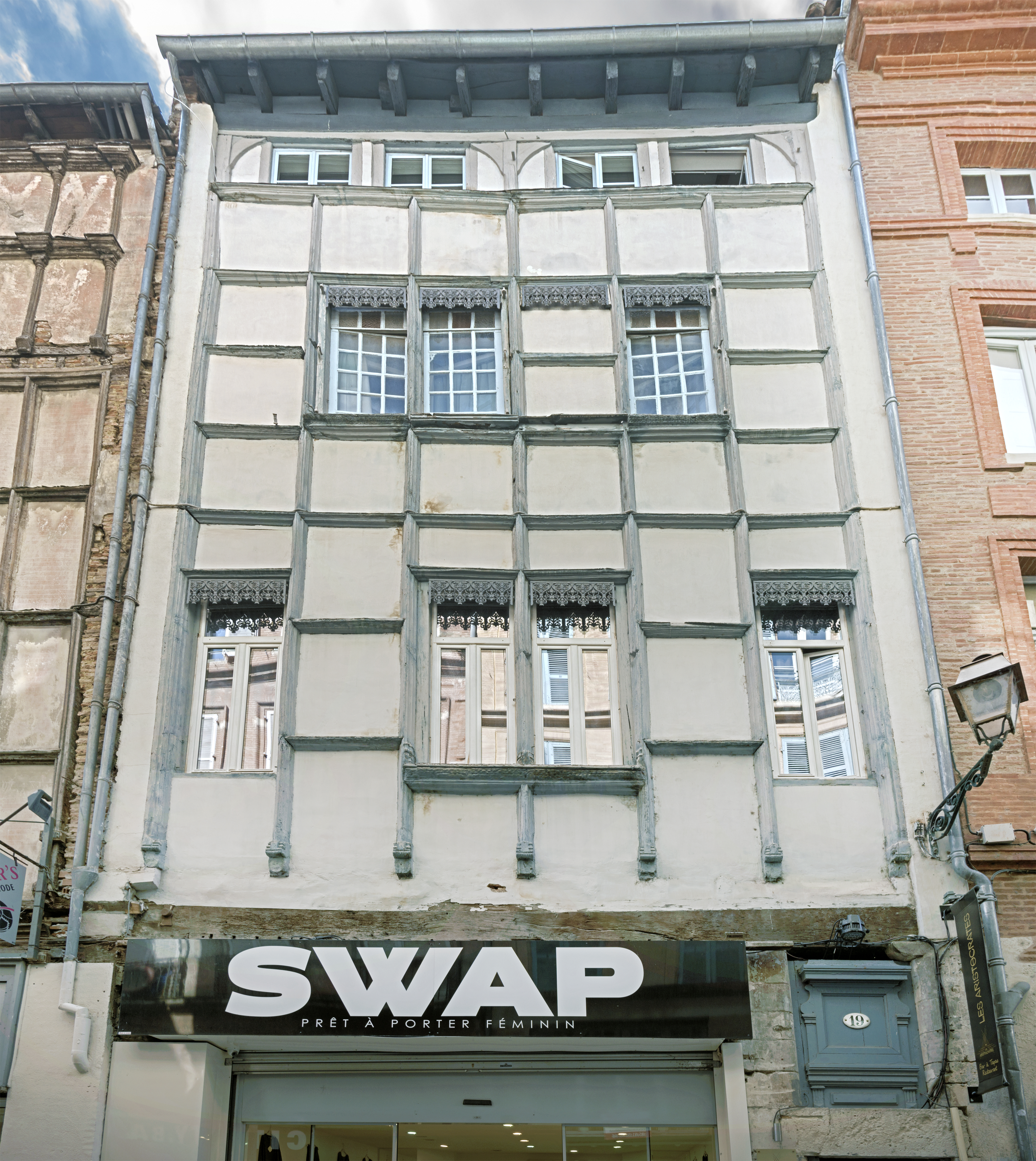
Street façade.

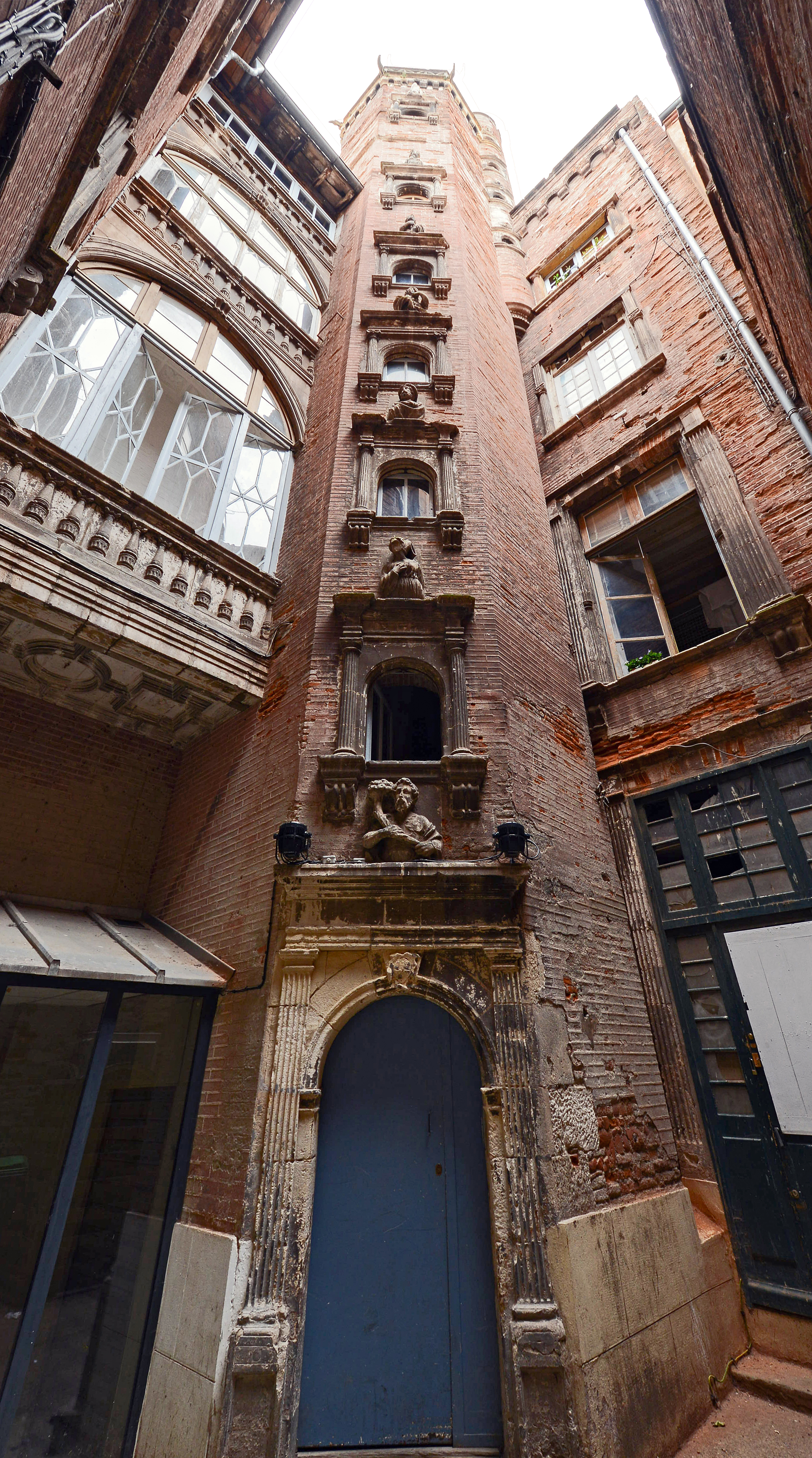
Court tower.

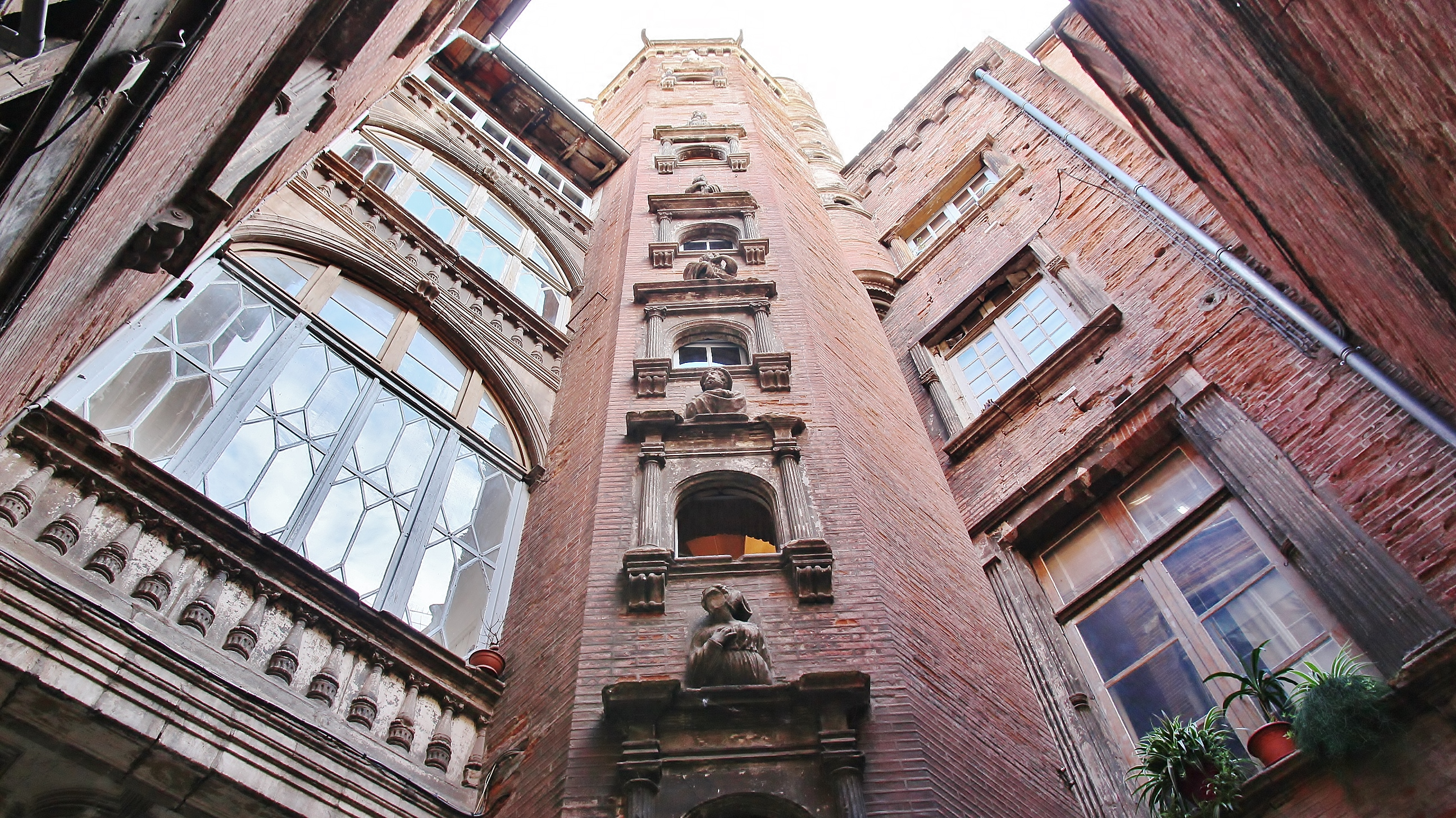
Detail.

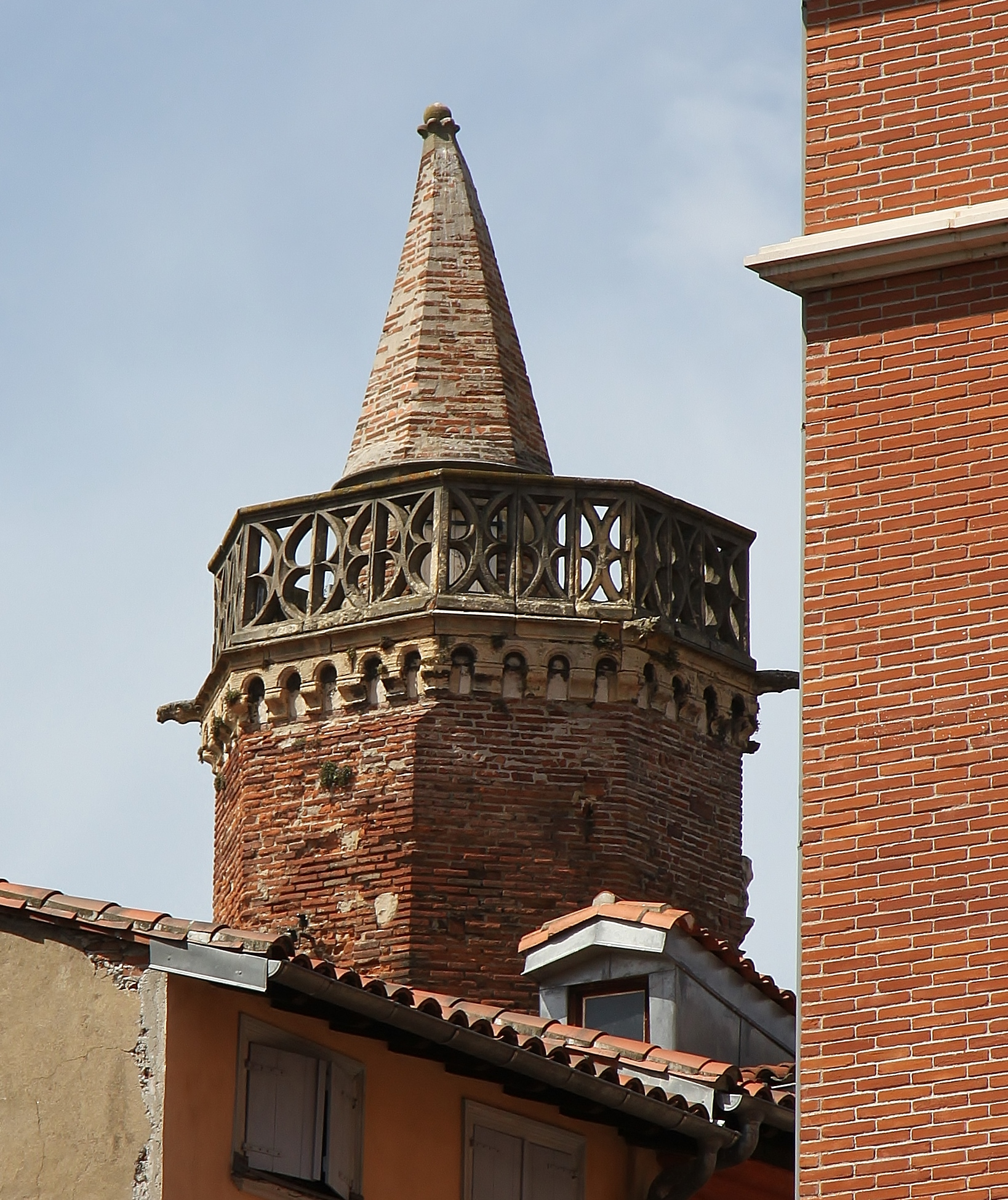
Top of the tower with balustrade and faux machicolations.

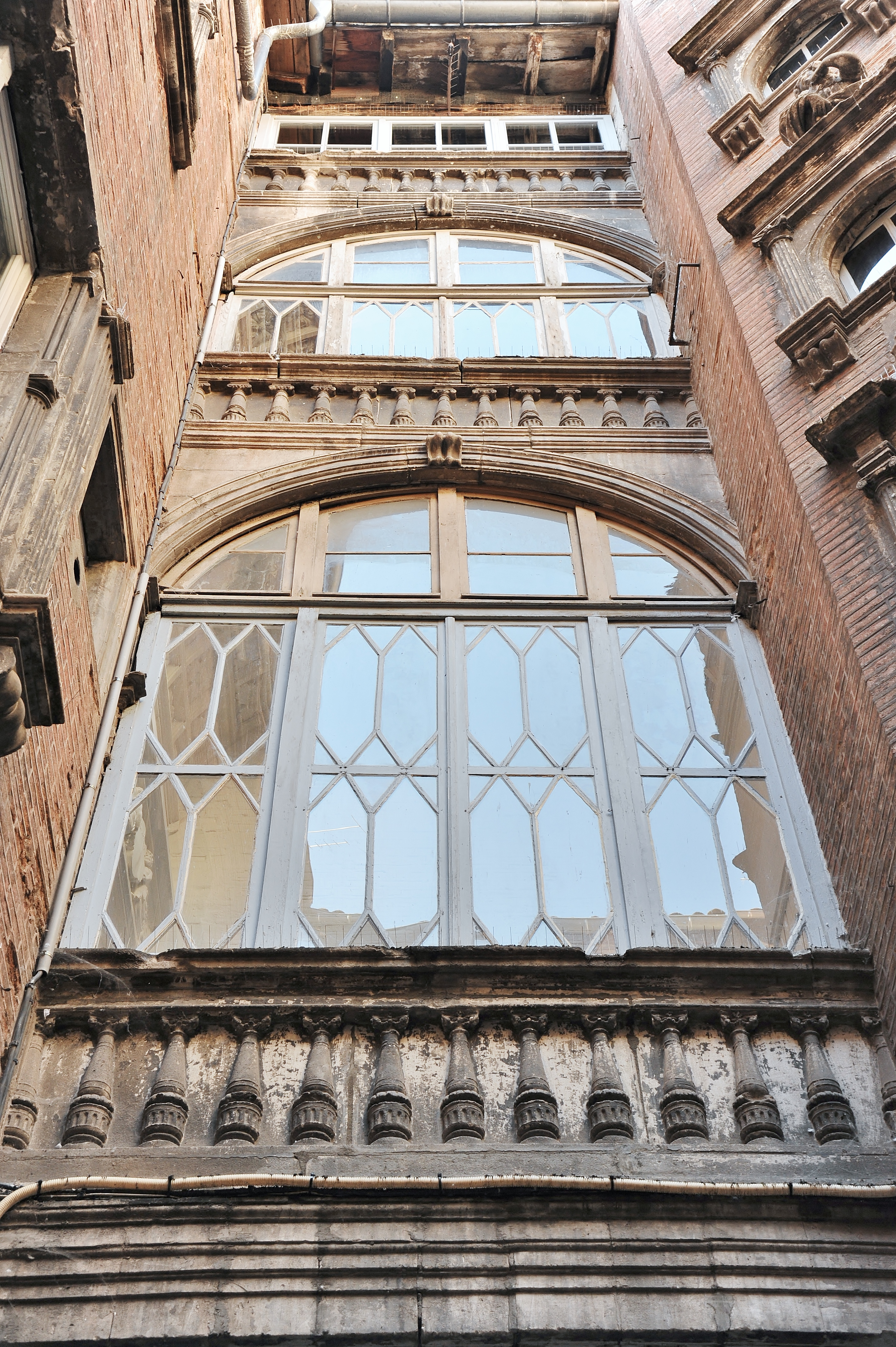
Former galleries.

==== Hôtel Dahus-Tournoer ====
Address: 9 rue Théodore-Ozenne.

After buying the Hôtel Dahus in 1528 (built c. 1460–1470), Guillaume de Tournoer, Second President of the Parlement, rebuilt the stair-tower c. 1532 in Renaissance style. He made the spiral stair, with its twisted central newel, the most spacious and beautiful of its kind in Toulouse. In memory of his recently deceased son, two fine confronting lions flank a funerary urn over the door framed by composite pilasters; higher up, putti hold a garland of plenty. A Latin motto surrounds a defaced coat of arms. The top of the tower and its turret were added only in the mid-17th century.

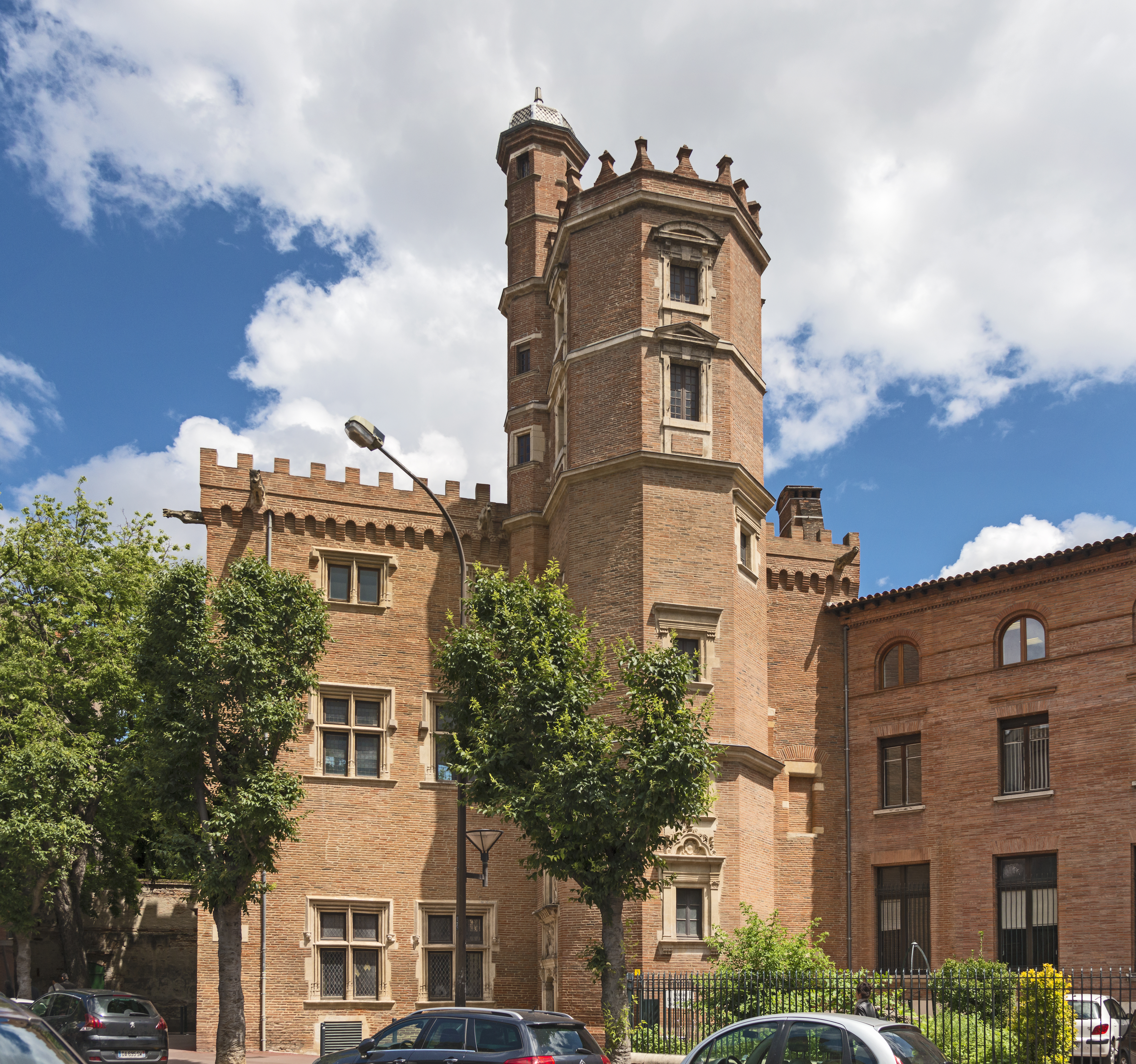
Hôtel Dahus-Tournoer.

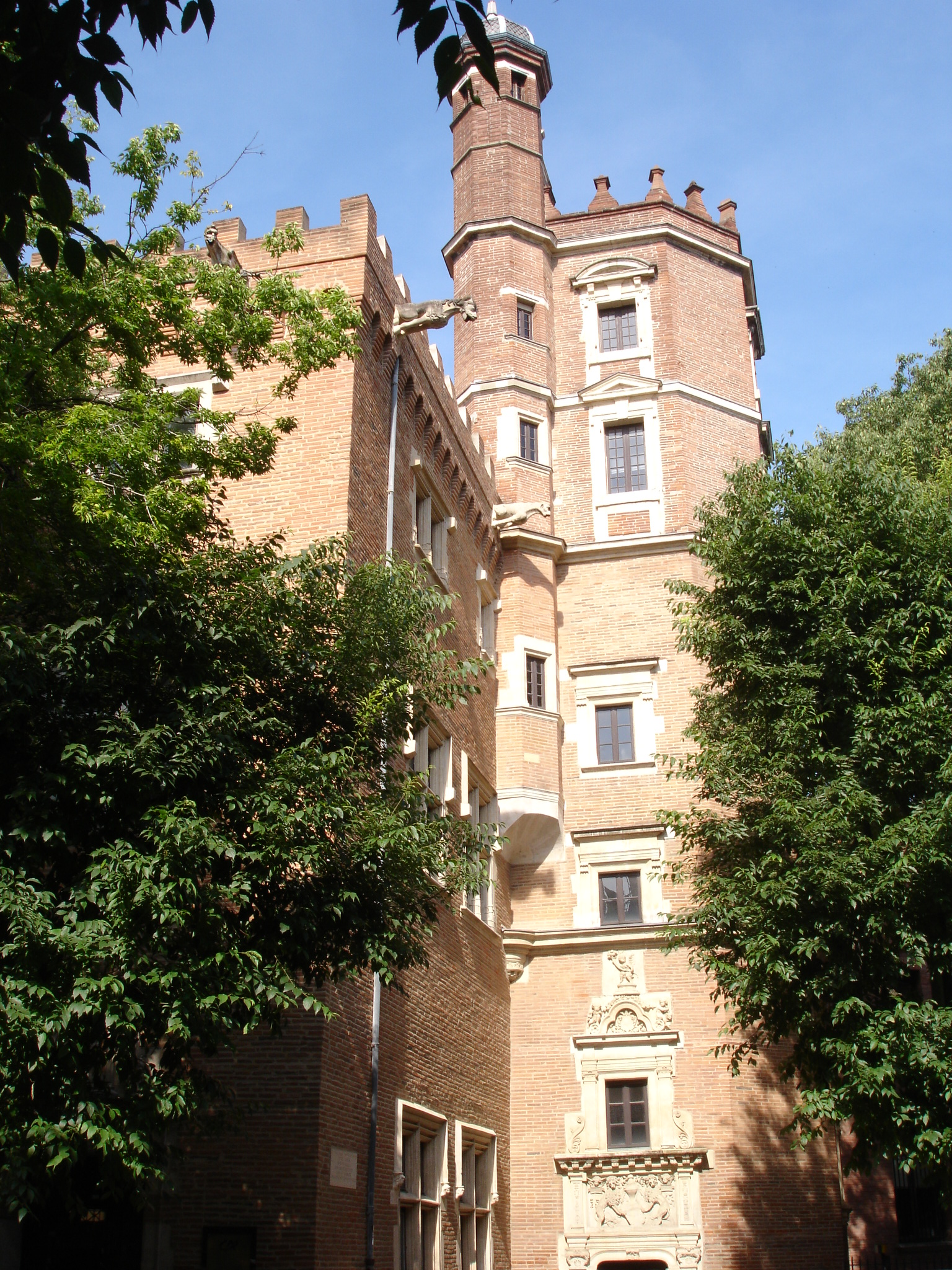
Tournoer tower.

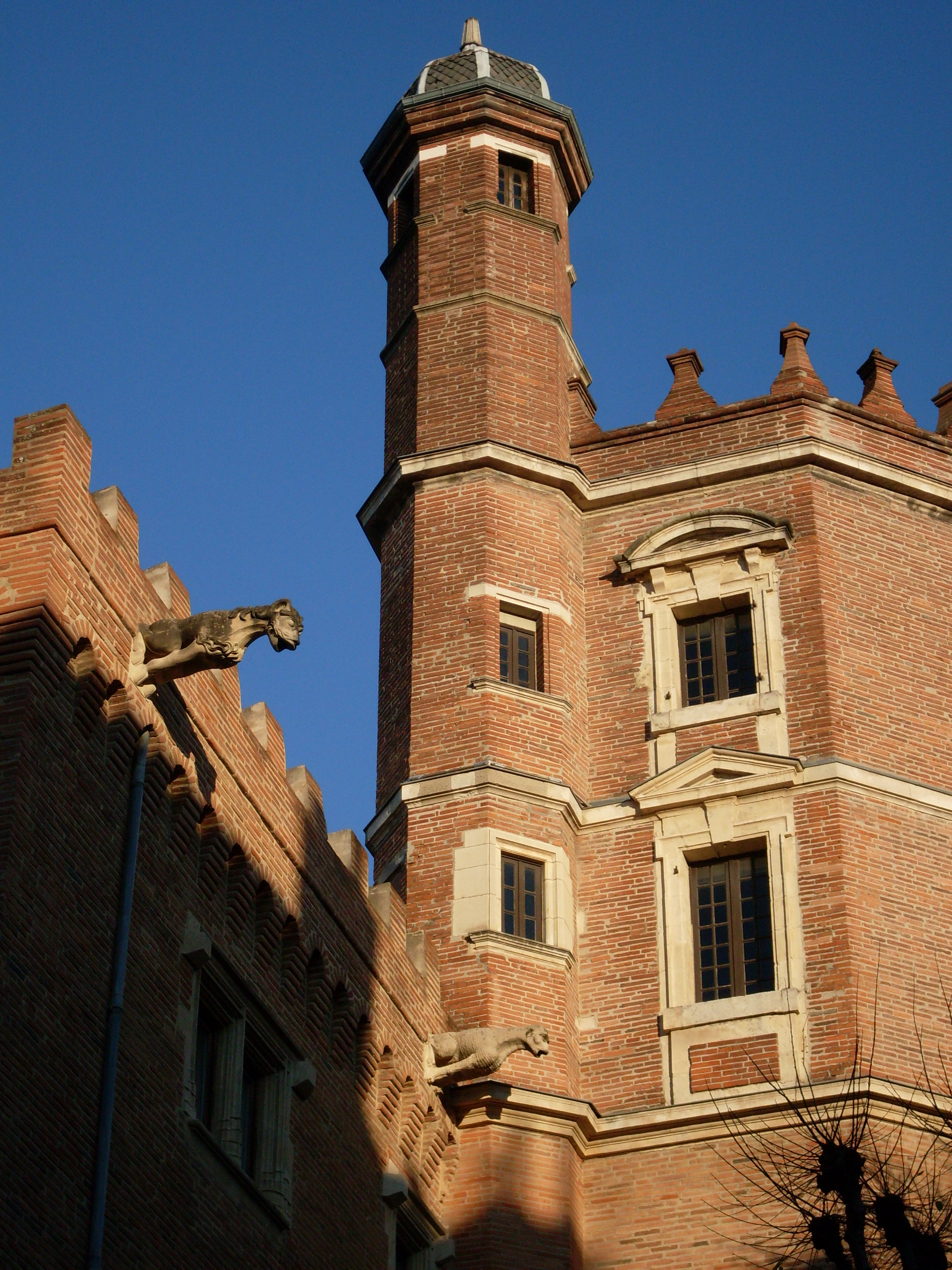
Top of the tower.

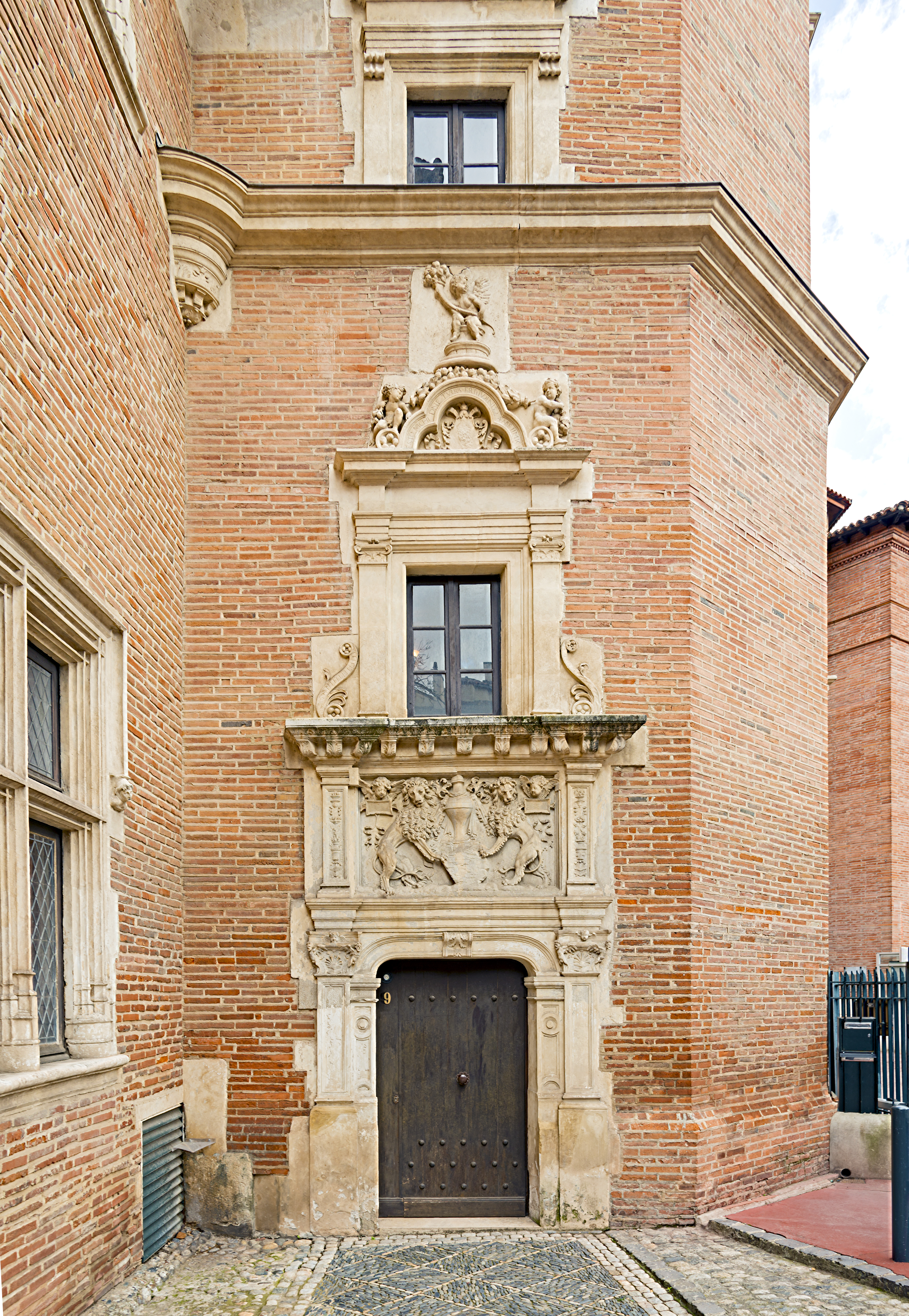
Base of the tower.

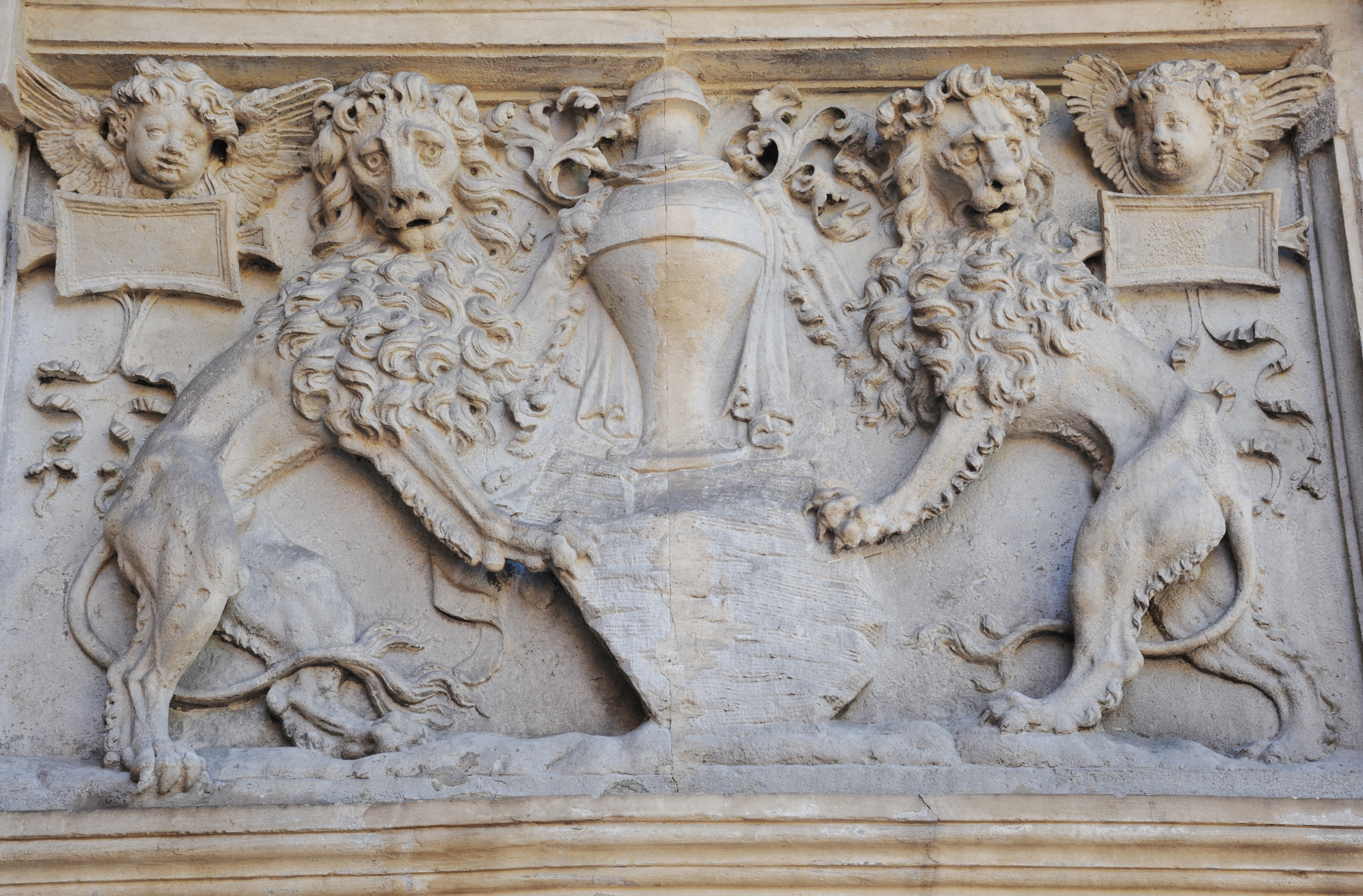
Lions flanking a funerary urn.

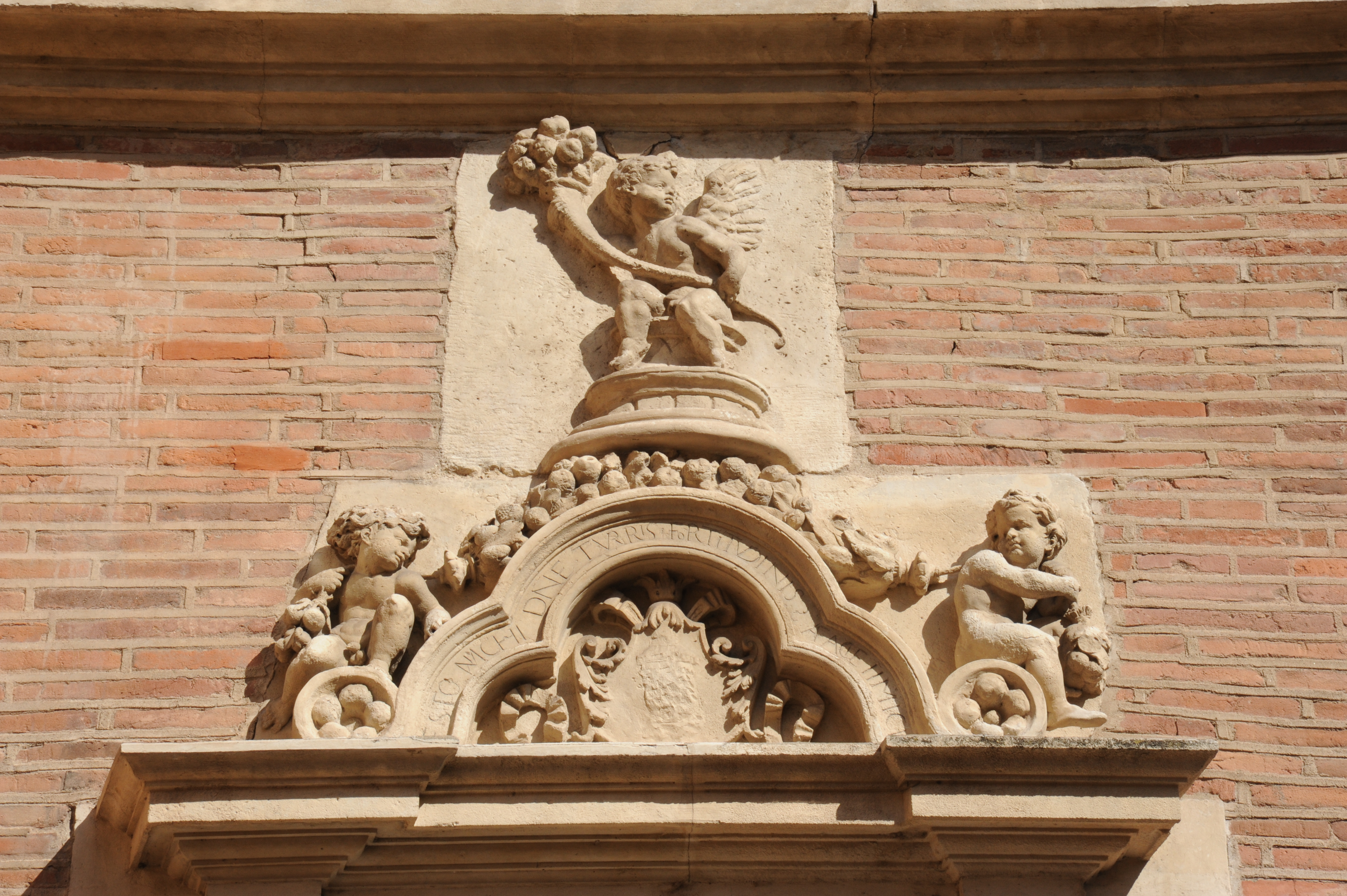
Putti and Latin motto.

==== Hôtel Delpech ====
Address: 20 rue des Changes.

In the court, a Gothic tower from the early 16th century by Pierre Delpech father stands alongside Renaissance windows dating 1554–1560 by Pierre Delpech son. Access to the tower is through a Renaissance door with a triangular pediment bearing the Christogram.

Enriched by the woad trade, the Delpech family was very influential: the father was capitoul in 1534, the son in 1554, 1555 and 1562. The latter zealously defended the Catholic cause during the French Wars of Religion. Brother-in-law of Pierre d'Assézat, he became a fierce adversary after Assézat’s conversion to Protestantism. Latin biblical quotations on each of the court’s eight Renaissance windows illustrate his Ligueur commitment.

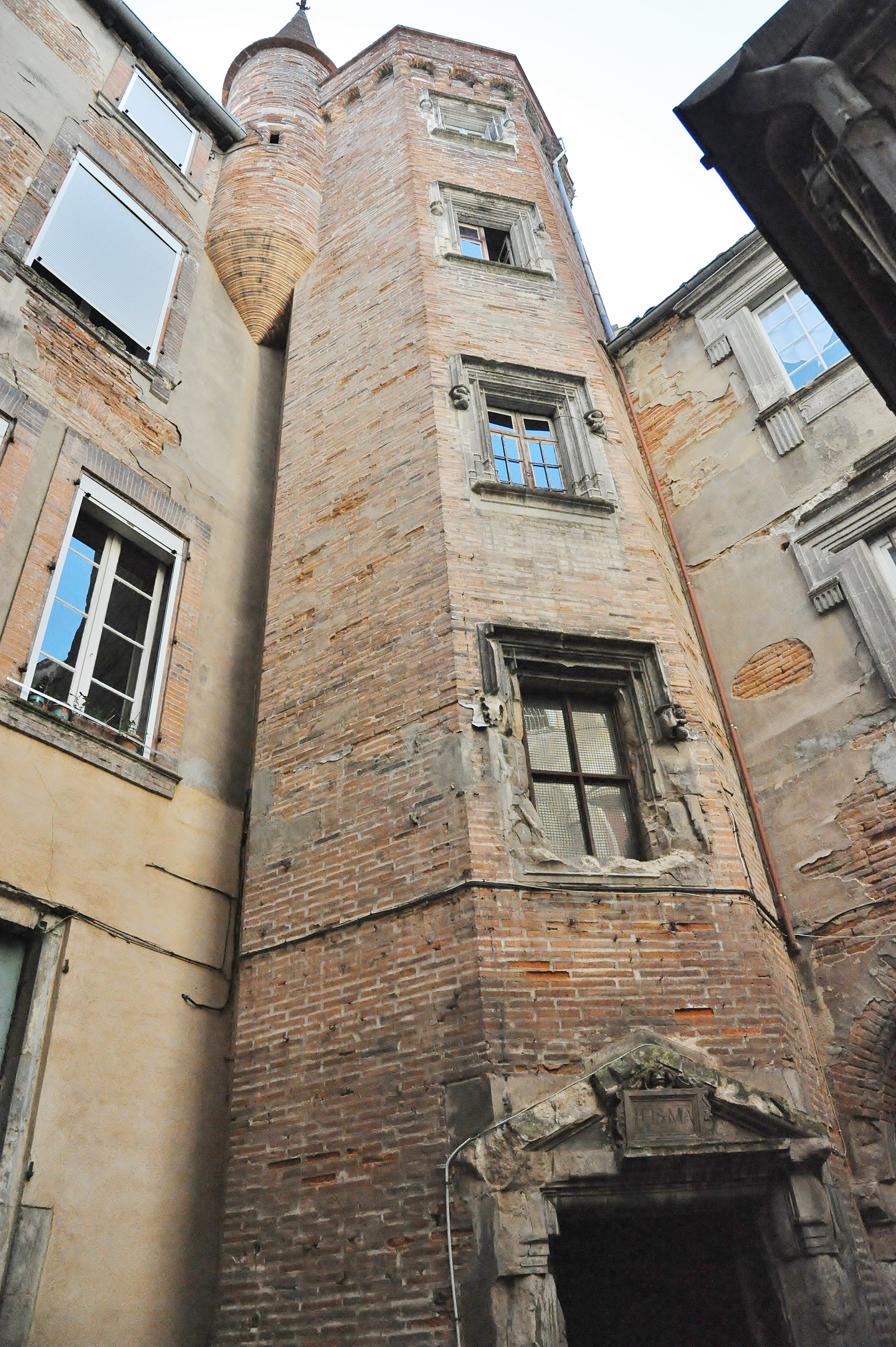
Gothic tower with Renaissance door.

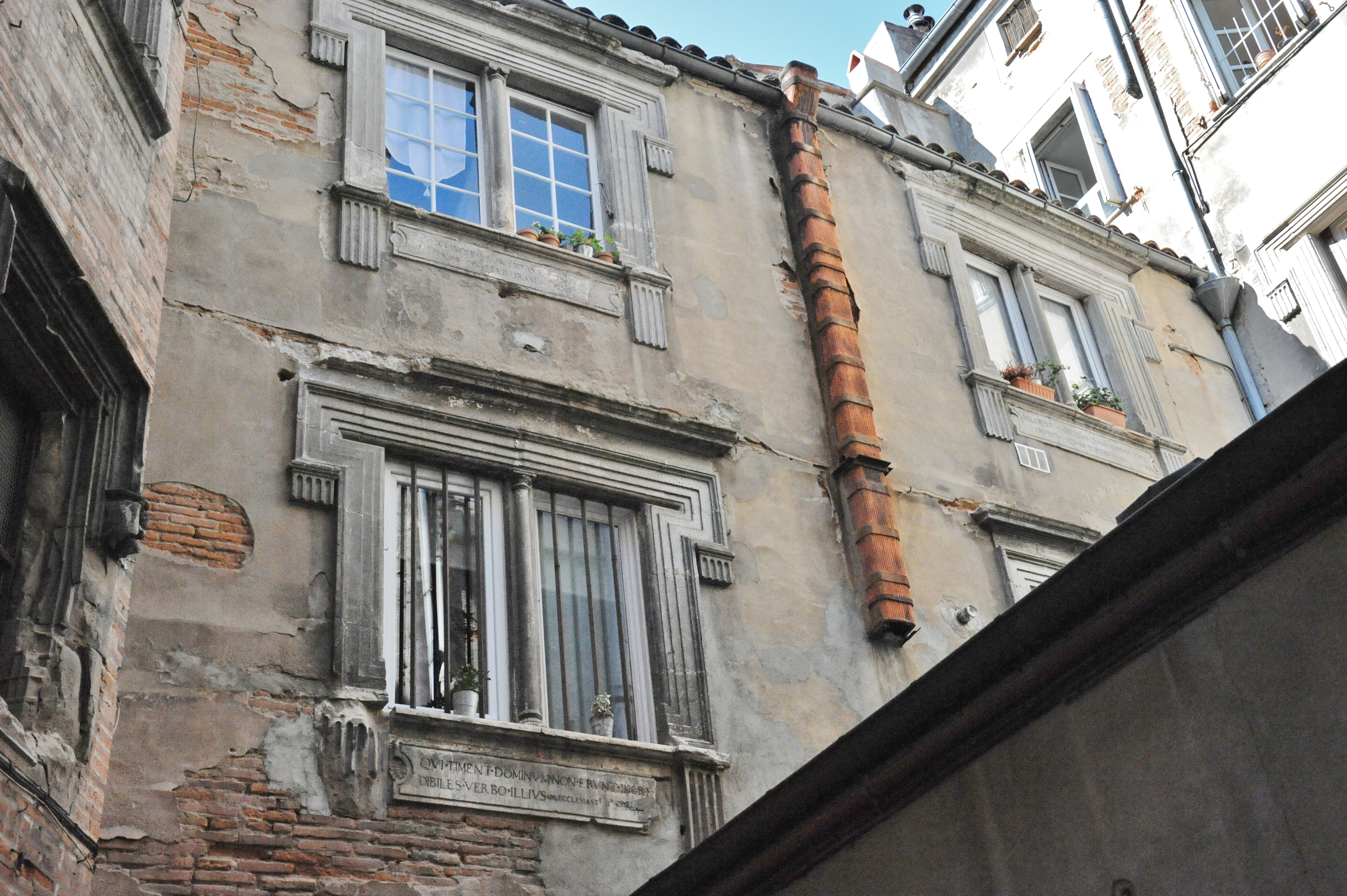
South façade.

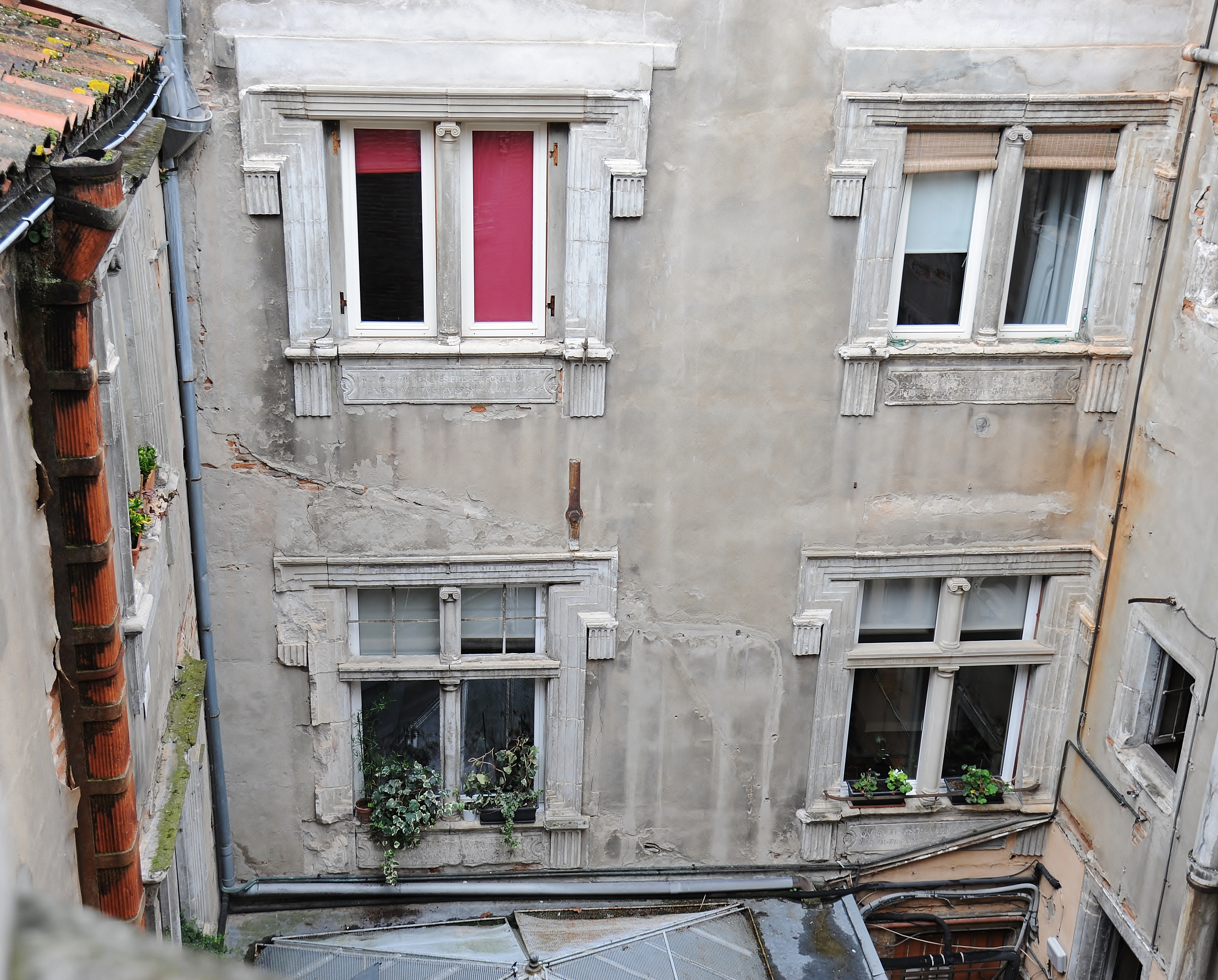
West façade.

==== Hôtel Dumay ====
Address: 7 rue du May.

Between 1580 and 1600, physician Antoine Dumay built his townhouse. In the square court, two stair-towers serve the four wings. Renaissance windows, panels and polychrome Pyrenean marble cabochons decorate the façades, one of which has a gallery and supporting arcades.

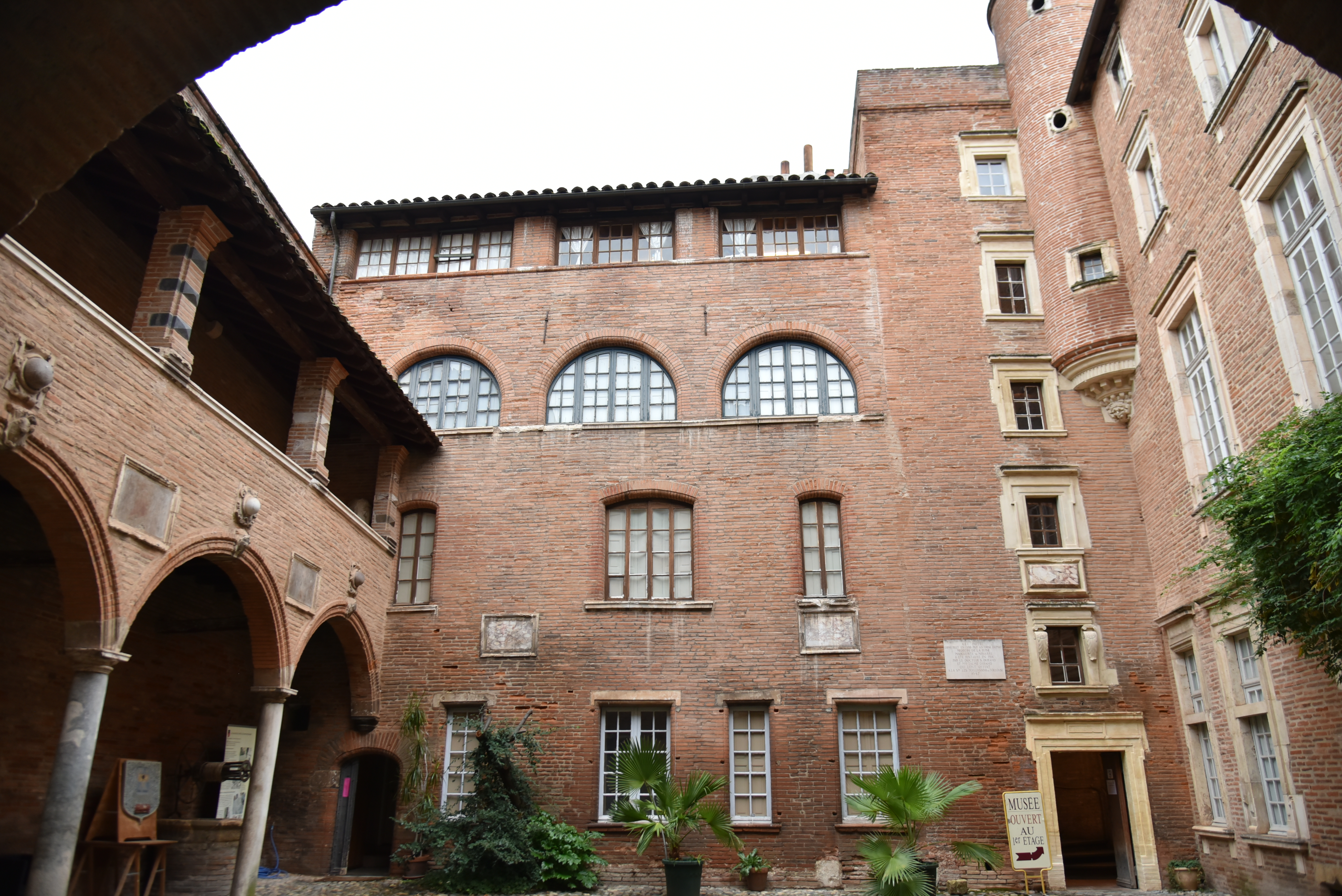
Hôtel Dumay.

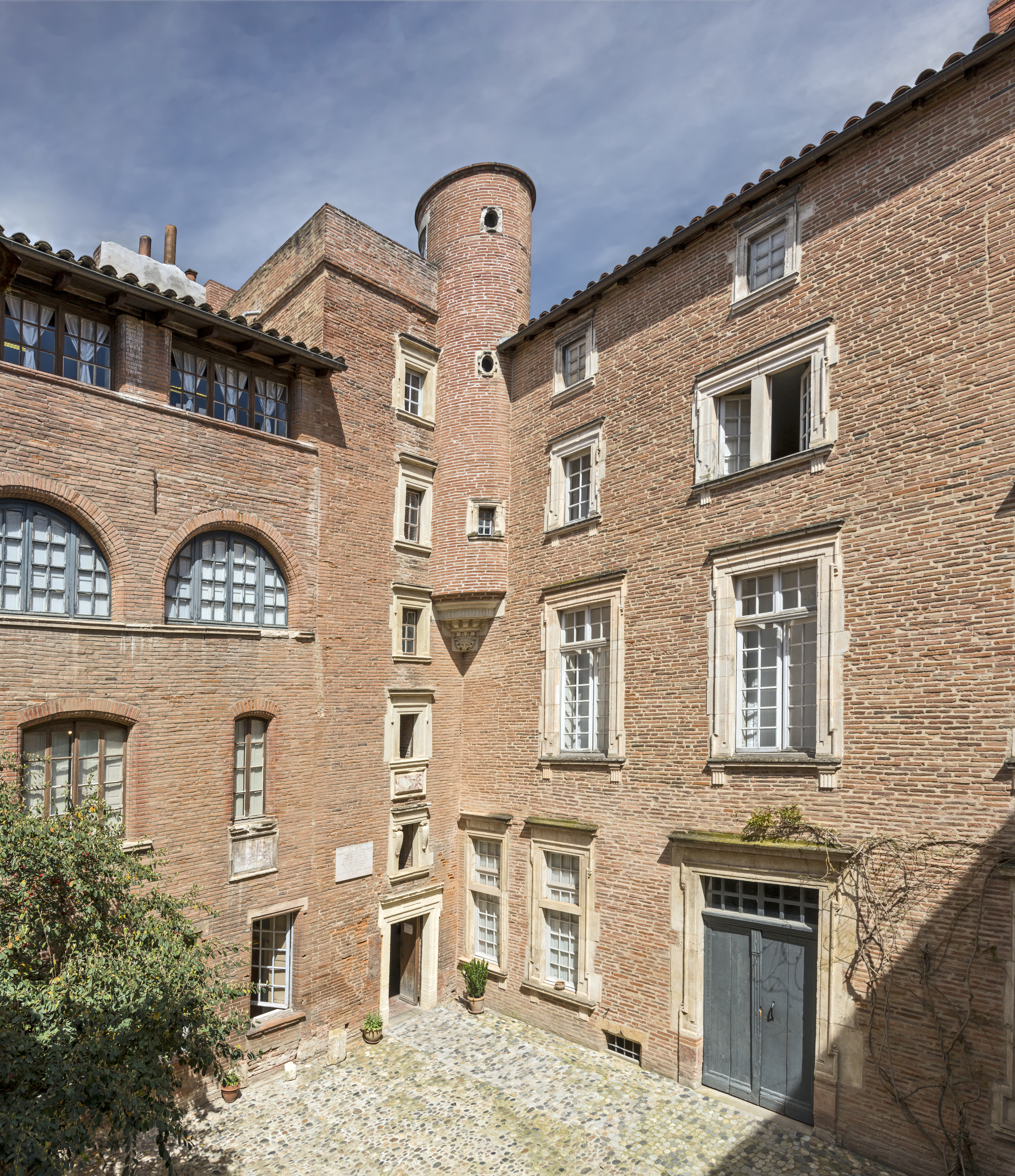
Court and entrance to the Old Toulouse Museum.

East façade.

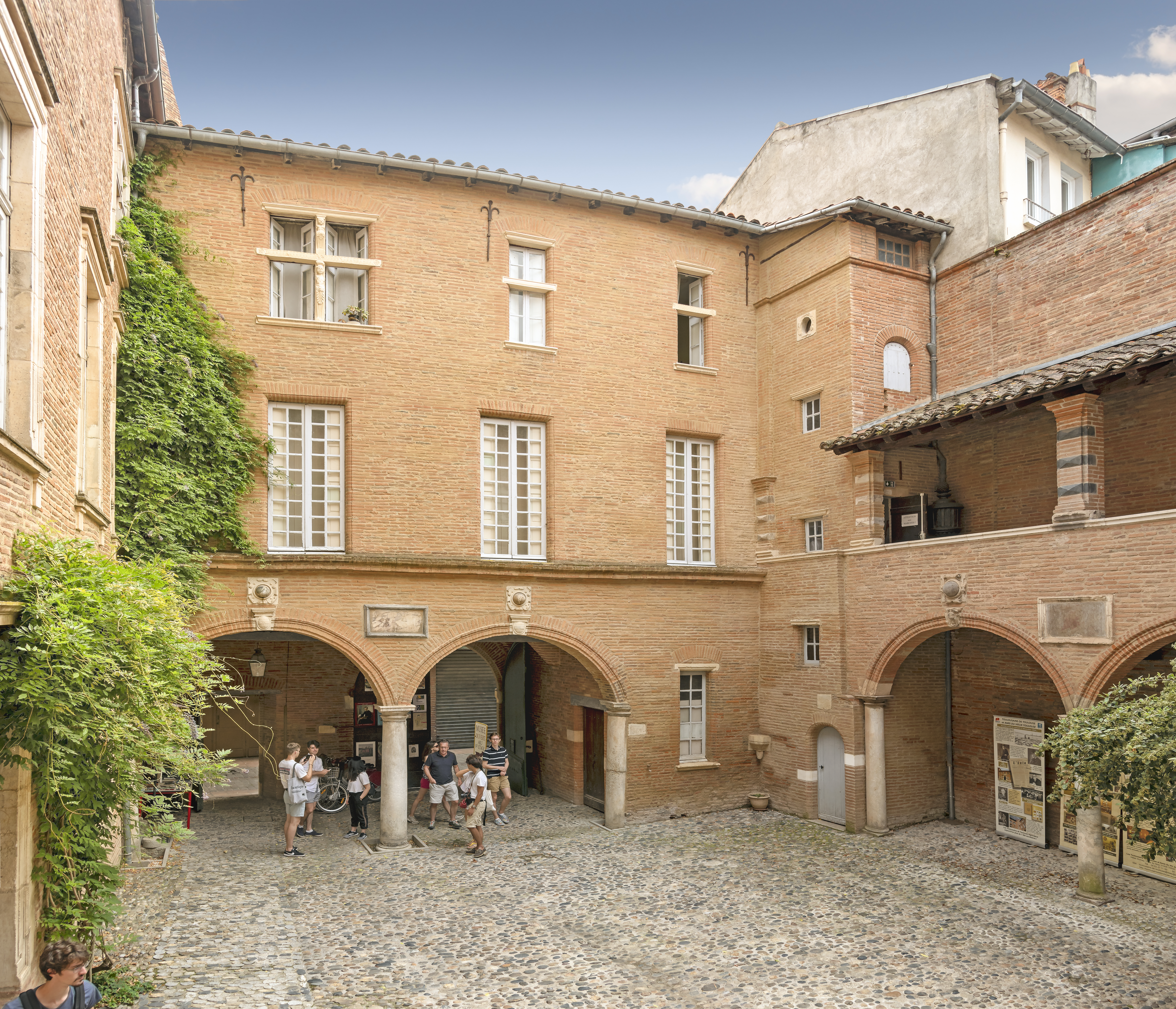
South façade.

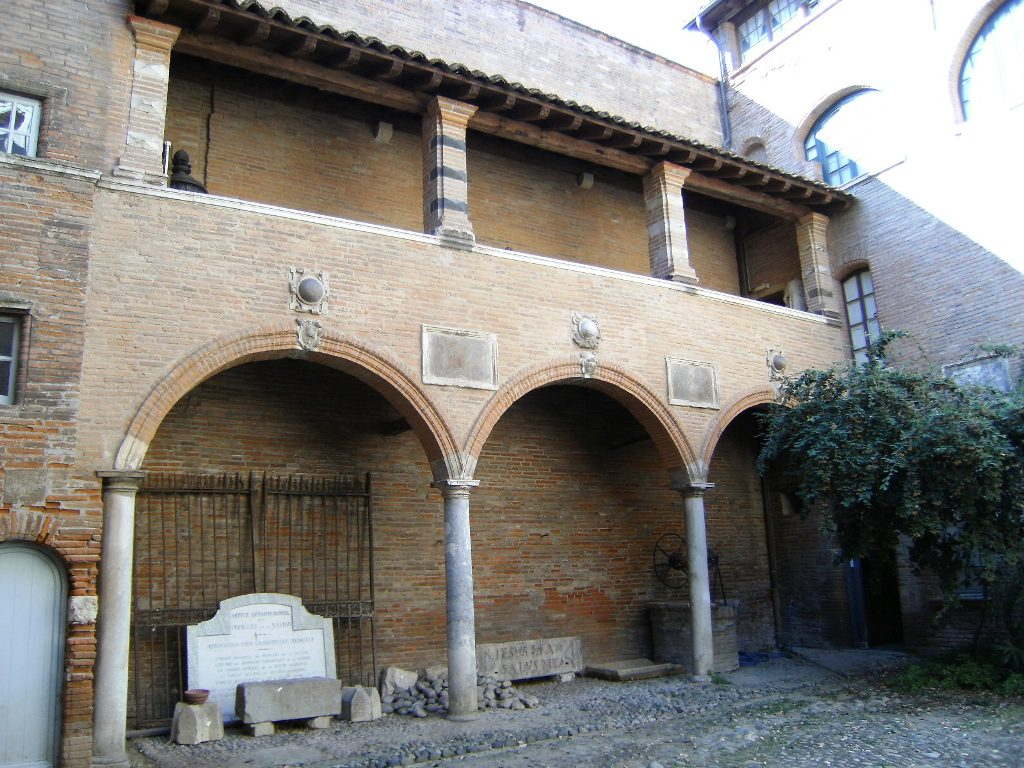
Court portico.

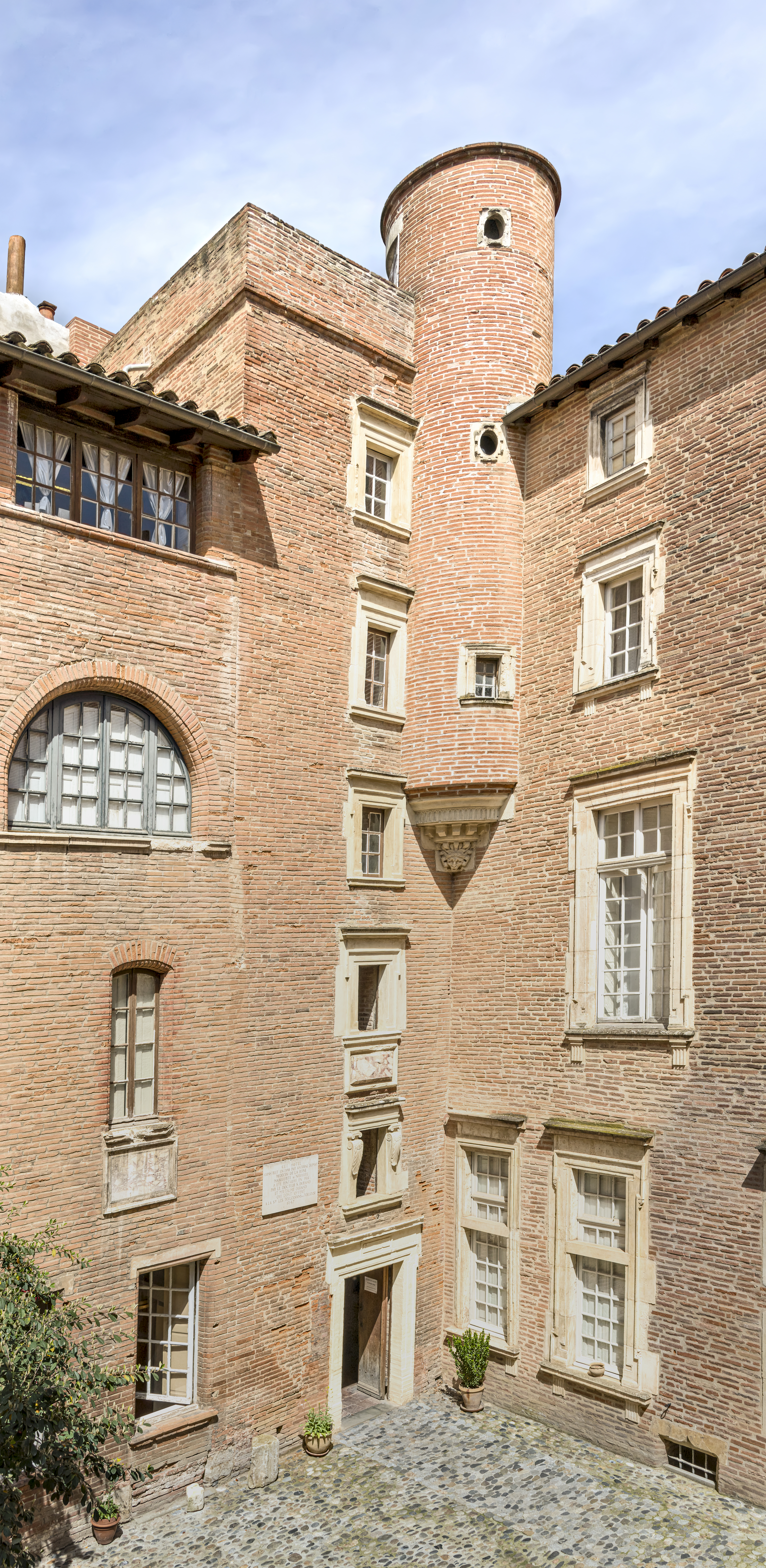
Stair-tower and turret.

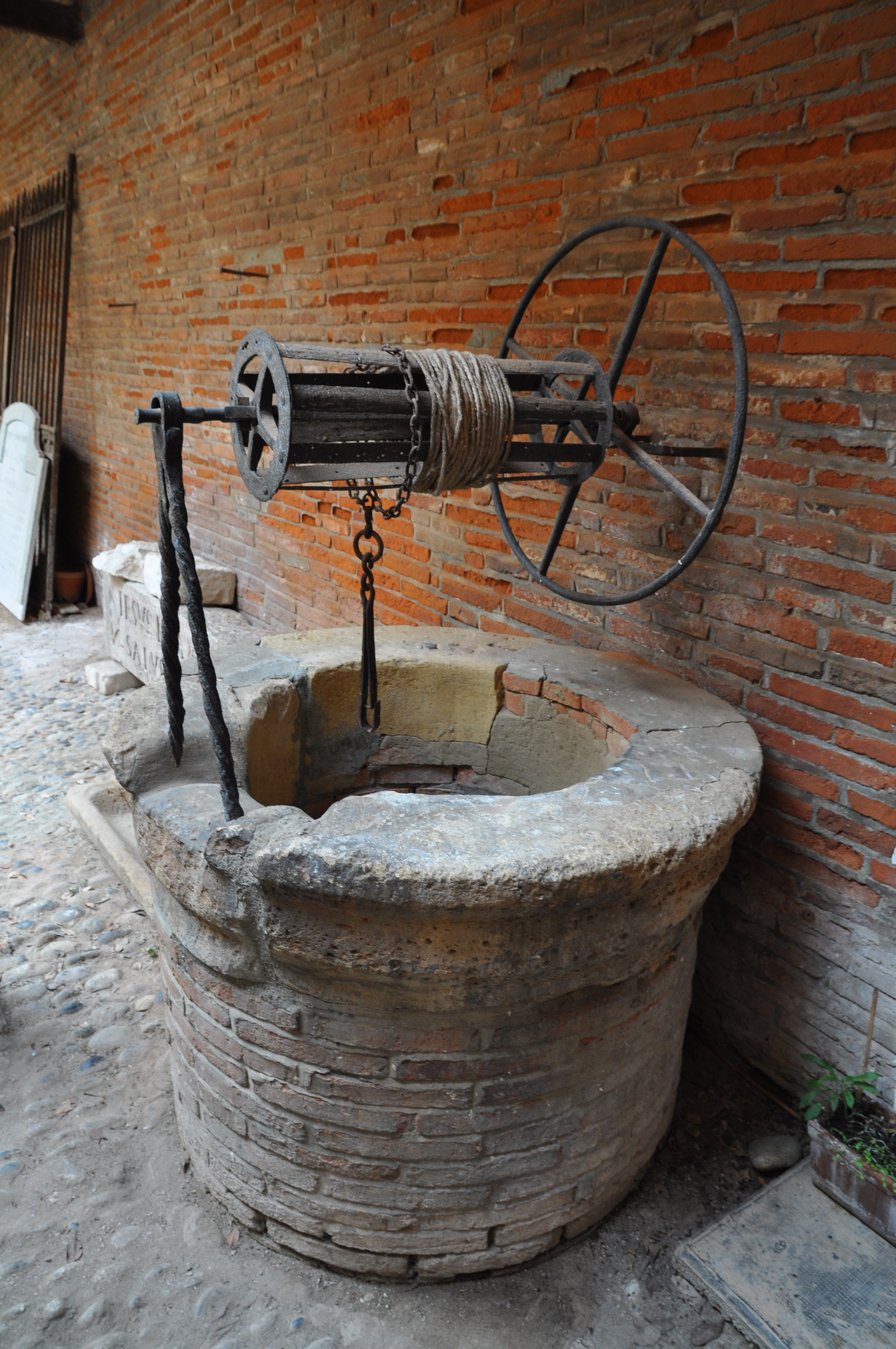
Well.

==== House of Auger Ferrier ====
Address: 39 rue Saint-Rome.

Of the house built by physician Auger Ferrier in 1553, the court—now an elevated terrace—retains a brick façade with fine stone windows. The sculpted décor features cut leather straps, garlands of abundance, masks, and heads of Native Americans.

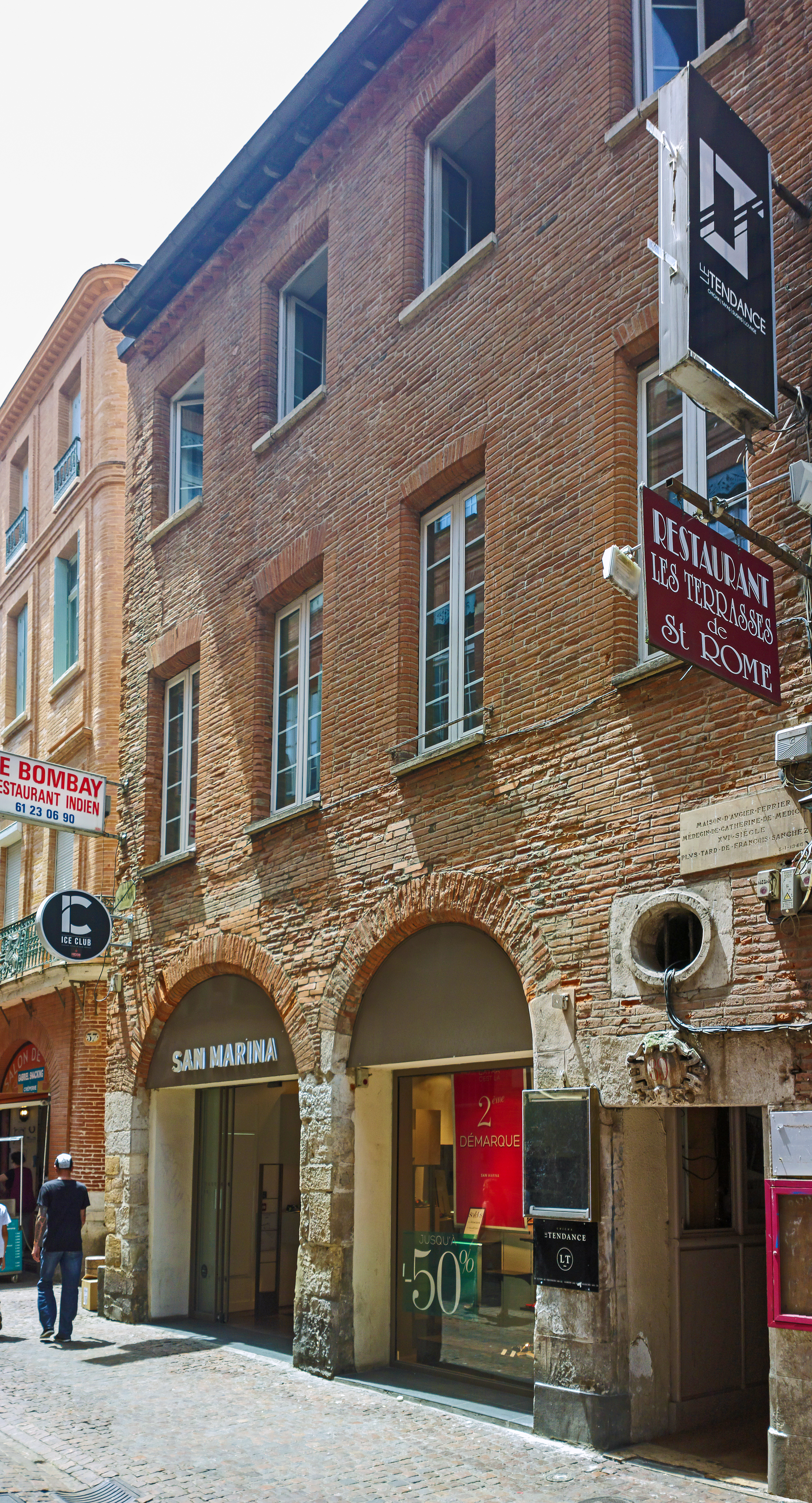
Street façade.

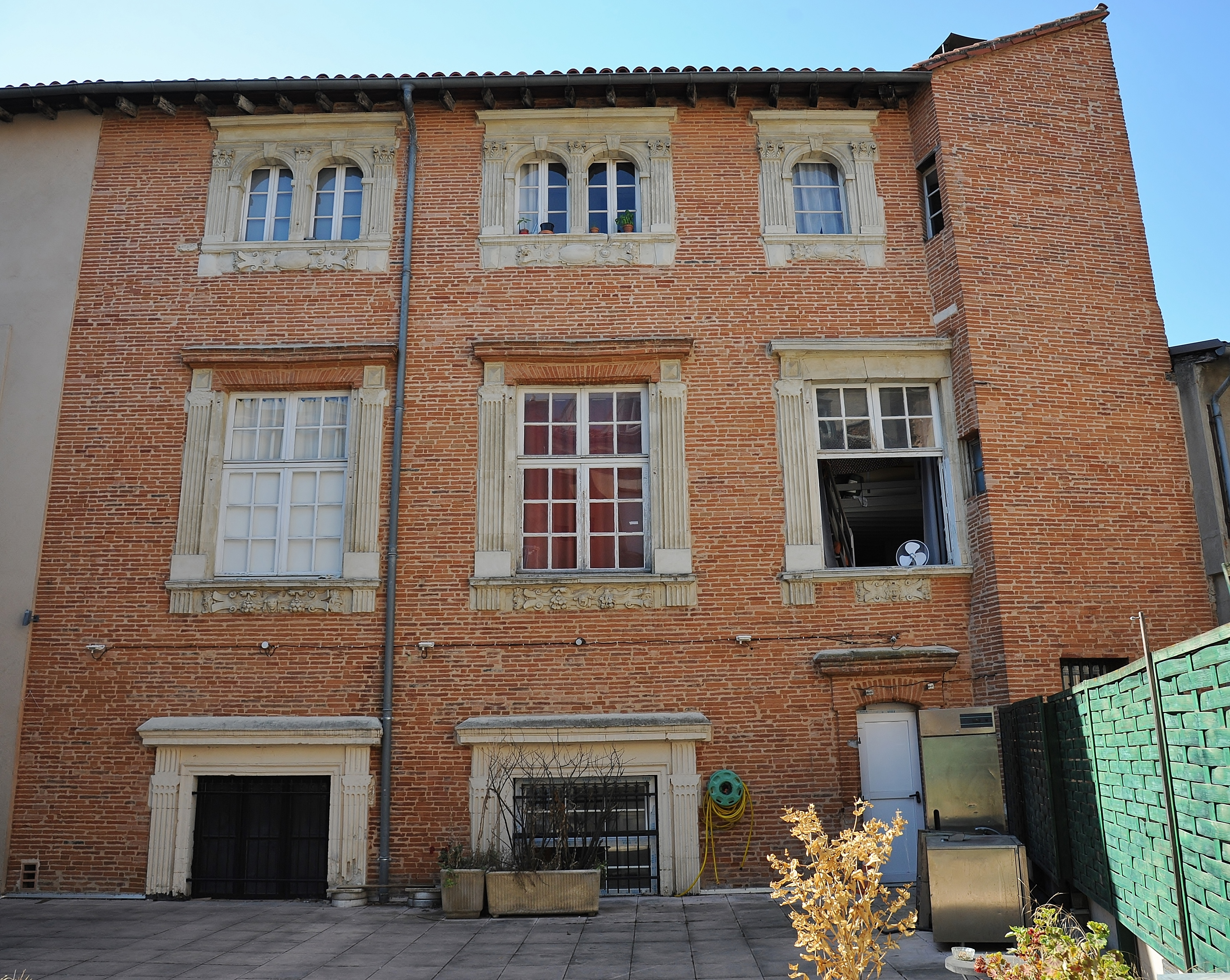
Court façade.

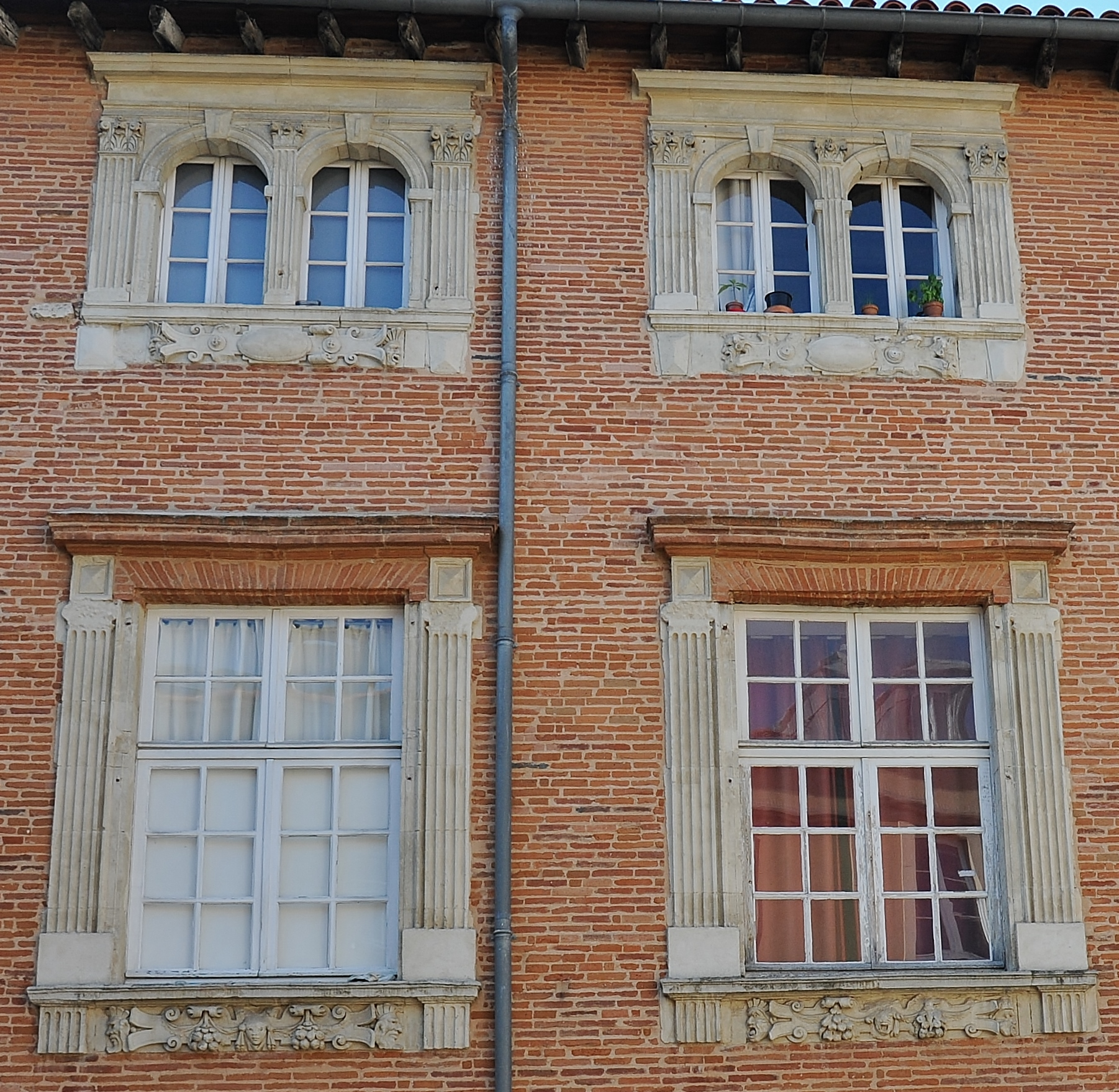
Windows.

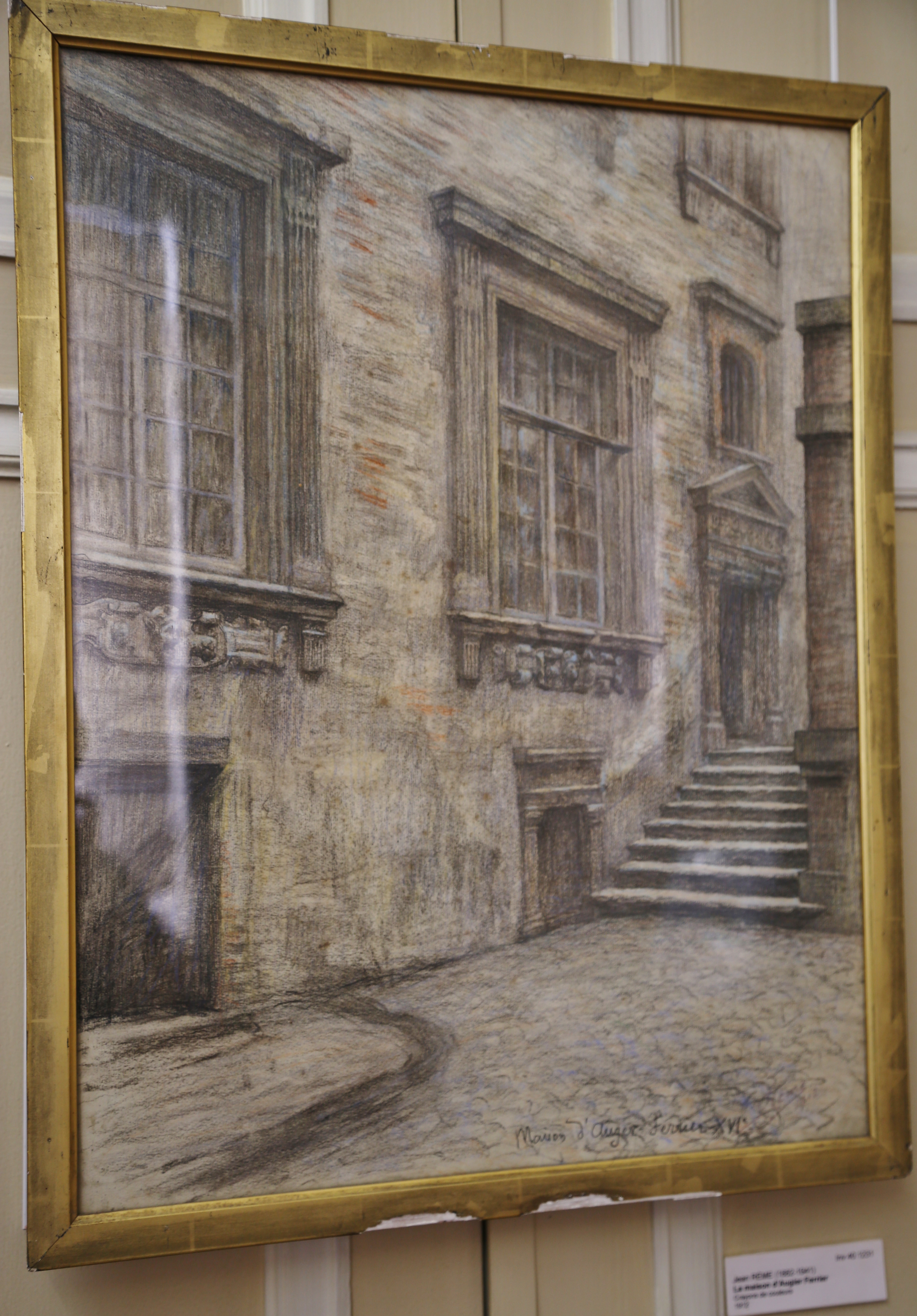
1912 drawing of the façade with door.

==== Hôtel de La Mamye ====
Address: 31 rue de la Dalbade.

Guillaume de Lamamye, Parlement counselor, built his townhouse in the 1540s. In the court he erected a gallery façade with the three superposed classical orders. For the first time in Toulouse, large columns with Doric, Ionic then Corinthian capitals succeed level by level. The hexagonal brick stair-tower is crowned with faux machicolations and gargoyles and adorned with a scallop shell.

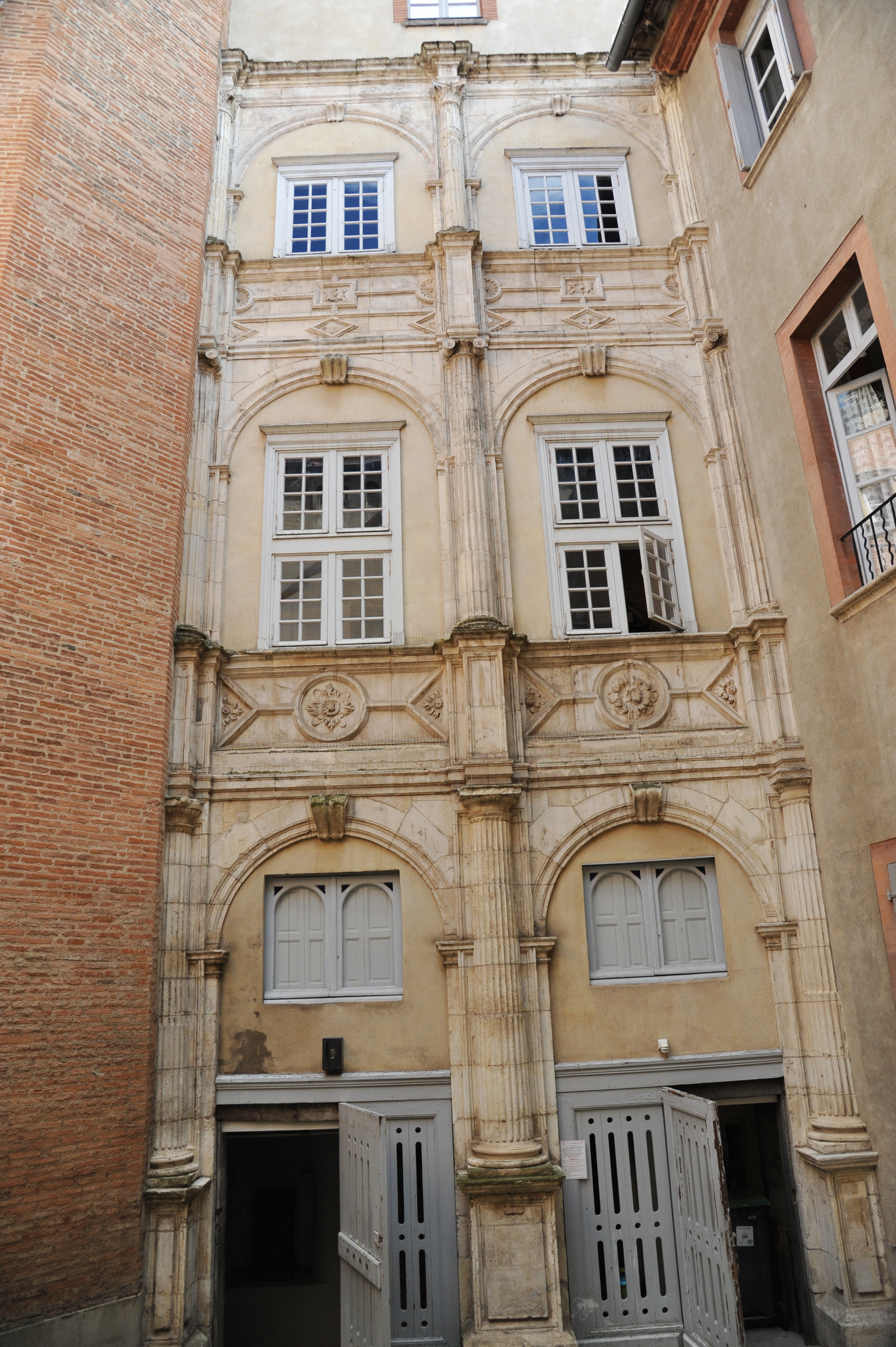
Court galleries.

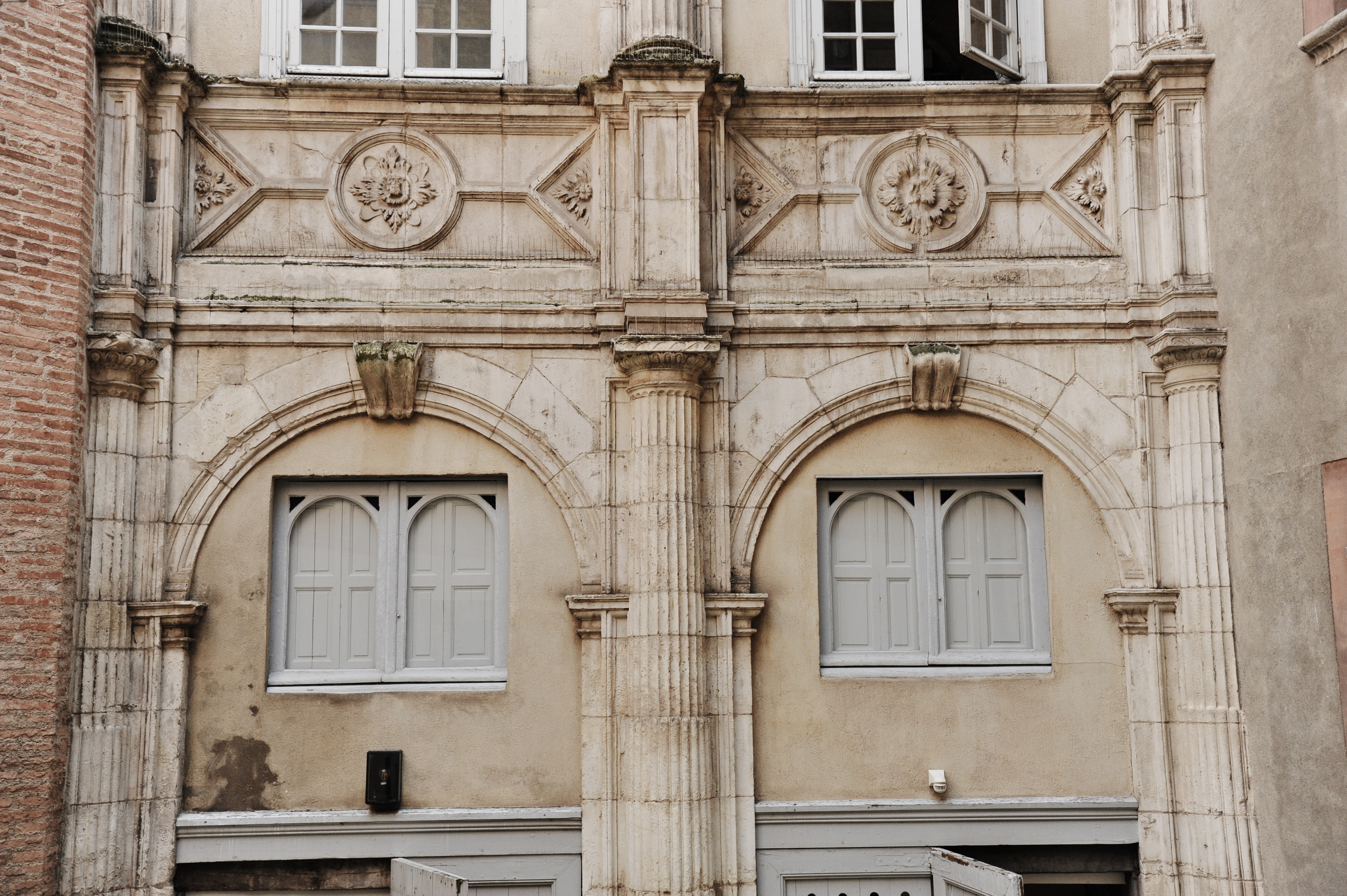
Arcades later walled up.

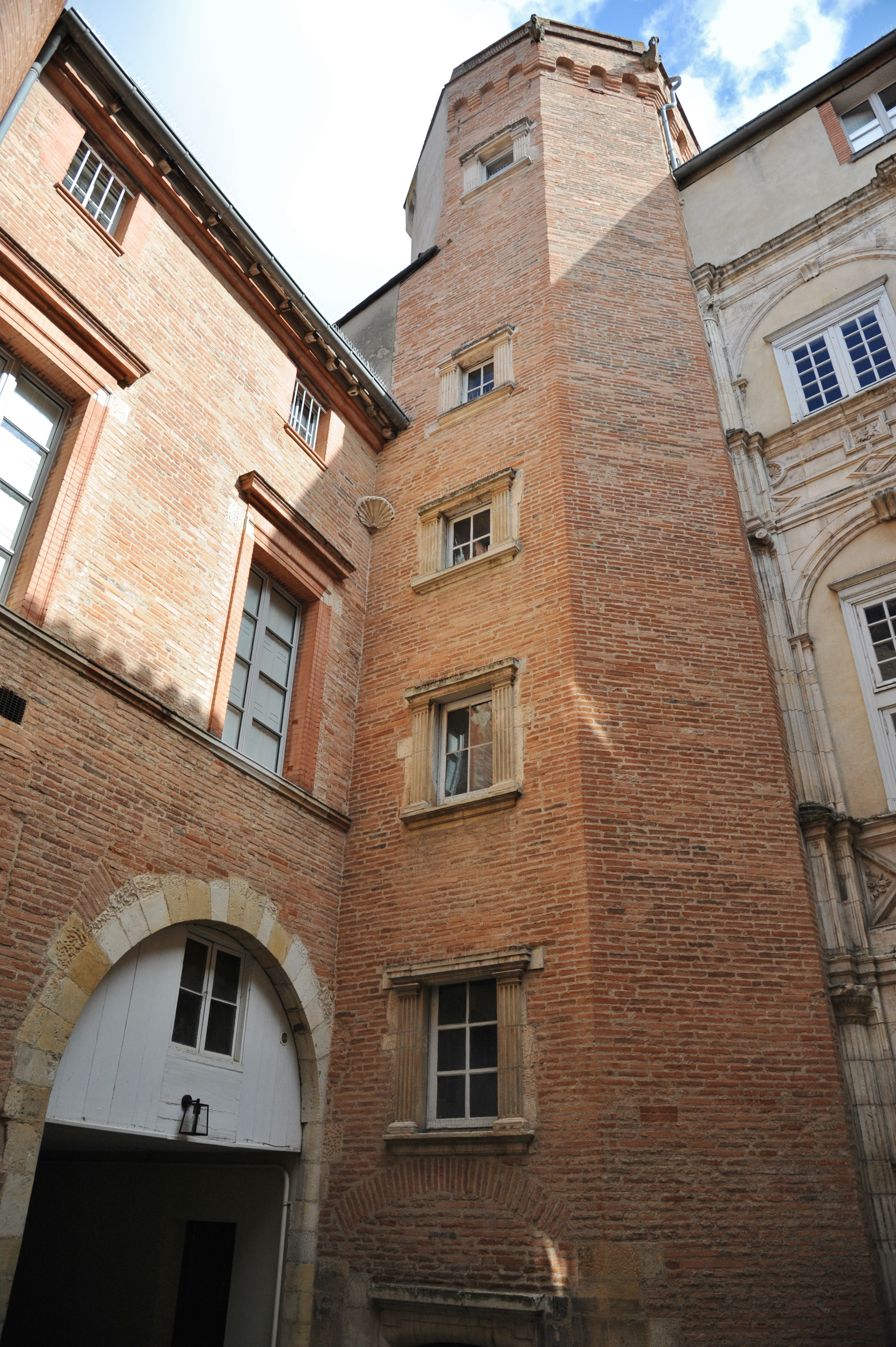
Stair-tower.

==== Hôtel Lagorrée ====
Address: 34 rue Peyrolières.

Although the façade and court were rebuilt in the 19th century, the Renaissance character survives in two twin portals from the late 16th (right) and early 17th century (left), decorated with crescents of Diana supporting the Languedoc cross on the left and a globus cruciger on the right.

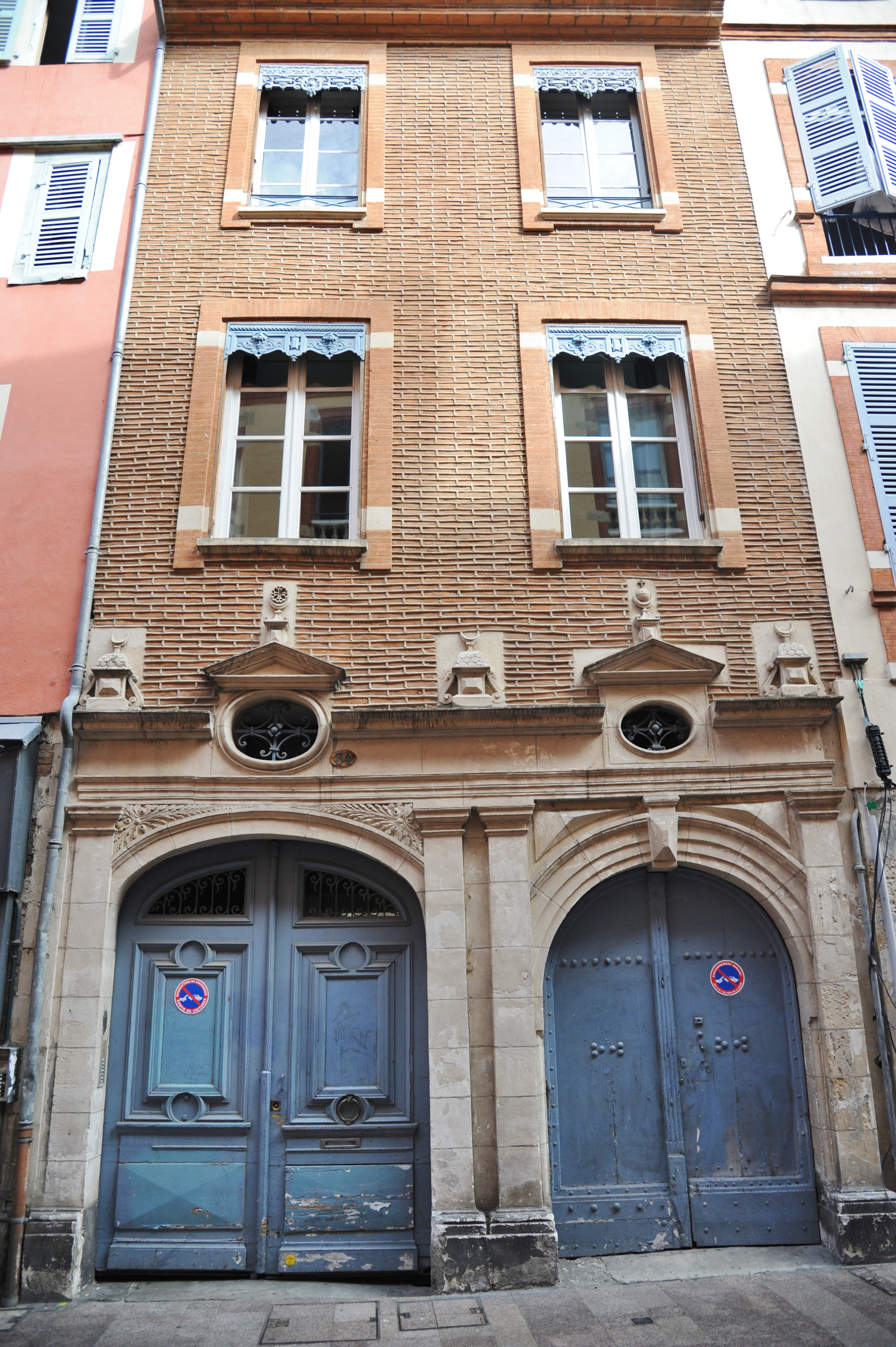
Hôtel Lagorrée.

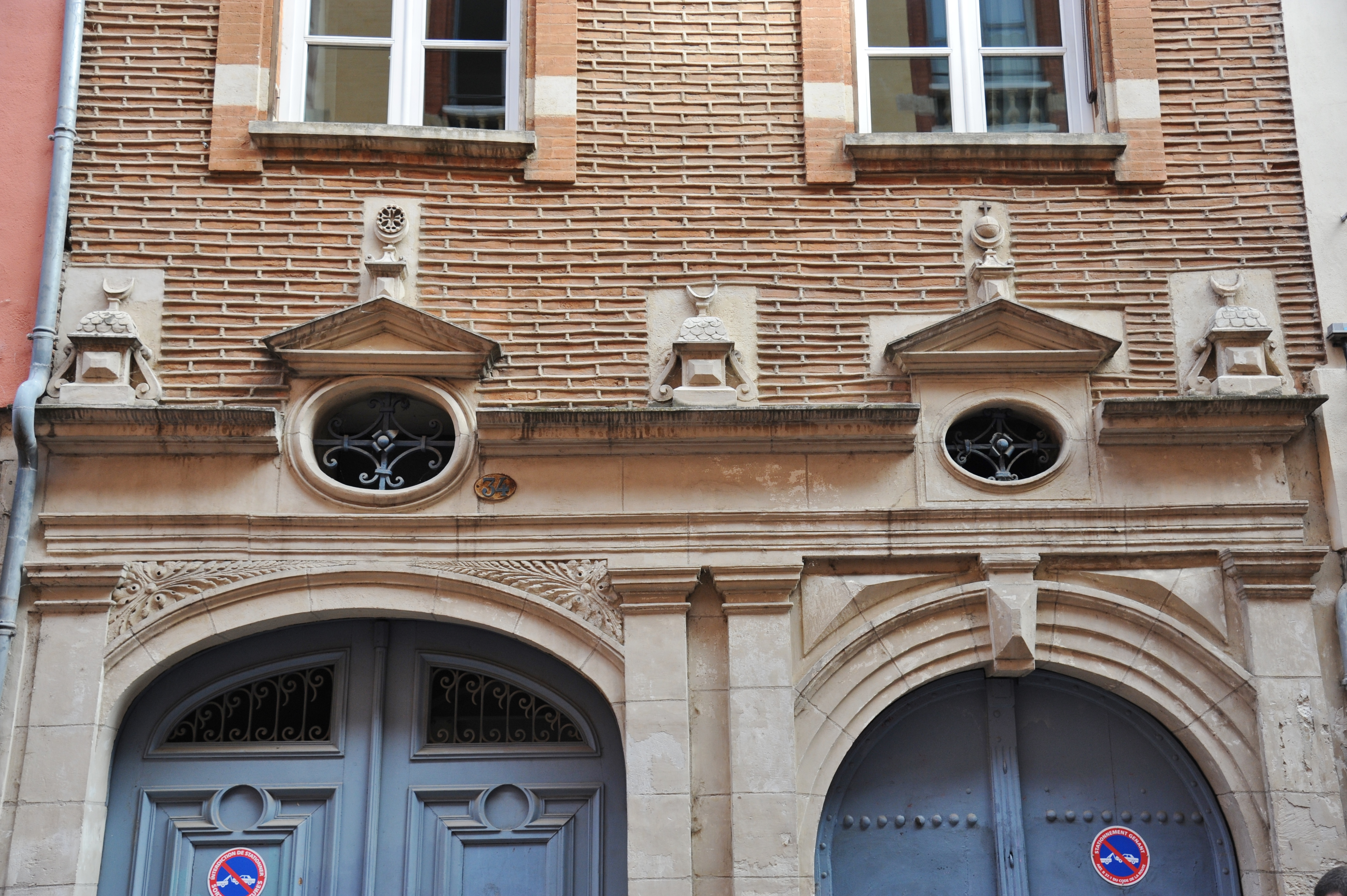
Hôtel Lagorrée.

==== Hôtel de Lestang ====
Address: 20 rue Saint-Jacques.

Built after 1593 for Christophe de Lestang, bishop of Lodève and later bishop of Alet then Carcassonne. On a 3,000 m² plot in the ecclesiastical quarter, a large rectangular two-storey building faces a vast garden with its fine façade and entrance. The brick-walled stair is decorated with pilasters and large shell niches. Openings alternating brick and stone foreshadow the two-tone fashion of the following century.

On place Saint-Jacques, the portal framed by alternating brick and stone—bossed or vegetalized—repeats this bichromy, giving visual harmony to the whole.

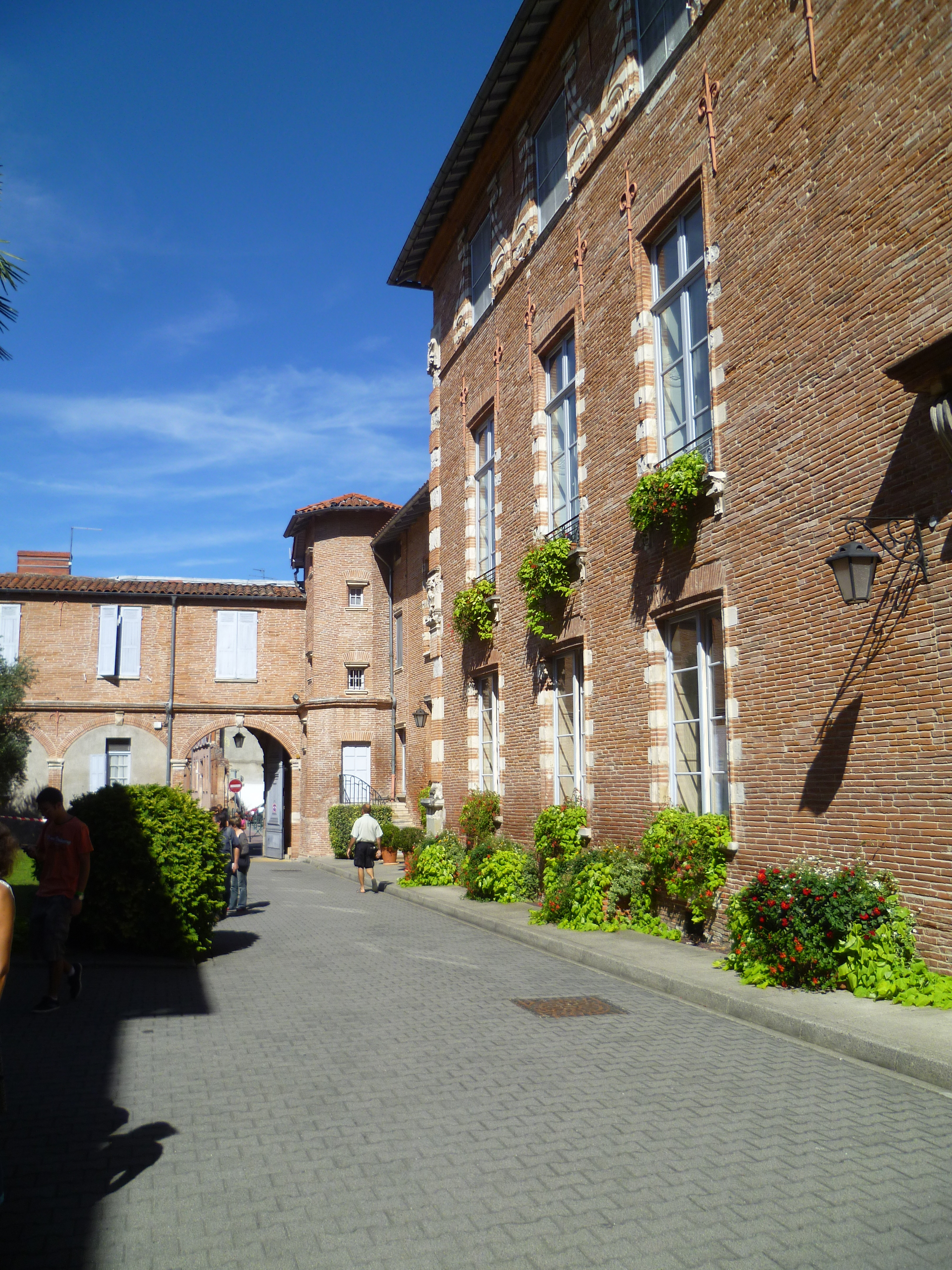
Court.

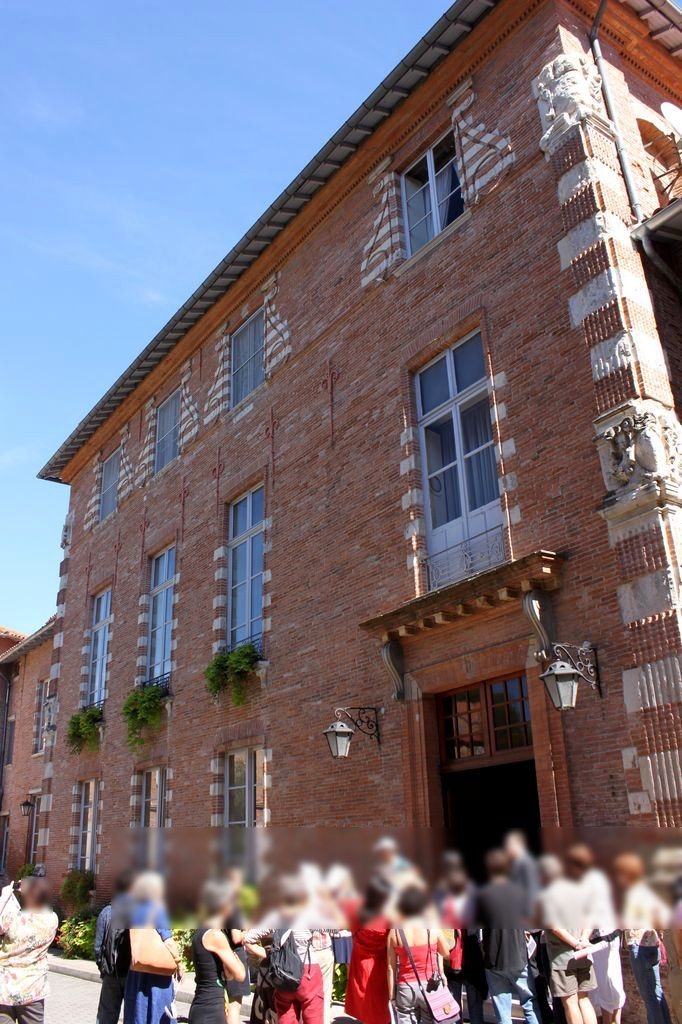
Hôtel de Lestang.

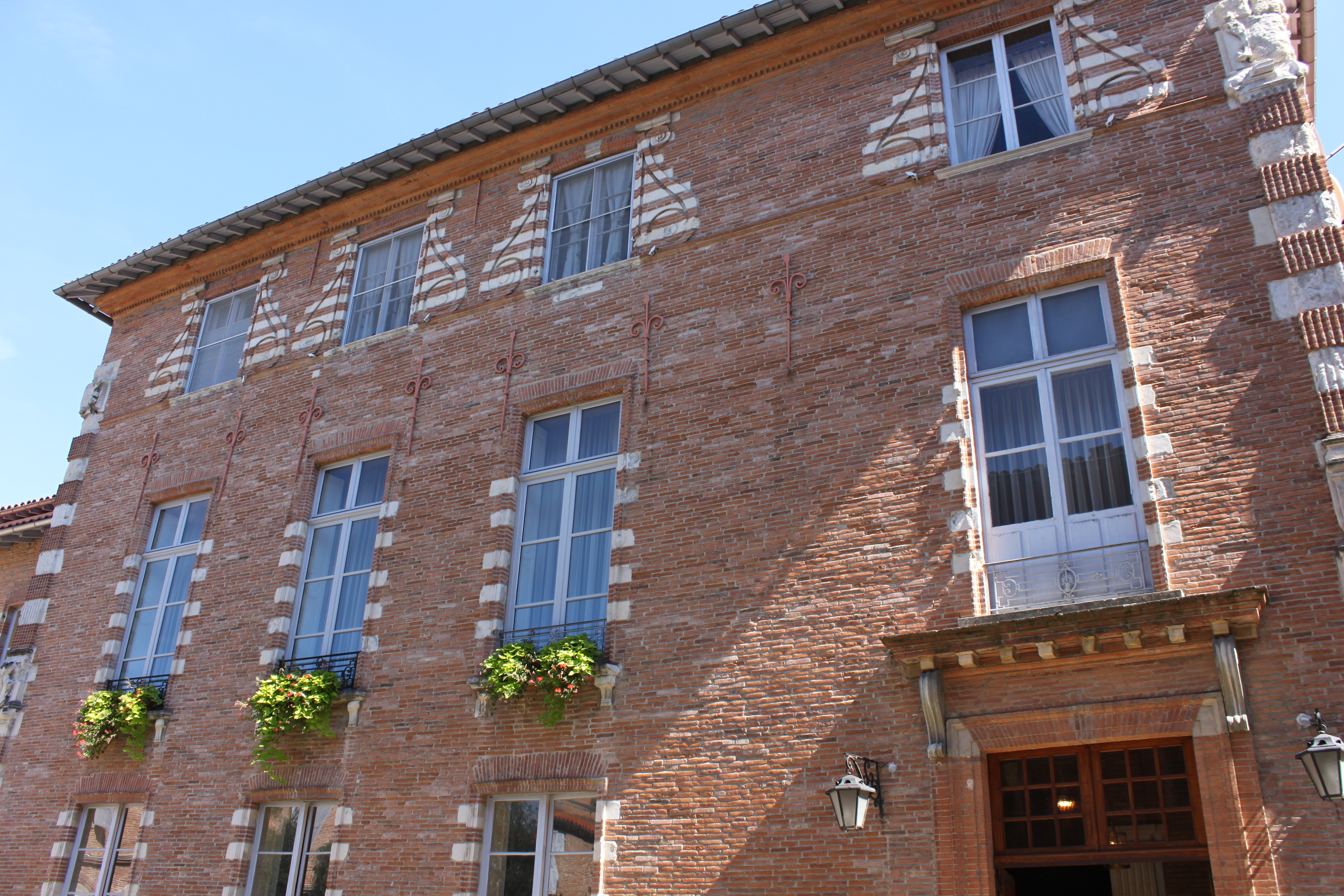
Garden façade.

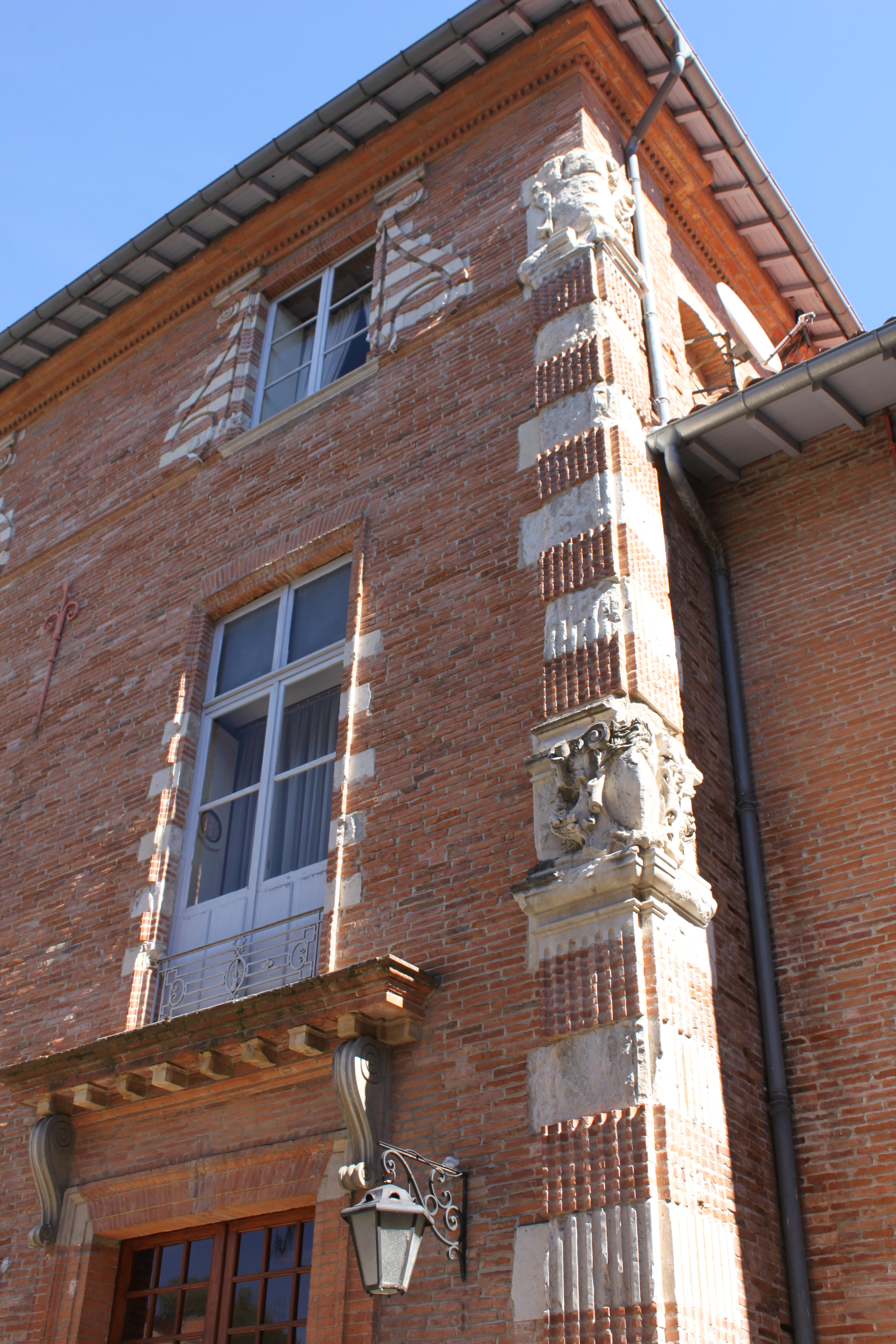
Angle pilaster.

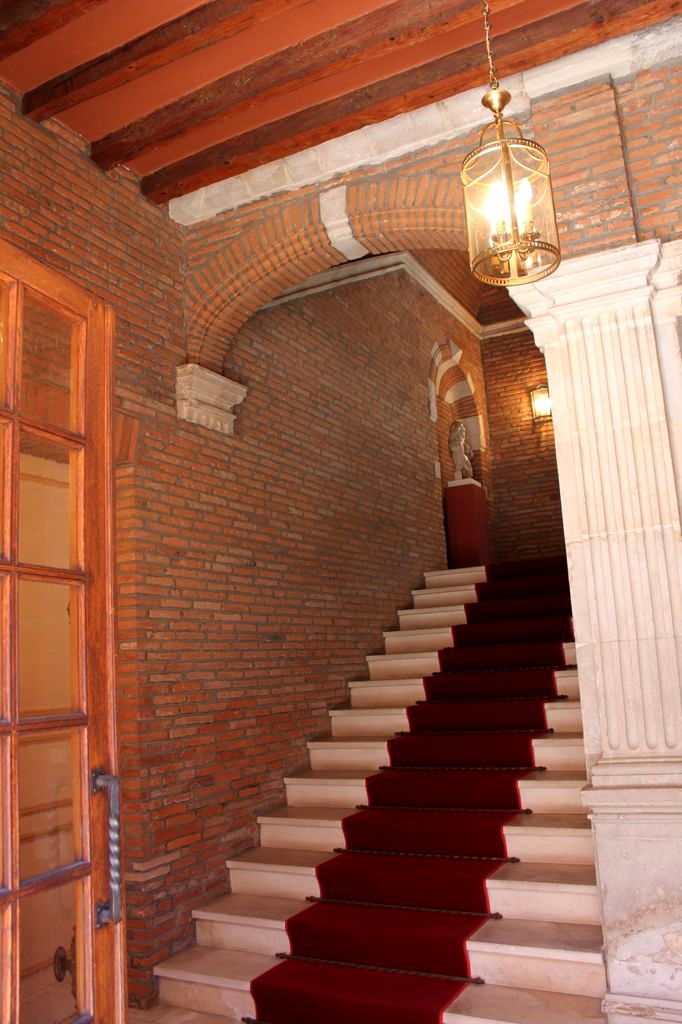
Stair.

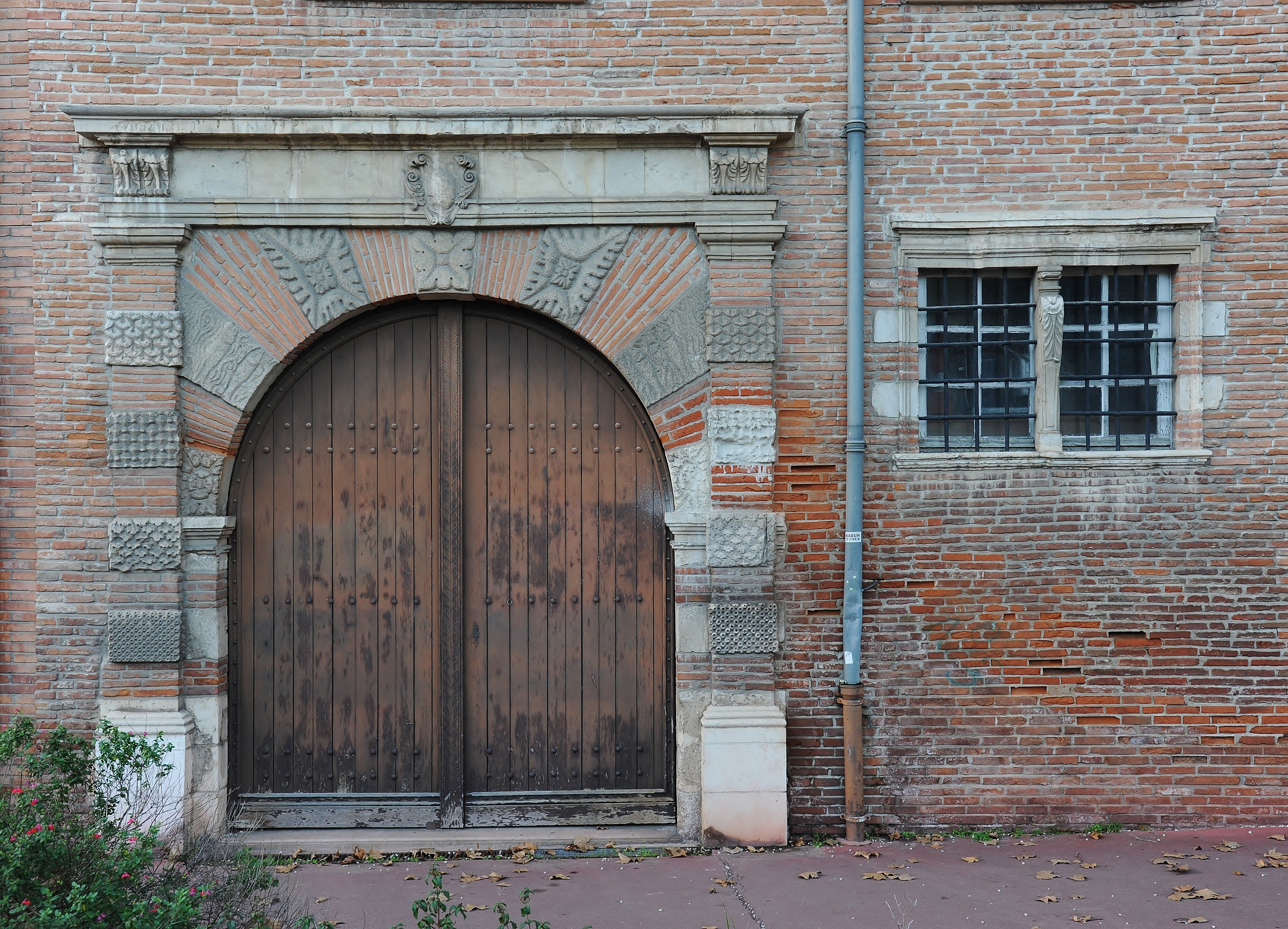
Portal on place Saint-Jacques.

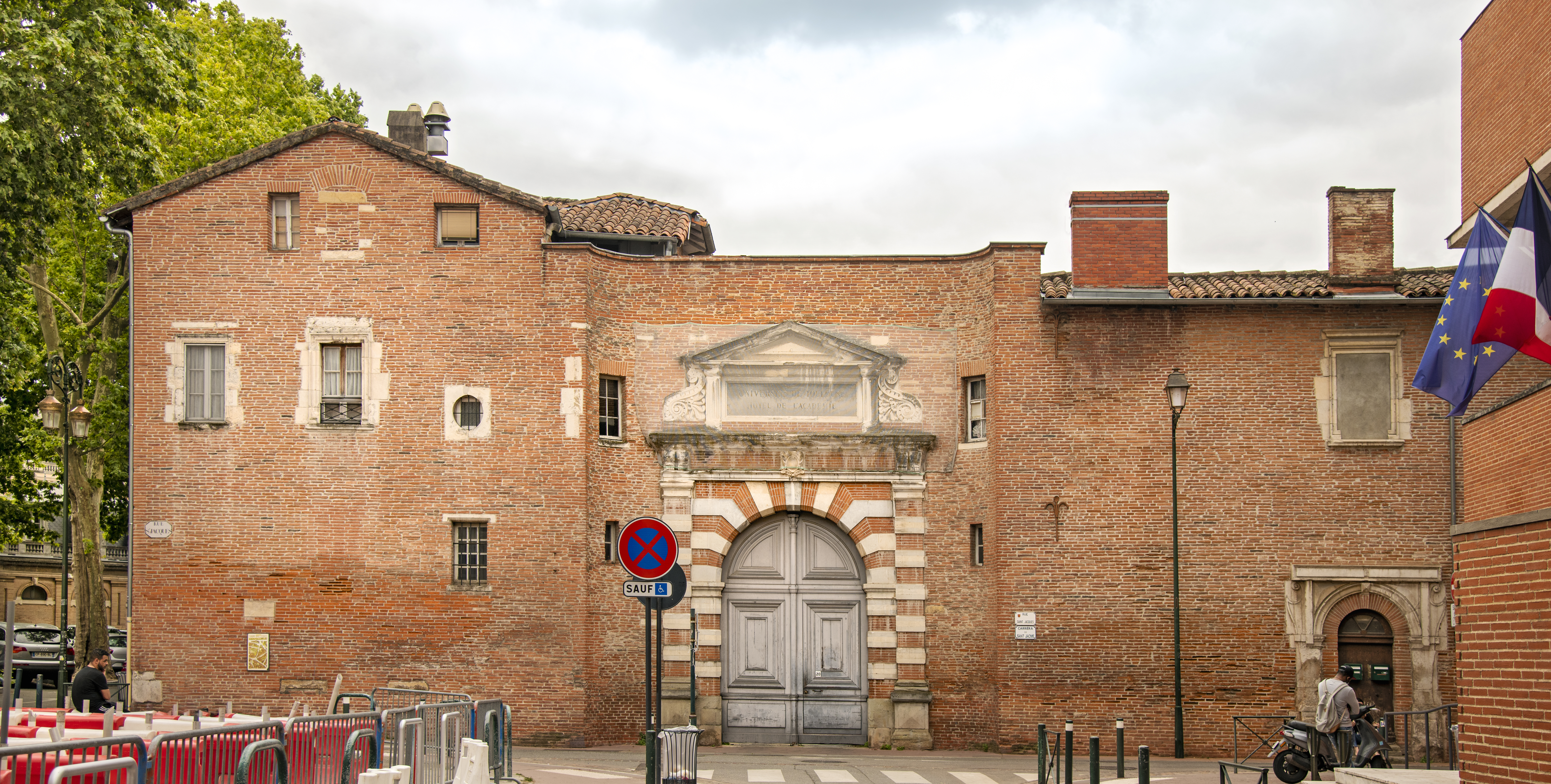
Street façade with 19th-century portal.

==== Hôtel de Mansencal ====
Address: 1 rue Espinasse.

Jean de Mansencal, First President of the Parlement and reputedly learned, built c. 1540–1560 a townhouse between court and garden. On the court, elevations dominated by the stair-tower are pierced with stone bays with double-shouldered surrounds; a gallery with basket-handle arches and stone consoles overlooks the court. The square stair-tower, one of the tallest in the city, contains a spiral stair ending in a vault whose ribs spring from a Corinthian column.

On the garden side (now a school yard) stood the most impressive façade, of which only two of the five original bays remain, separated by antique-style brick pilasters with superposed orders. The rounded bays with double-shouldered surrounds and classical colonnettes are inscribed in full-centred arches; those of the top level recall the windows of the Palazzo Rucellai in Florence.

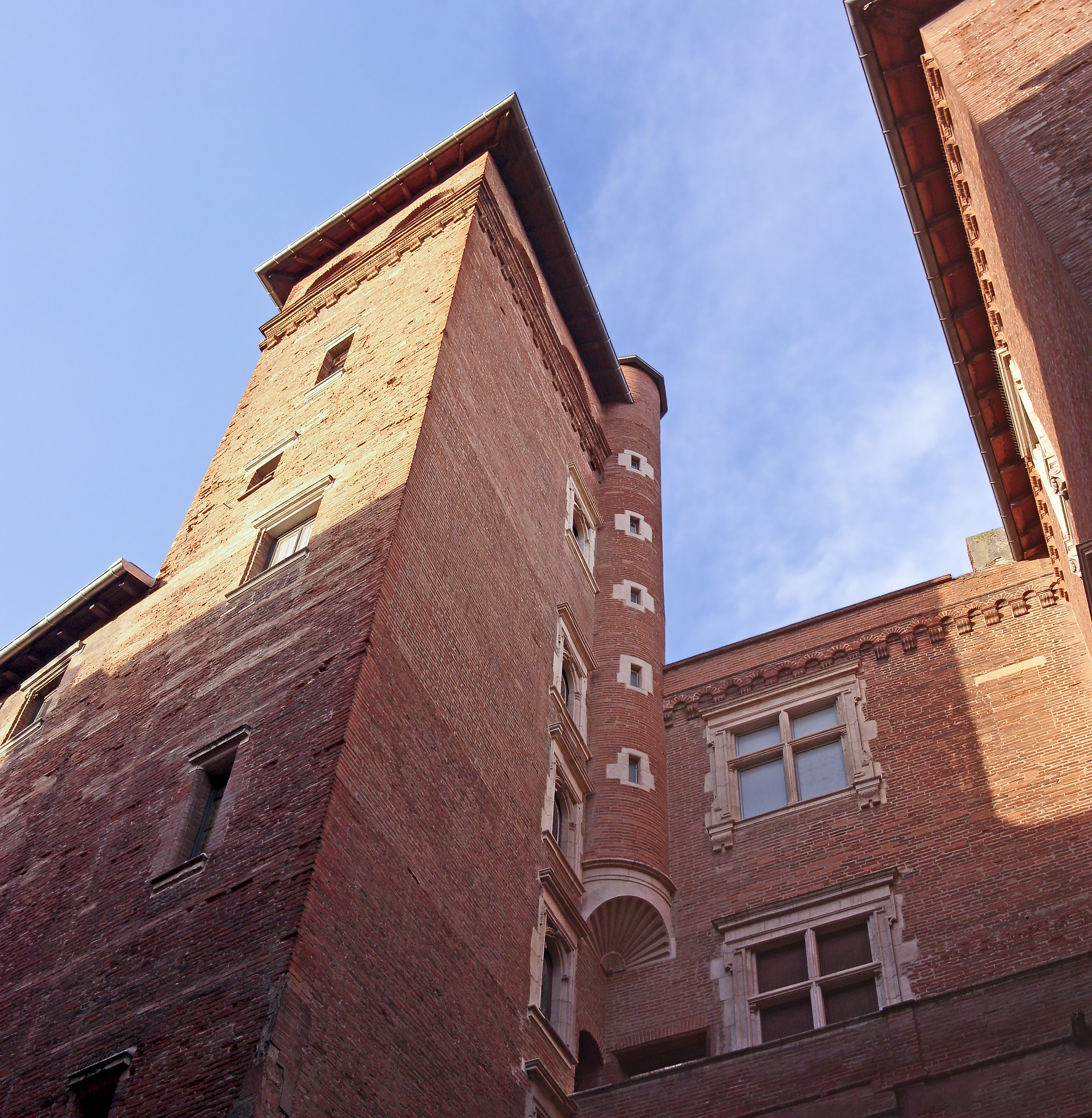
Street façades and tower.

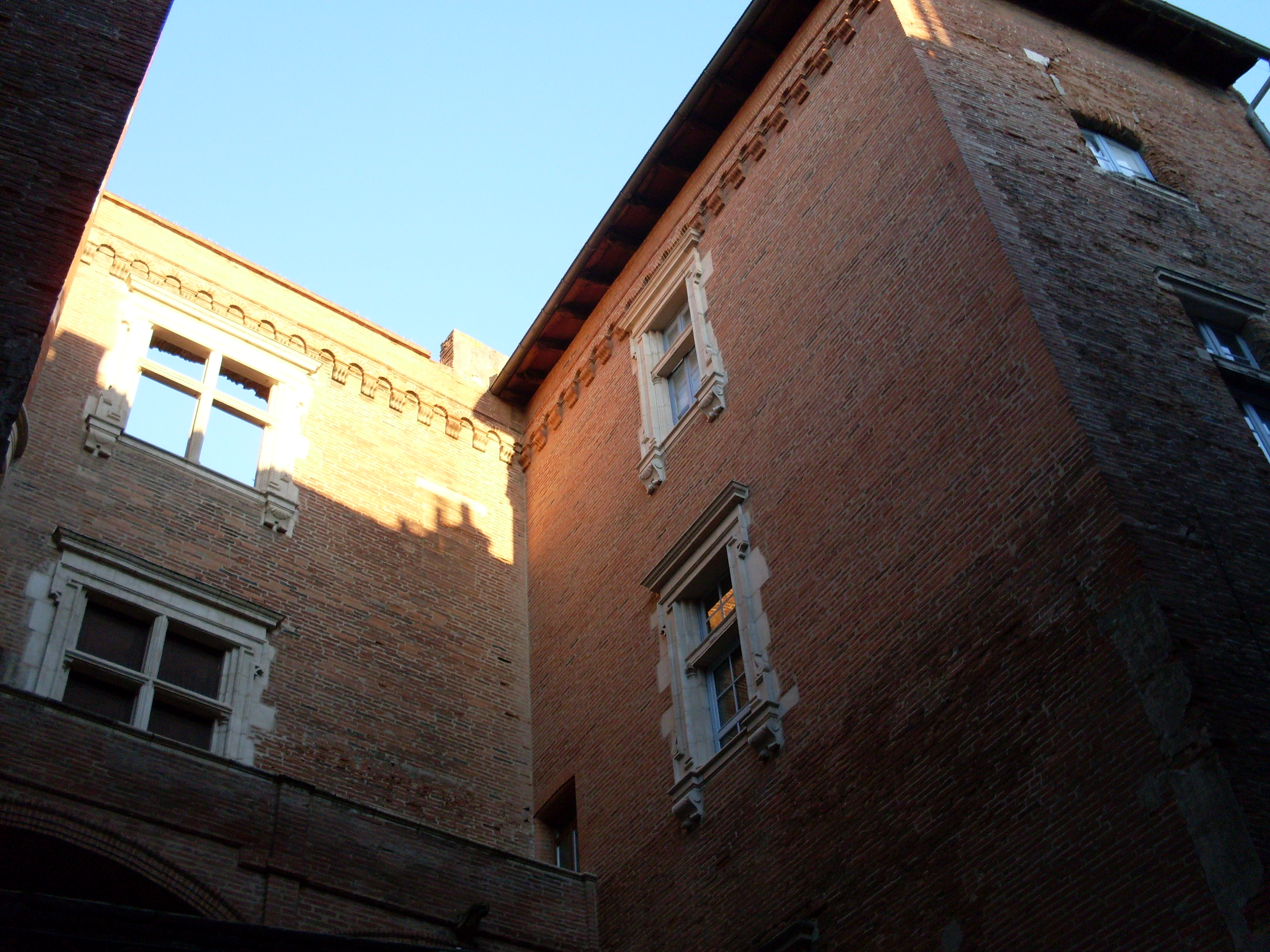
Street façades and tower.

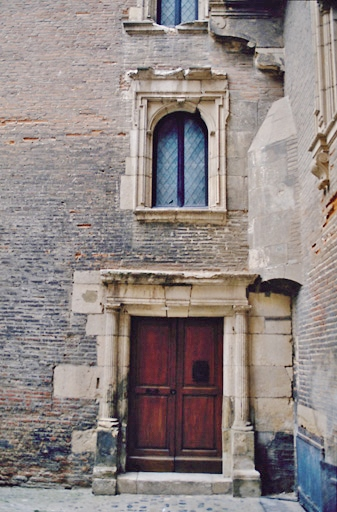
Tower window and door.

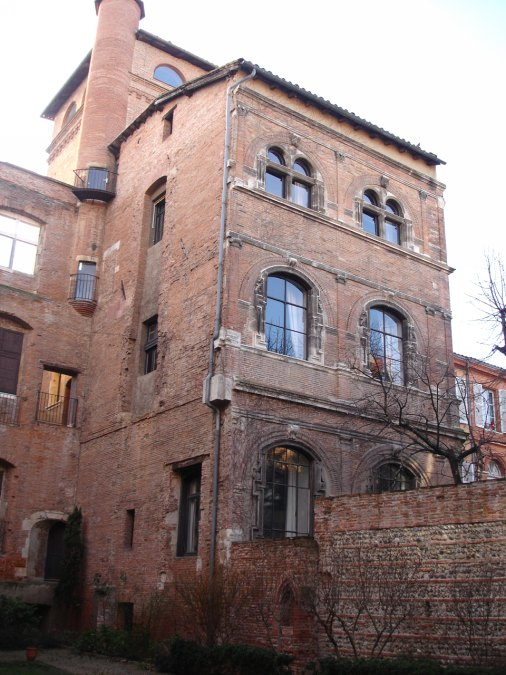
Garden façade.

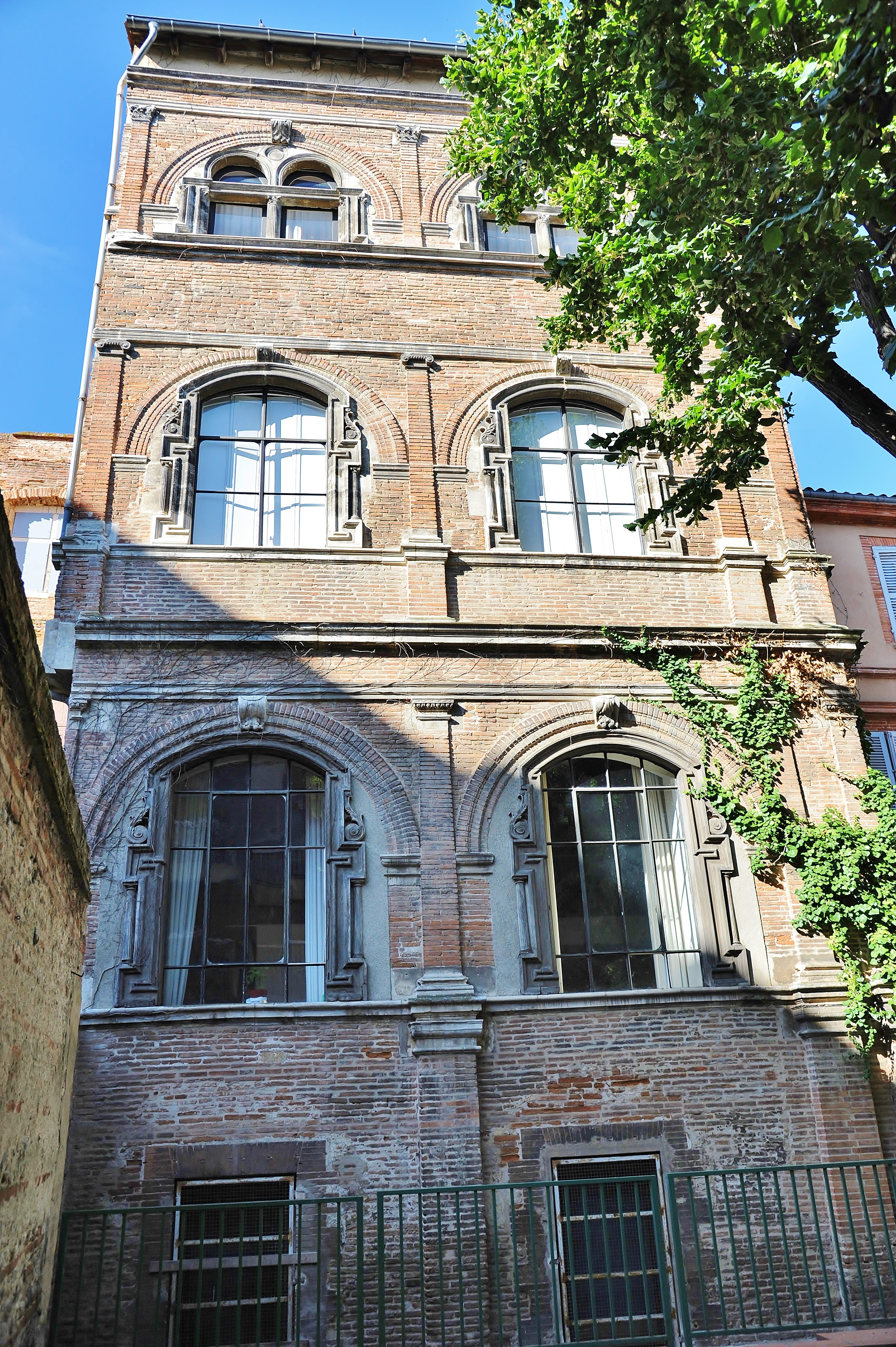
Garden façade.

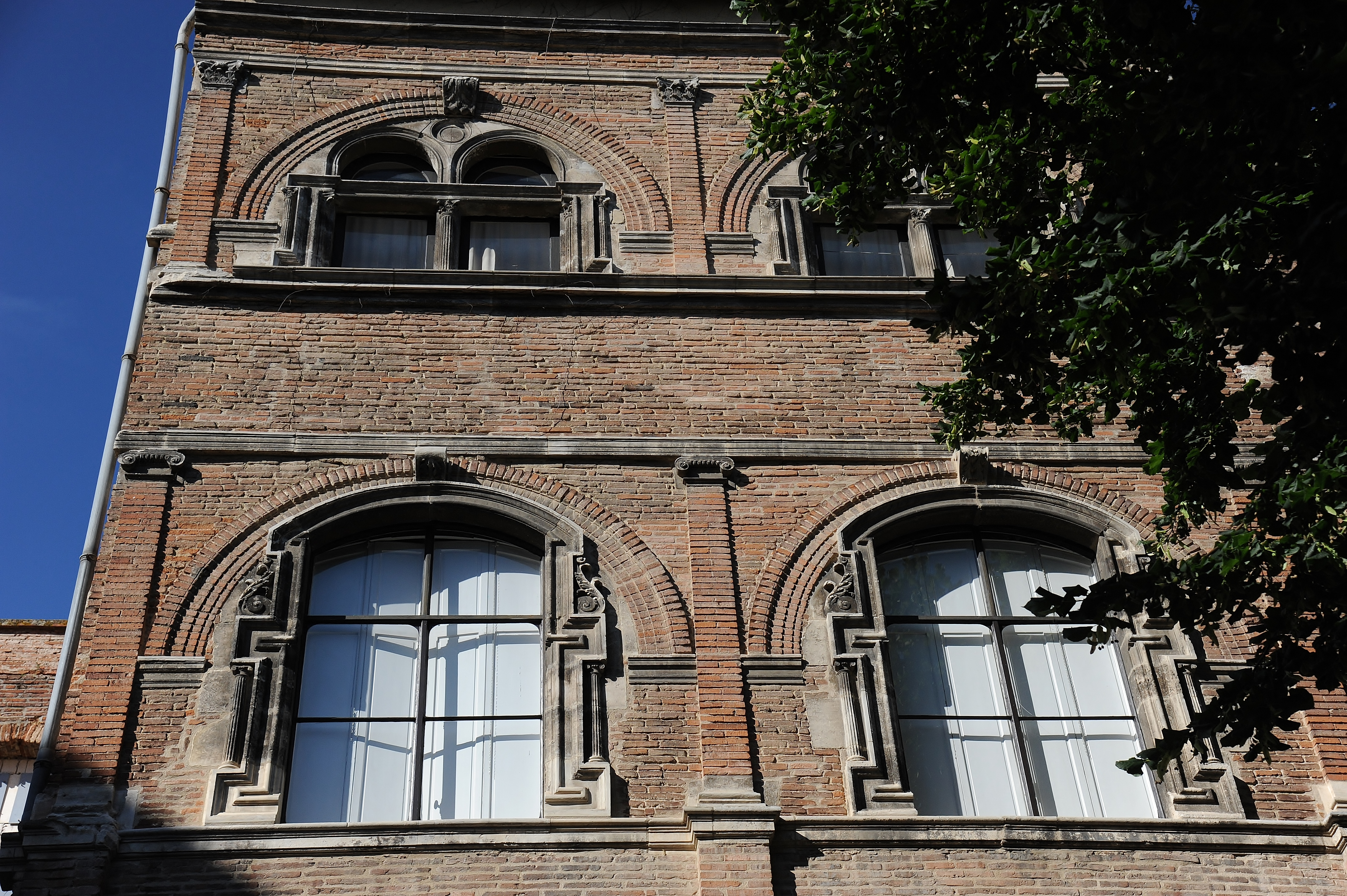
Upper levels of the garden façade.

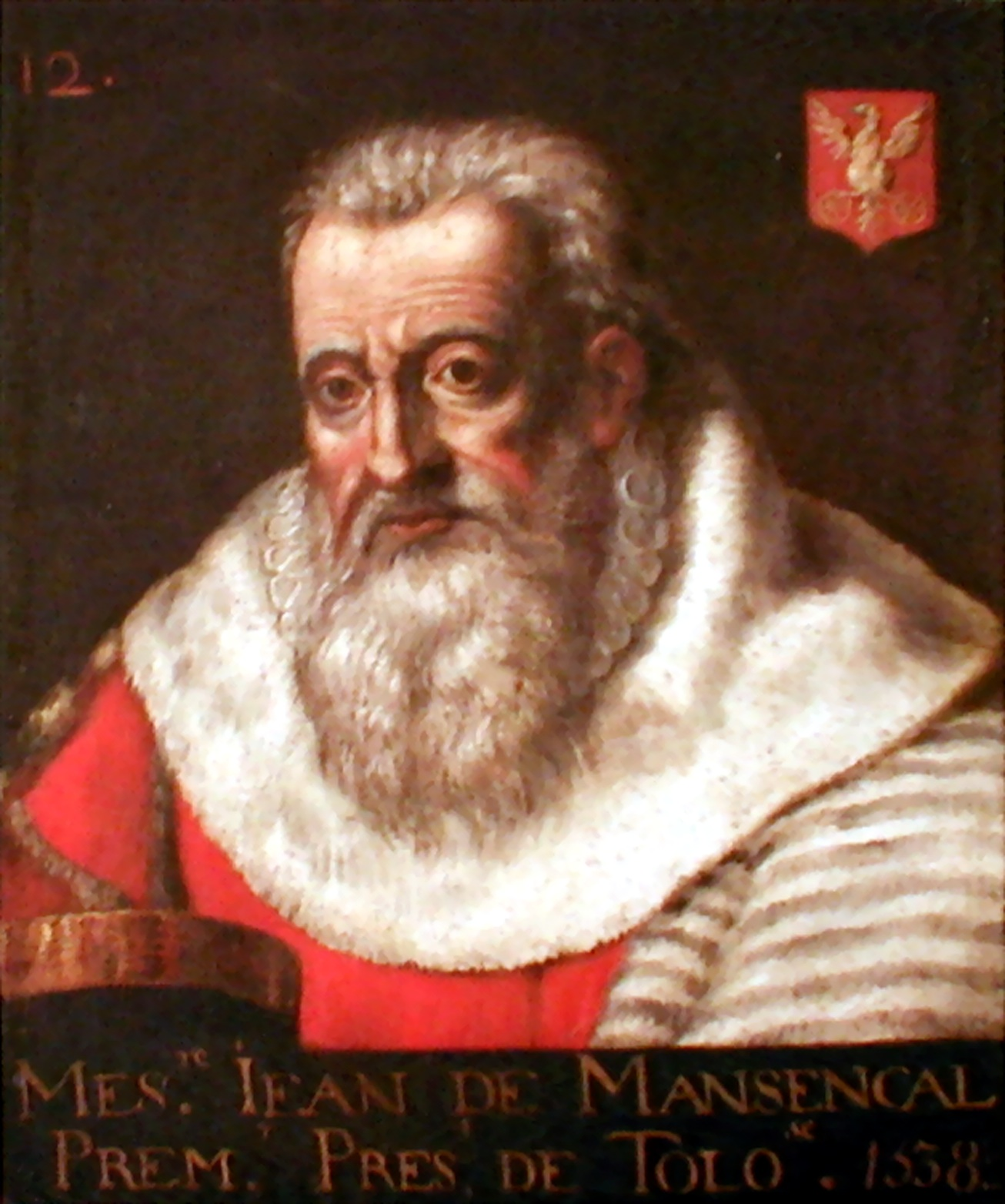
Portrait of Jean de Mansencal.

==== Hôtel de Massas (Hôtel d’Aldéguier) ====
Address: 29 rue de la Dalbade.

Long attributed to owner Antoine d’Aldéguier, capitoul in 1603, construction seems rather to have begun in the last quarter of the 16th century under Géraud de Massas, Parlement counselor, and may be by architect Dominique Bachelier.

In the court, the windows are richly decorated; brick-and-stone polychromy and motifs such as masks, diamond points, hybrid monsters and terms reflect late-century Mannerism. An 1865 remodeling to regularize the court led to a complete reworking of the north façade and the loss of a corbelled gallery similar to that at Assézat; only the brick arches with stone diamond points remain.

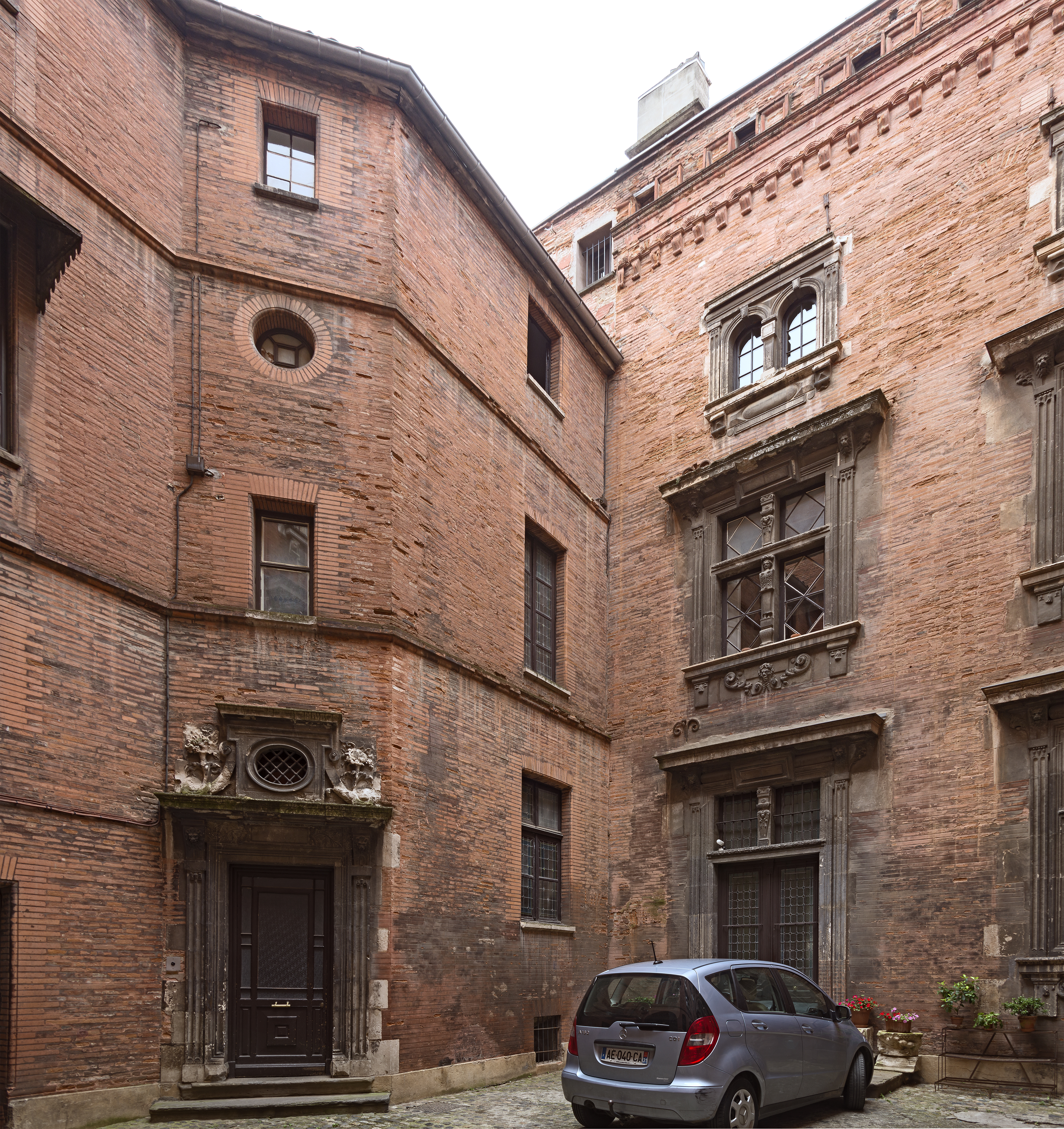
Court.

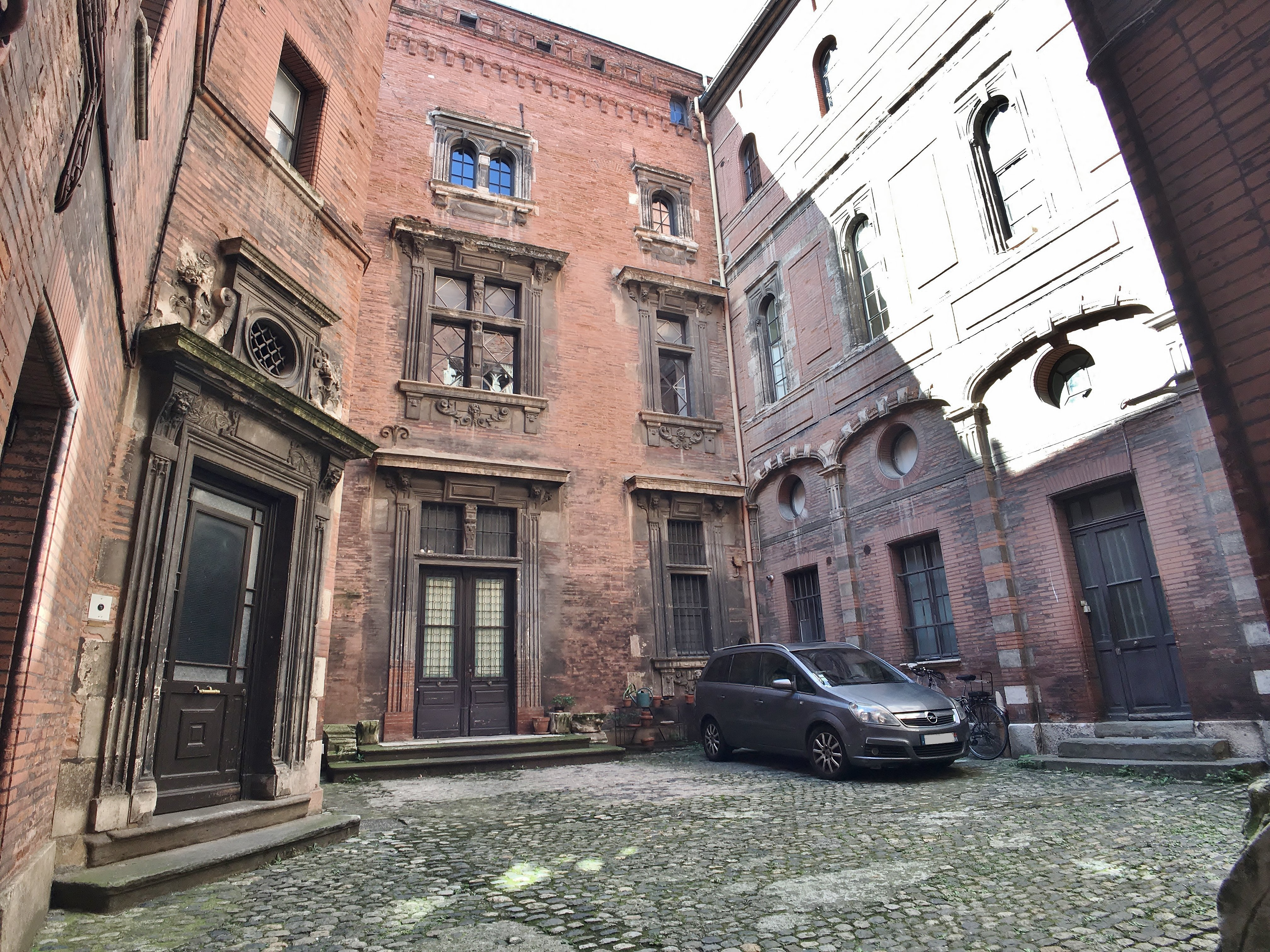
Court.

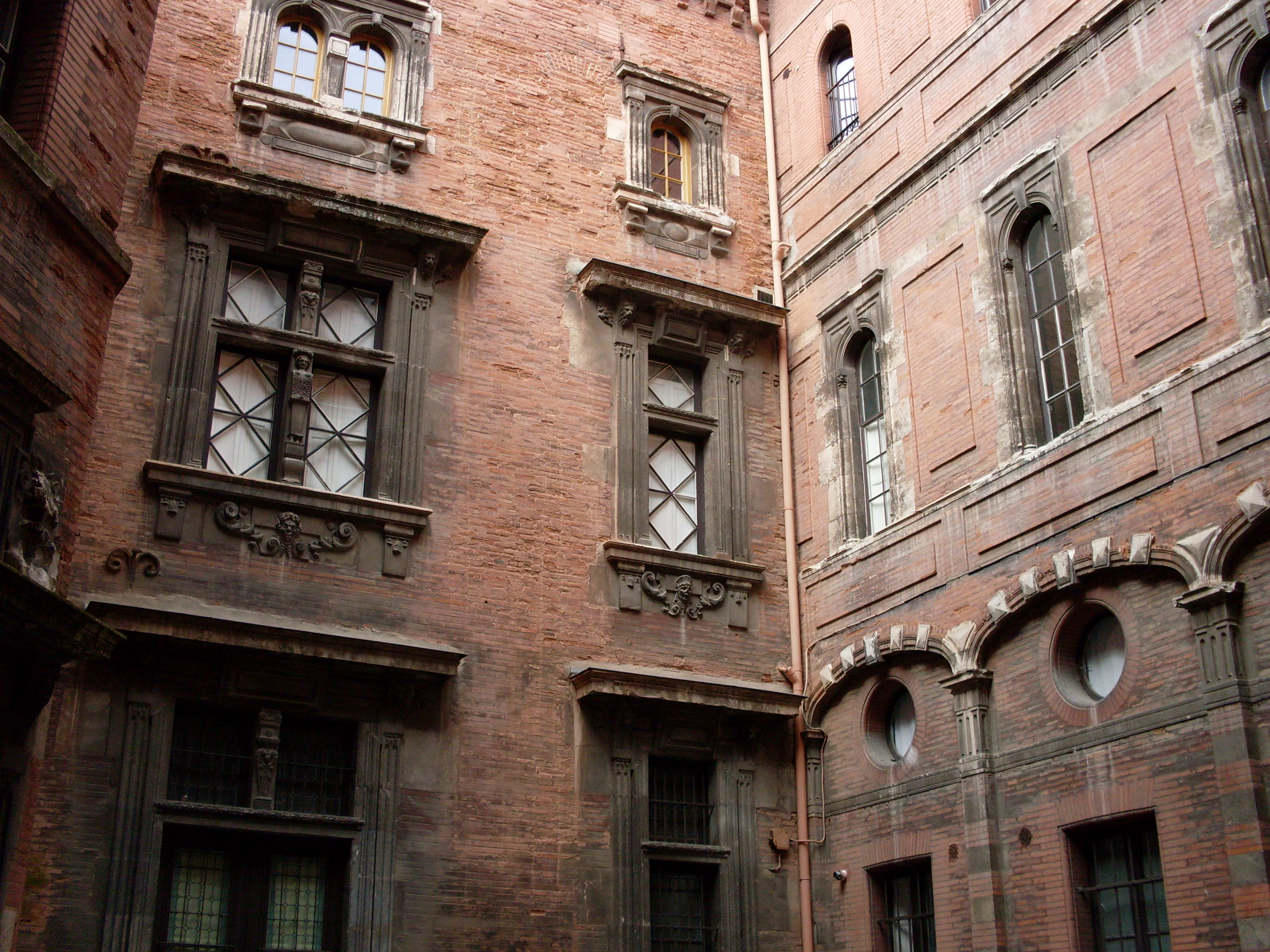
West façade.

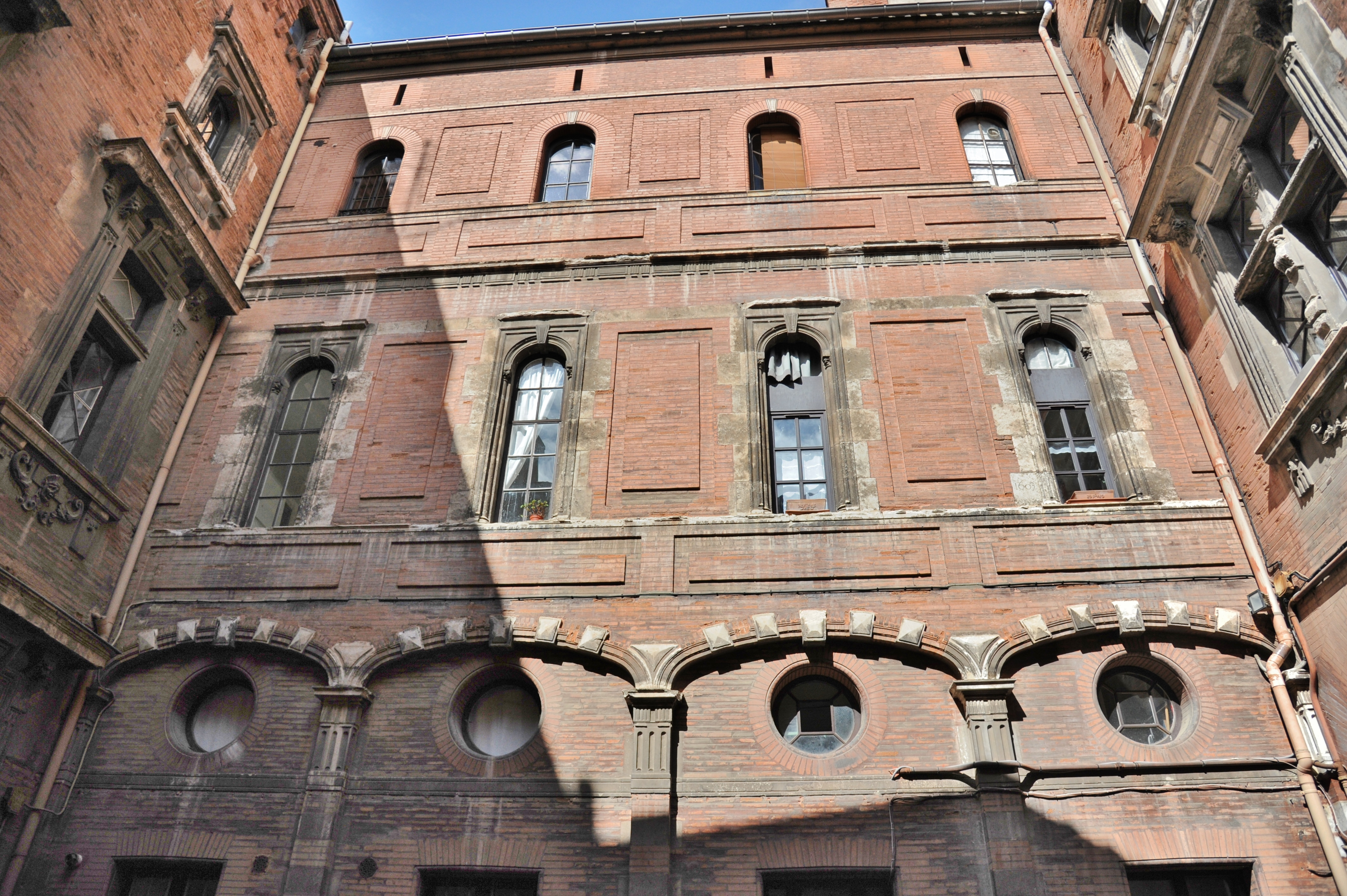
North façade reworked in the 19th century.

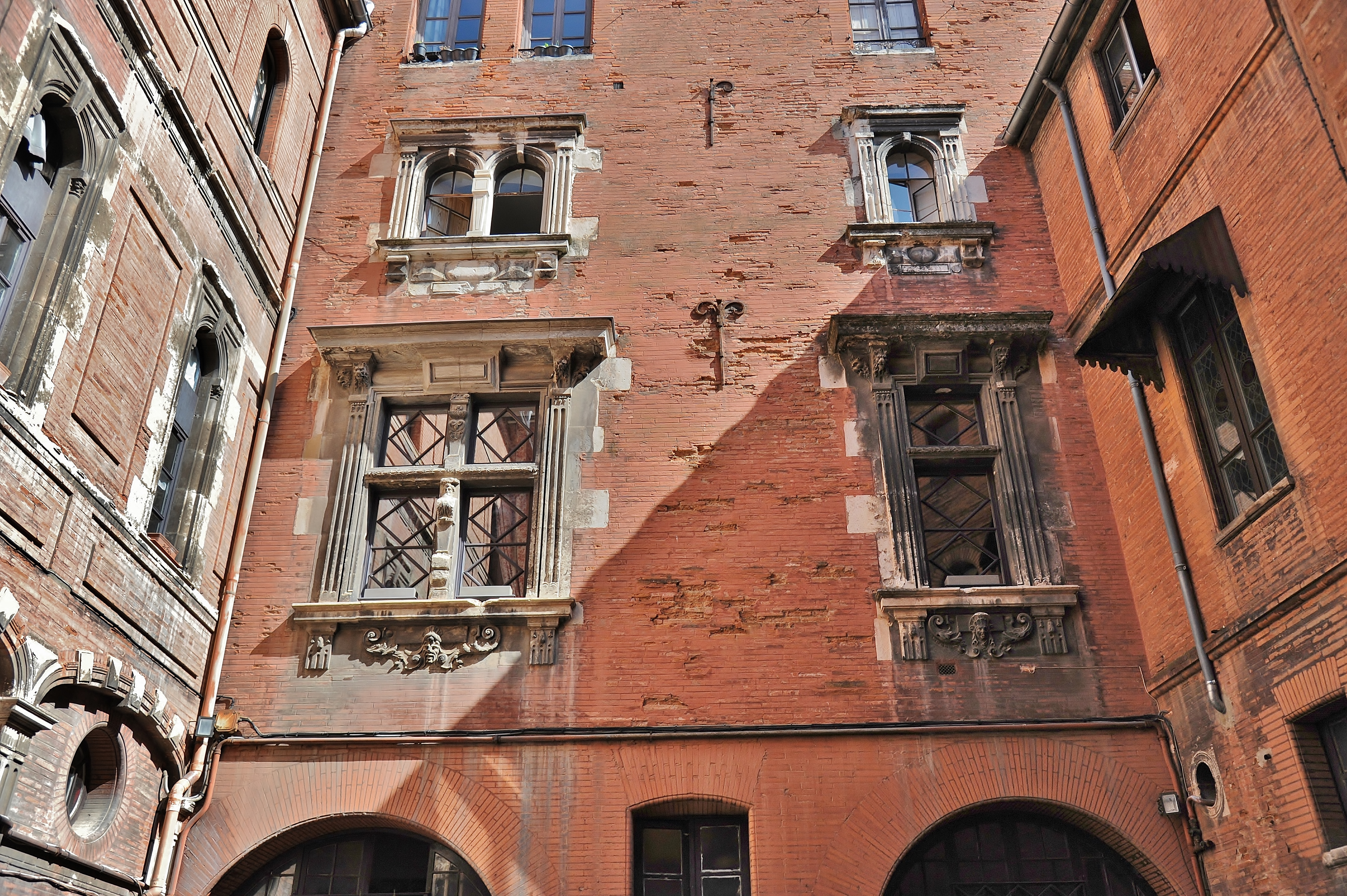
East façade.

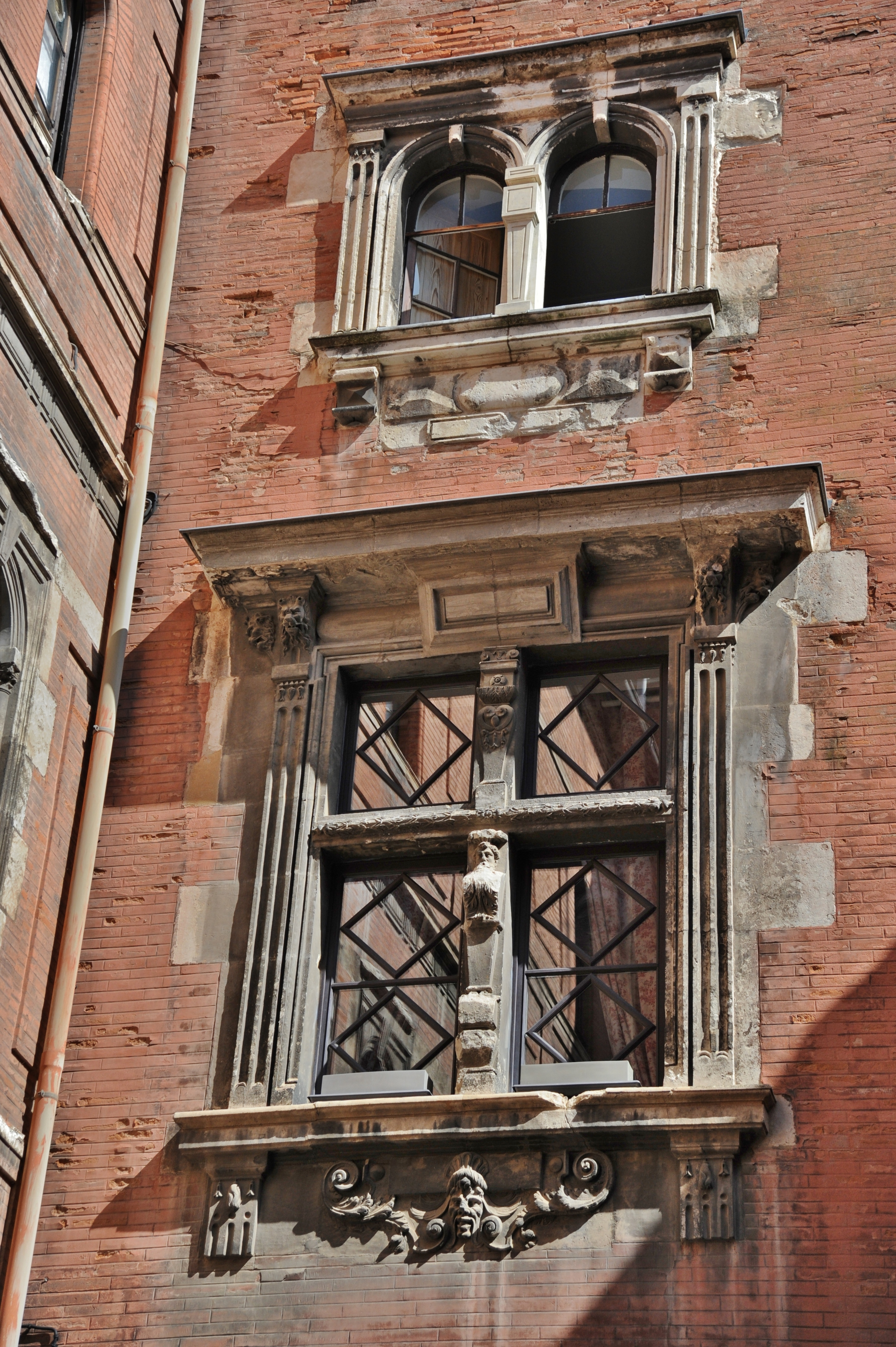
Windows.

==== Hôtel de Molinier (Hôtel de Felzins) ====
Address: 22 rue de la Dalbade.

Built between 1550 and 1556 for parlementary counselor Gaspard Molinier. Notable for its 1556 Mannerist portal derived from a model in Serlio’s 1551 Extraordinary Book, showing how quickly prestigious models were adapted in Toulouse.

Thanks to Dominique Bertin, “purveyor of marble to the king,” dozens of cut and polished marbles, set like gemstones, adorn the portal. Bertin had reopened ancient Roman quarries in the Pyrenees to supply royal sites and worked with leading royal architects (Lescot, Primaticcio, De l’Orme). Co-author of a Toulouse edition of Vitruvius, he likely played a major role in the portal’s design, with terms after Marcantonio Raimondi, harpies, masks, strapwork, vases and garlands in bellifontain spirit. These marbles thus both recalled imperial Rome’s splendor and matched the rarest, most luxurious court taste, illustrating a Toulouse particularity and its reach.

In the rear court (formerly a garden), superbly carved putti adorn a corbelled turret, playing with a vegetal garland symbolizing abundance and fertility. Inside, a monumental 16th-century fireplace in Henry II style bears, above a relief of Hercules, the inscriptions Hercules Gallicus and Charitas nunquam excidit.

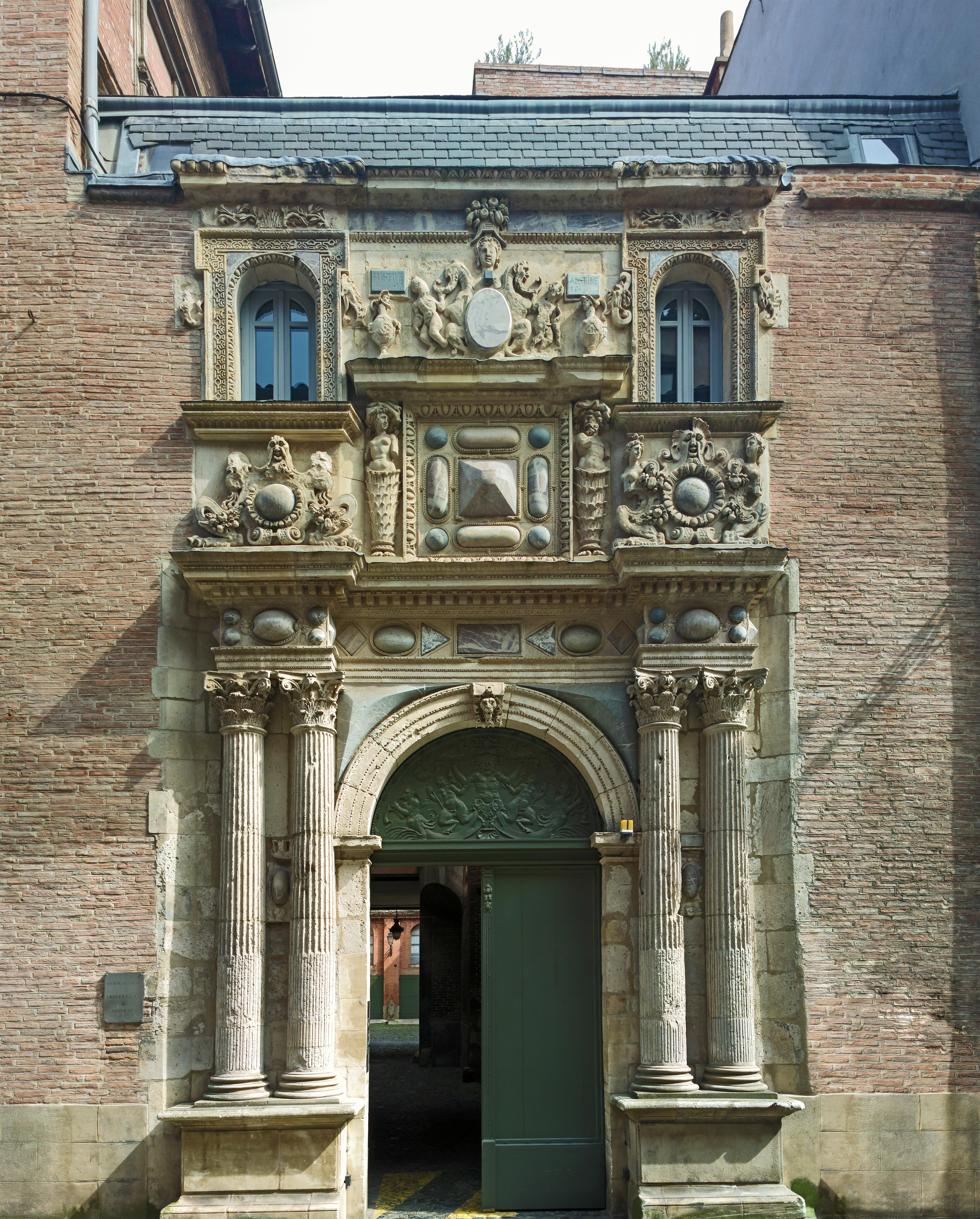
Portal on rue de la Dalbade.

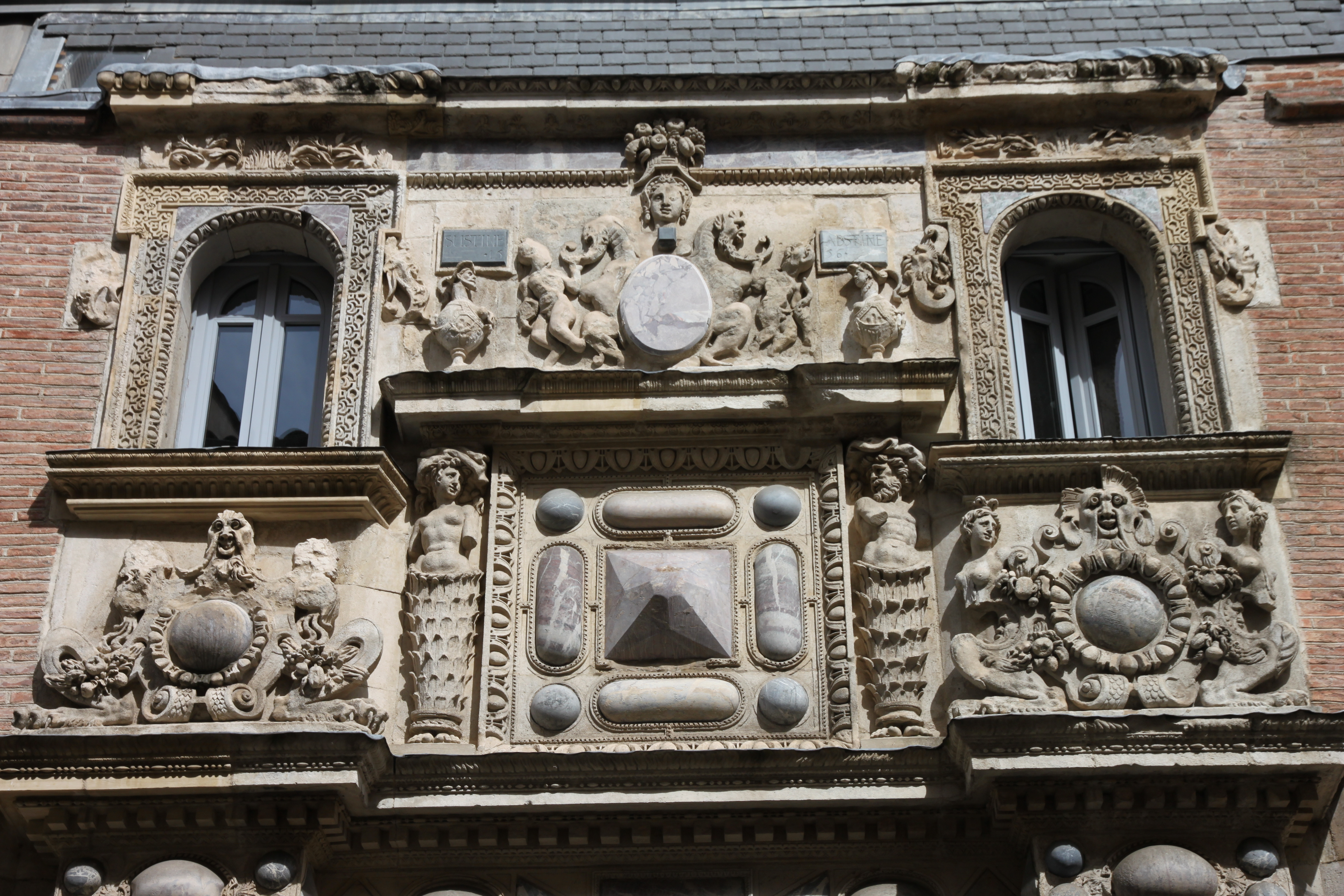
Sculptures and marbles.

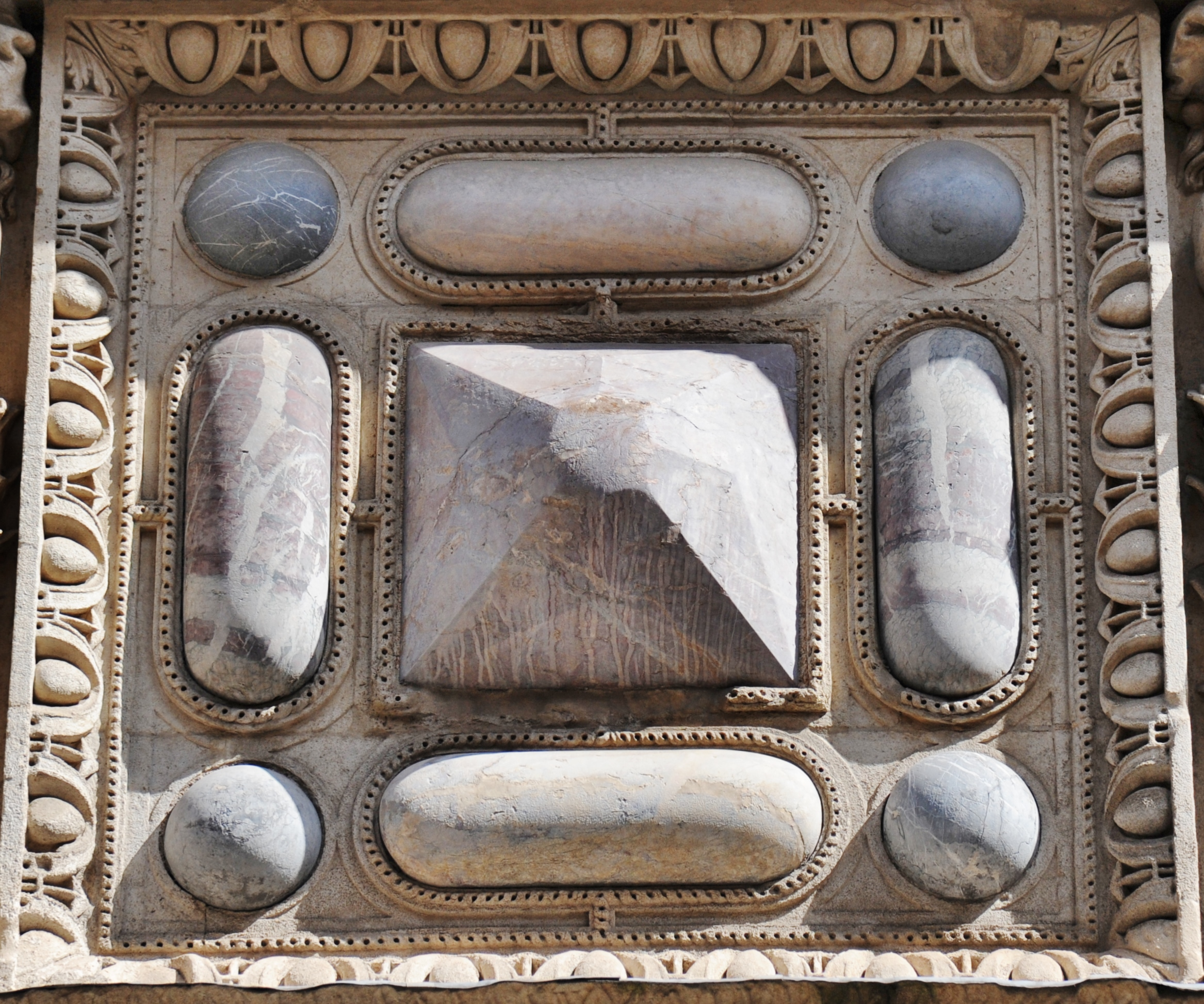
Pyrenean marbles.

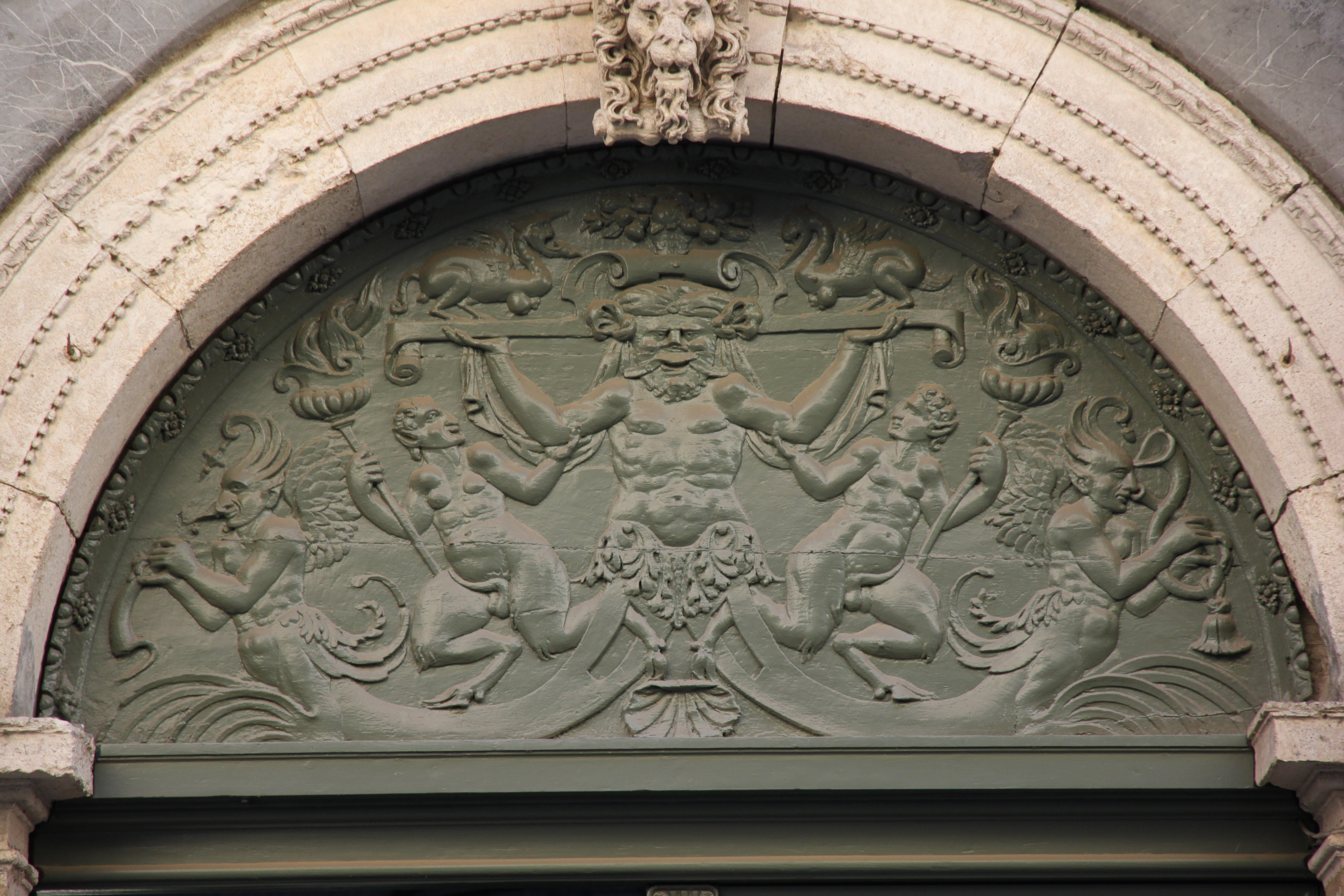
Tympanum.

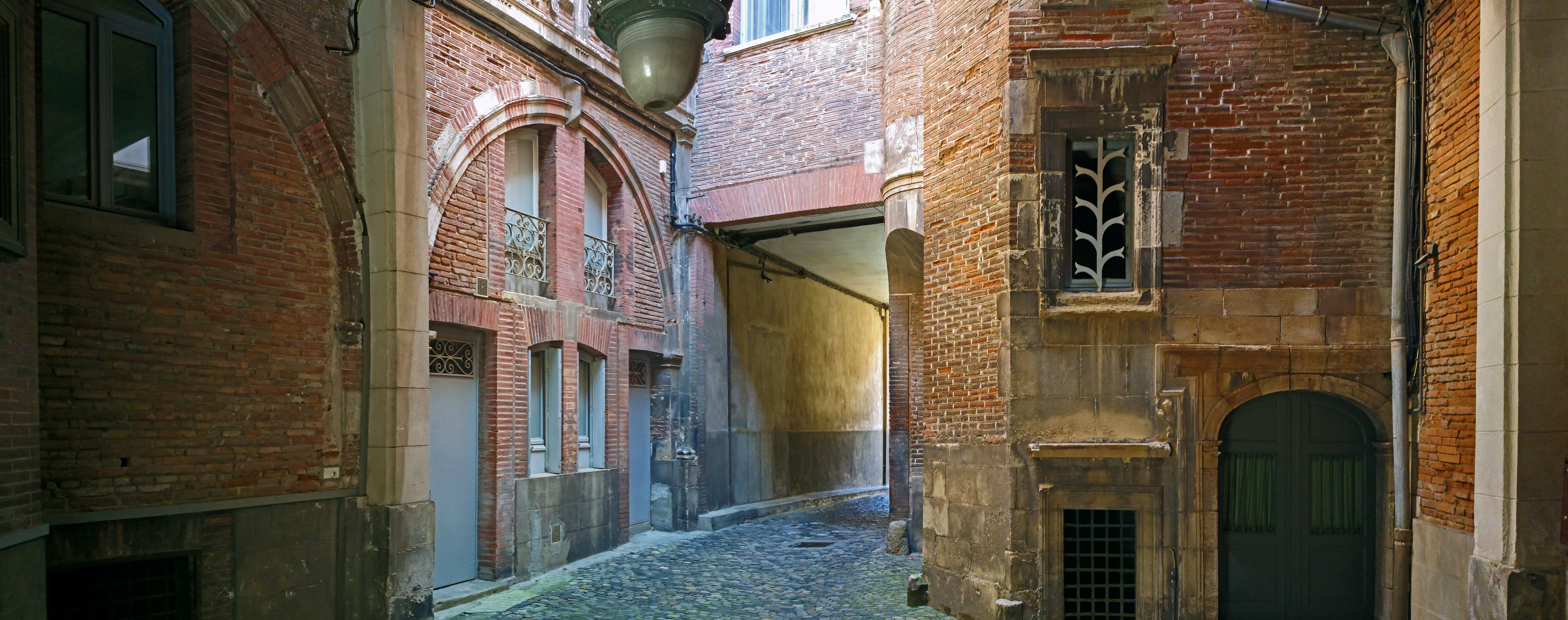
Passage to the court.

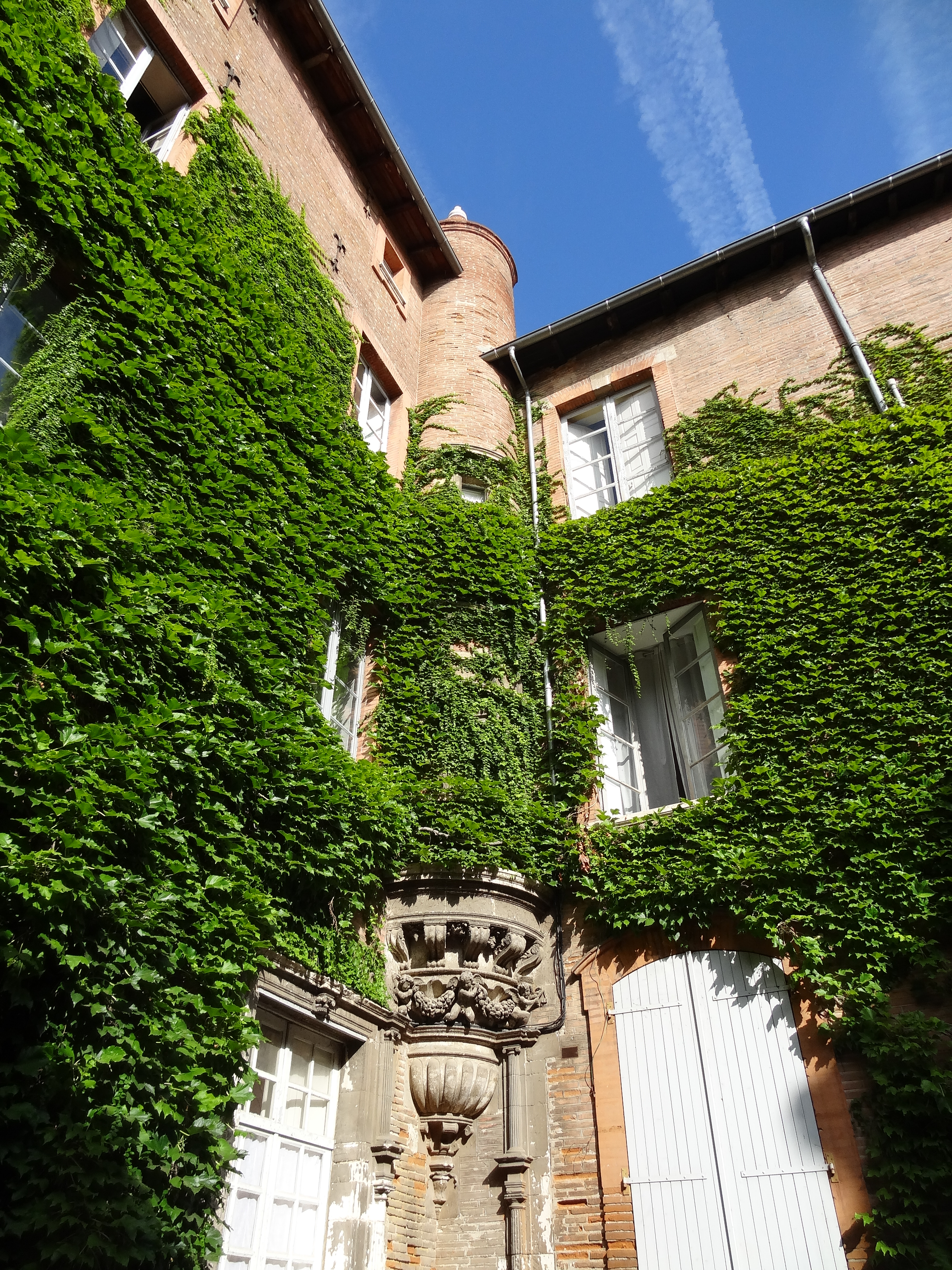
Turret in the court.

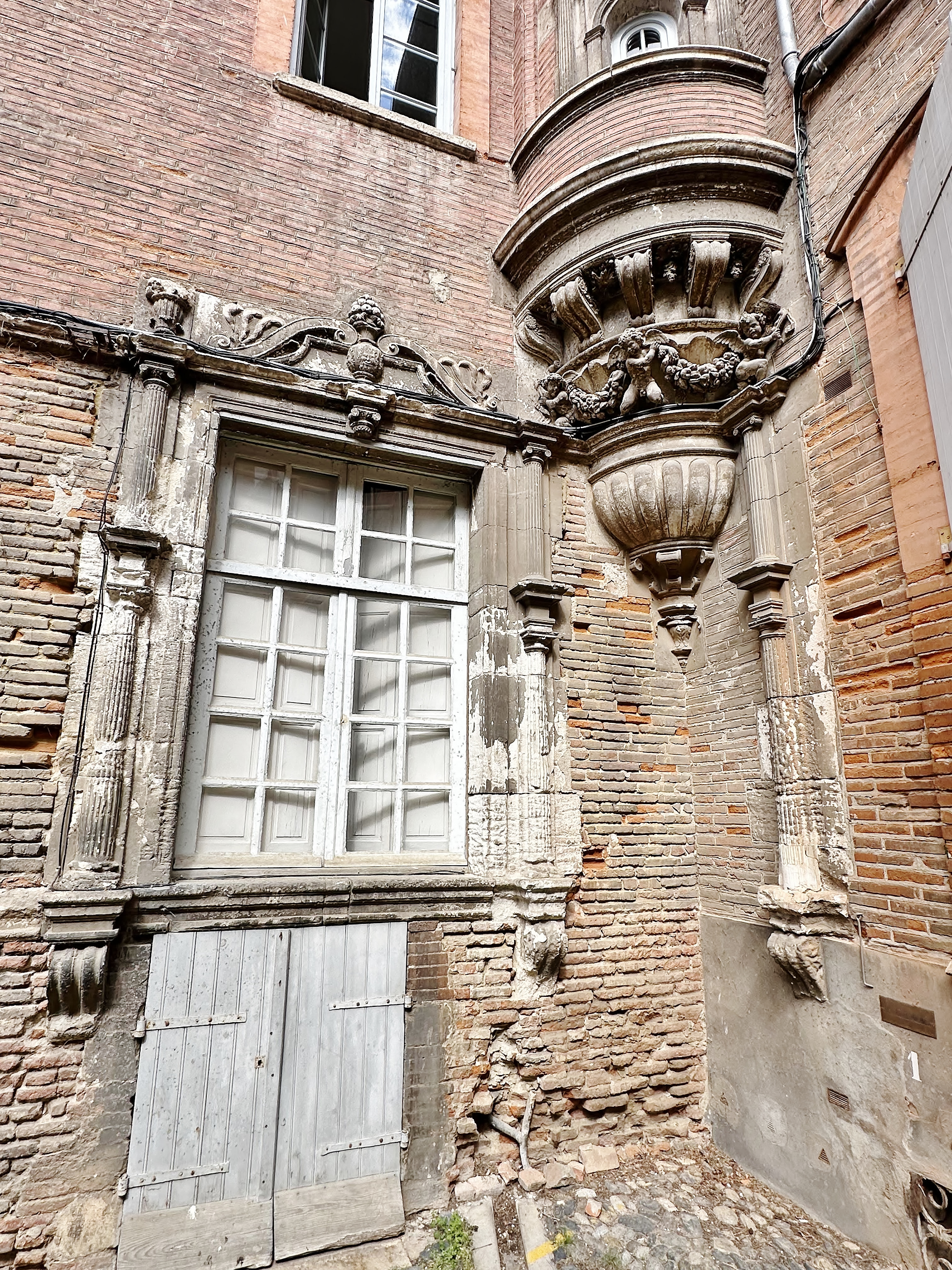
Window and turret in the court.

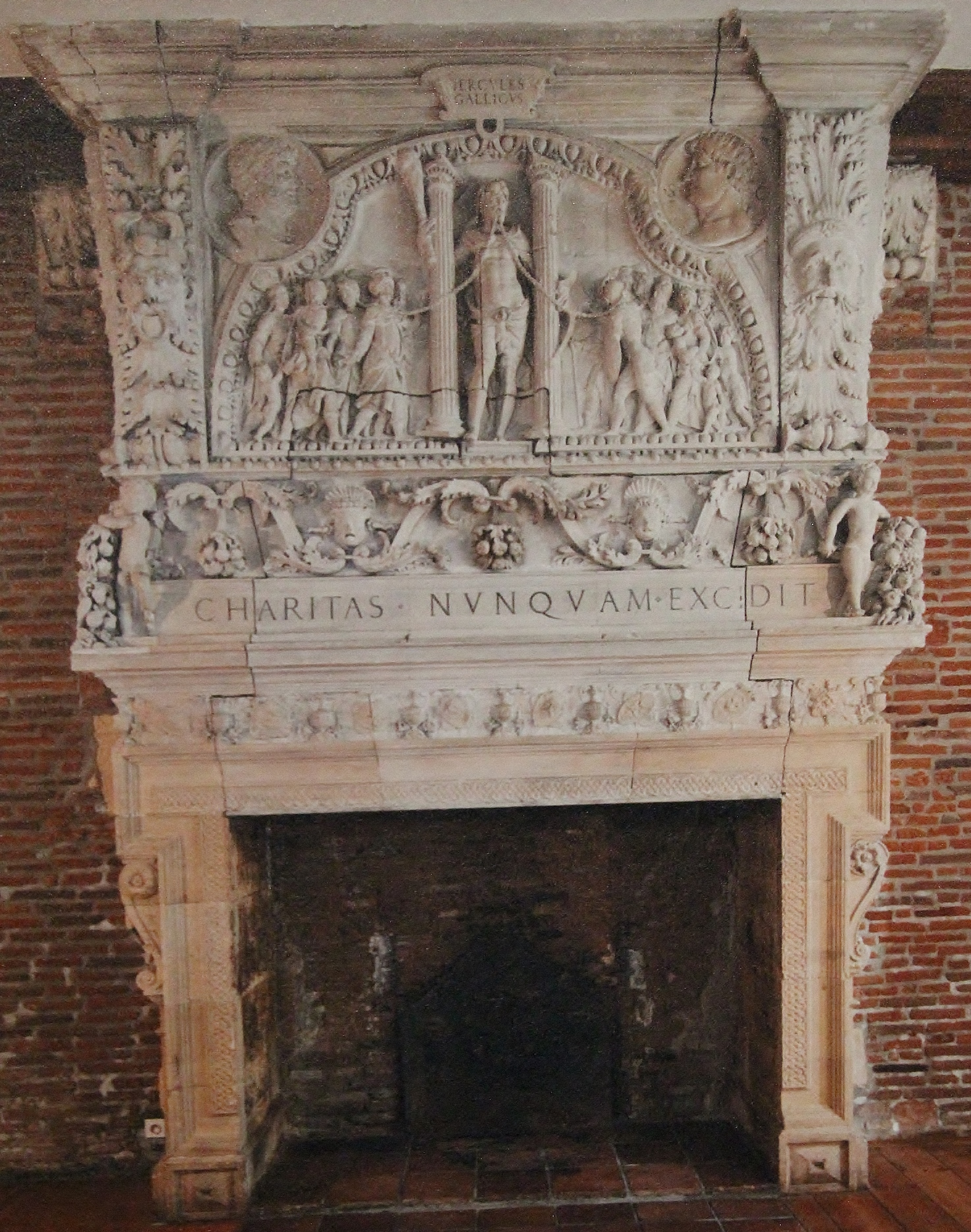
Fireplace representing the Gallic Hercules.

==== Hôtel de Pins ====
Address: 46 rue du Languedoc. Now Hôtel Antonin.

After a brilliant diplomatic career in Italy (1515–1522), the prelate and humanist Jean de Pins built this townhouse from 1528 to 1537 on a plot of over 3,000 m² near the Parlement. Comprising two lodgings and superposed galleries, it was inspired by Italy, notably breaking with the Toulouse tradition of the large stair-tower in favor of arcaded galleries and a garden. A pioneer in introducing classical orders in France, Jean de Pins had Ionic pilasters carved from a plate in Cesariano’s 1521 edition of Vitruvius published in Milan, which he likely knew during his stay there. The décor is enriched with portrait medallions celebrating the human figure and evoking ancient coins and medals collected by humanists, shield decorations and funerary stelae.

In 1542 Jean de Nolet bought the hôtel and added an arcaded street shop. He employed Nicolas Bachelier, who sculpted portrait medallions.

The opening of rue du Languedoc in the early 20th century destroyed much of the hôtel, but several vestiges were preserved and integrated into Hôtel Antonin (built 1903 on the same site) and into Hôtel Thomas de Montval (built 1904, rue Croix-Baragnon). At Hôtel Antonin, architect Joseph Thillet artificially superposed two galleries: the ground-floor one from Nolet’s phase and the upper from Jean de Pins.

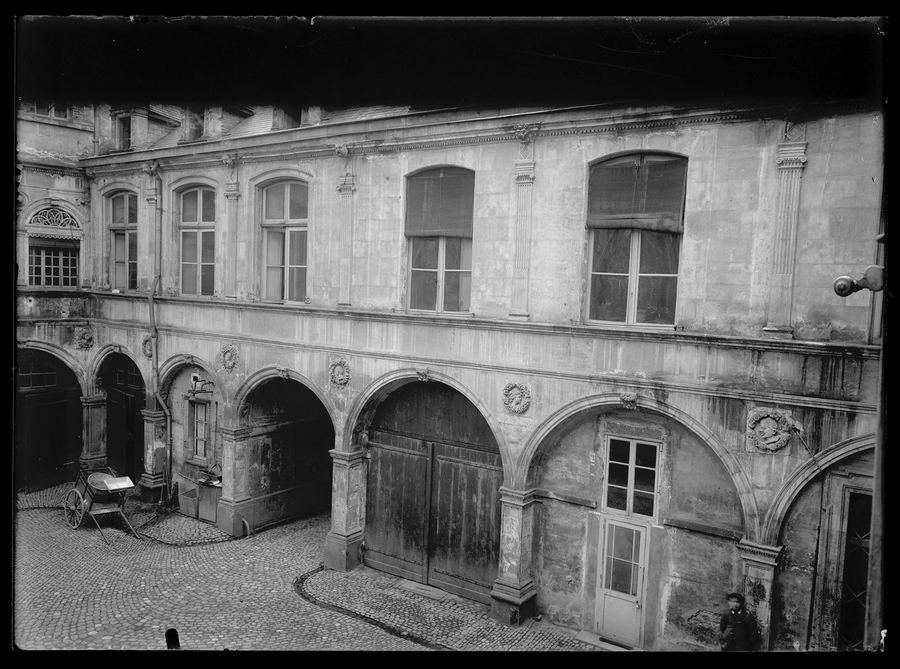
Hôtel de Pins before early-20th-century demolition.

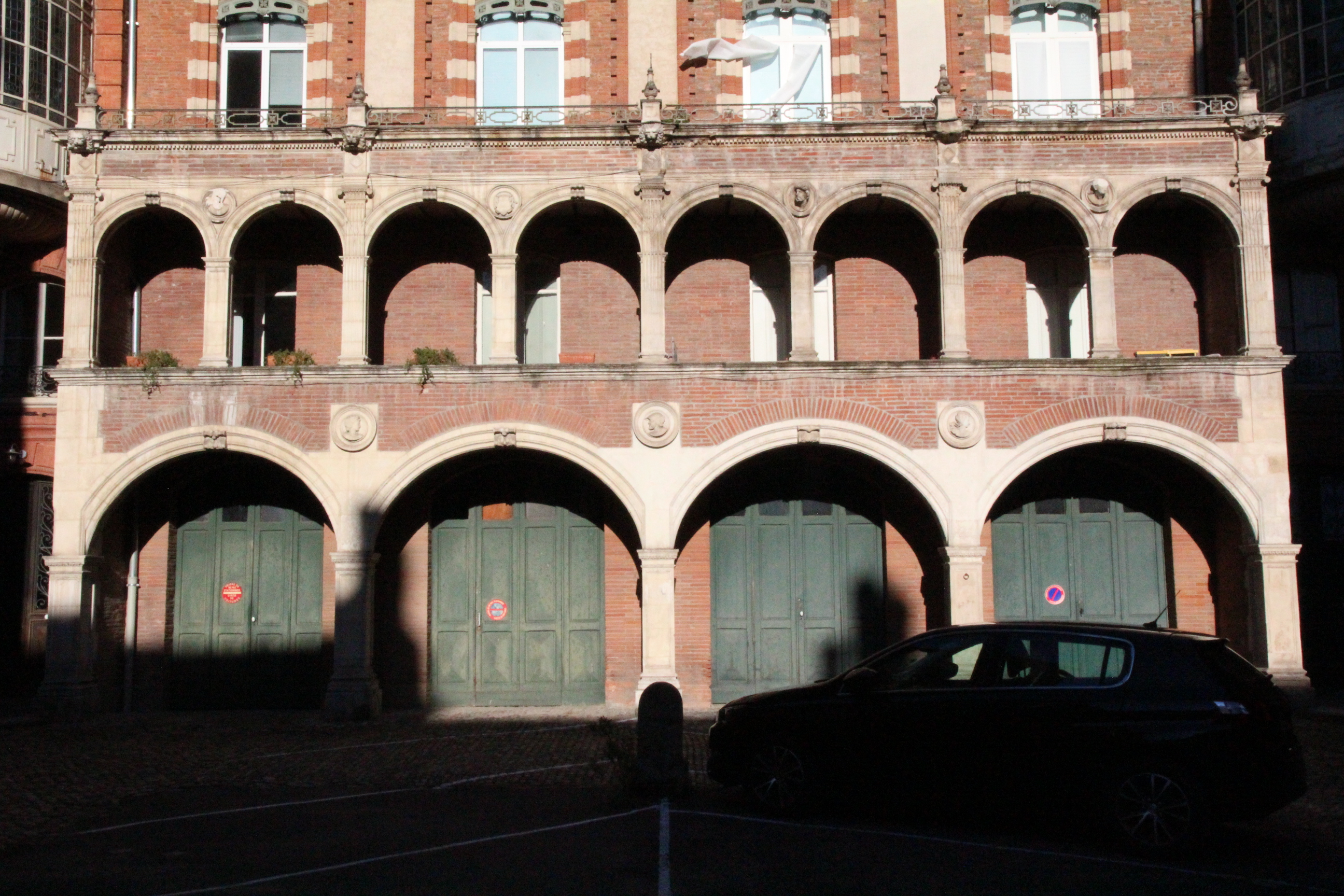
Arcades.

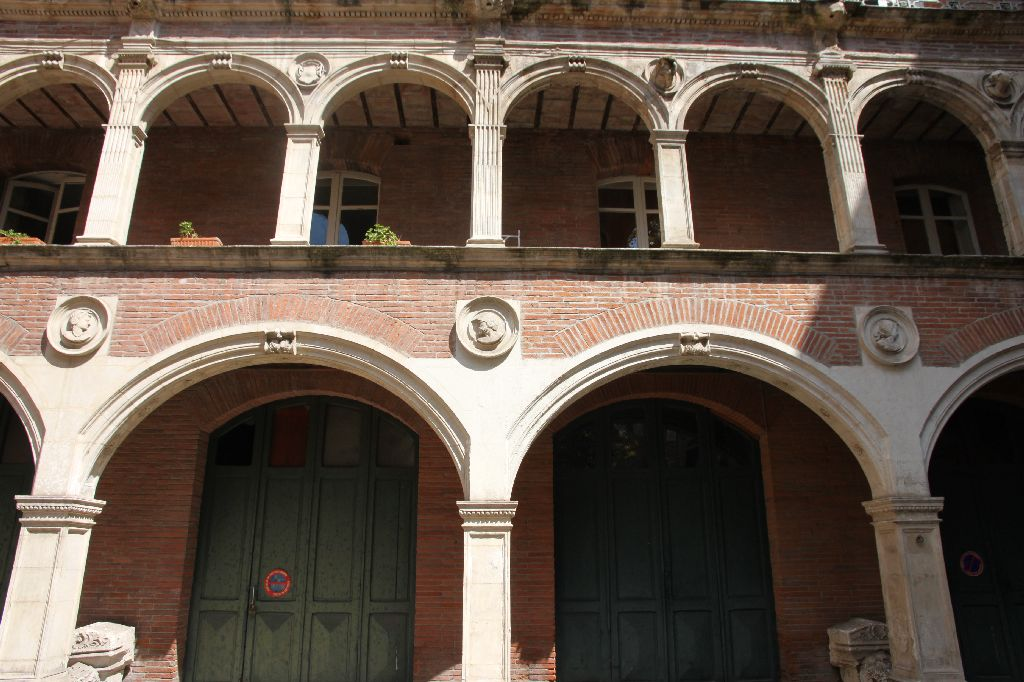
Hôtel de Pins.

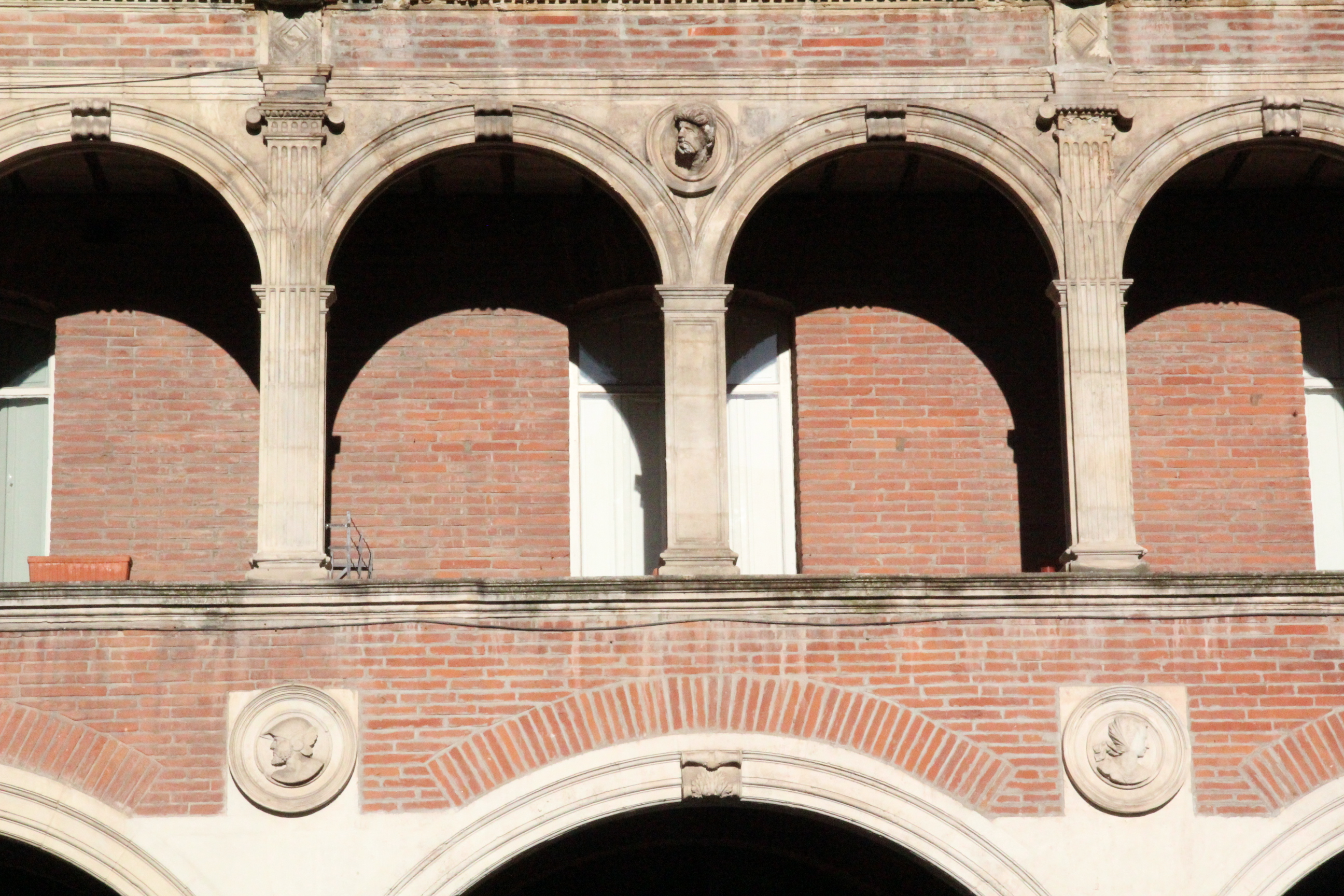
Arcades, medallions and capitals.

==== Hôtel Potier-Laterrasse ====
Address: 10 rue Théodore-Ozenne.

Integrated into a later building survive superposed arcades (late 16th or early 17th c.). On the fluted pilasters of the façade, superposed Doric and Ionic orders.

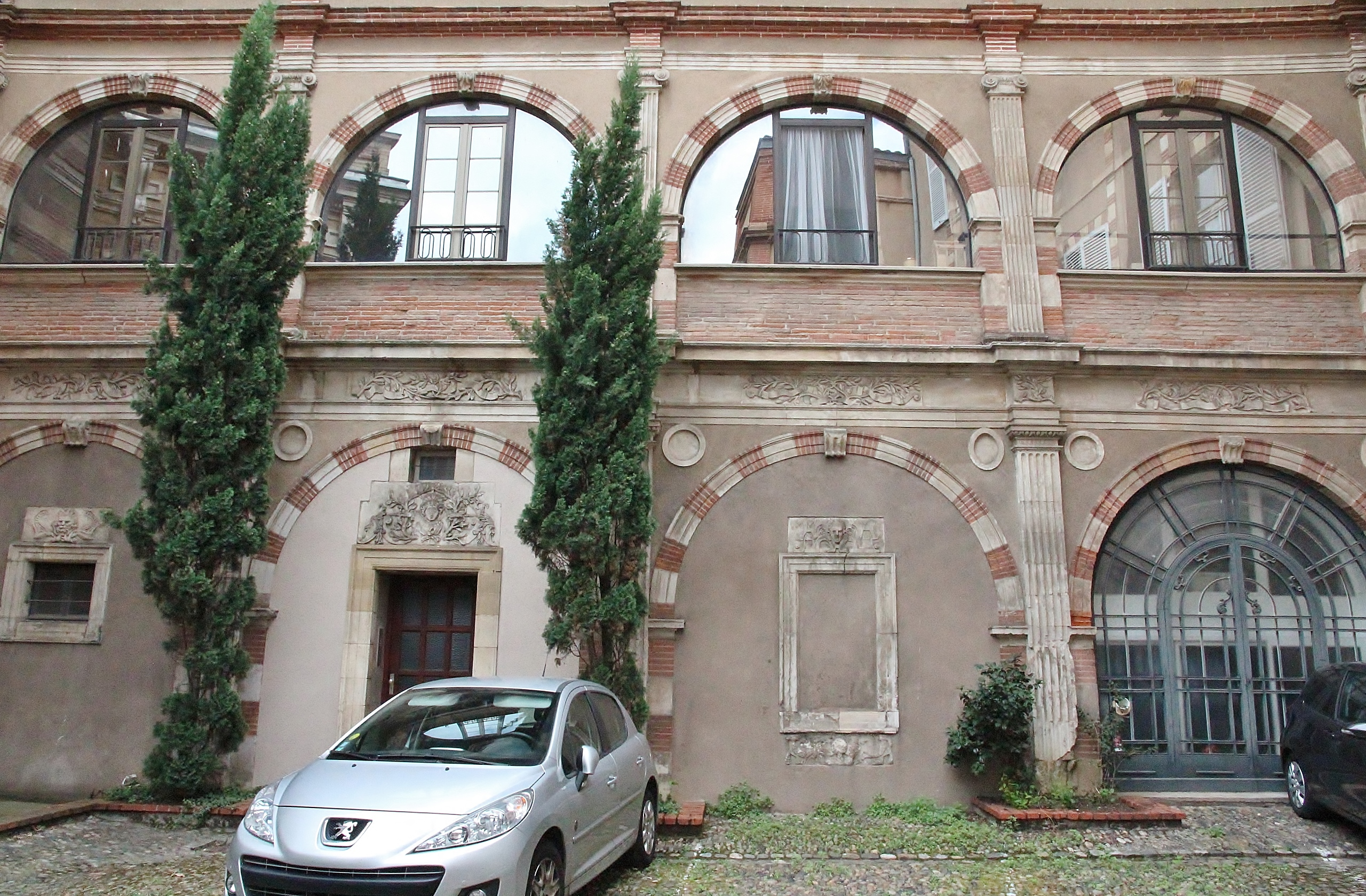
Hôtel Potier-Laterrasse.

==== Hôtel Thomas de Montval ====
Address: 22 rue Croix-Baragnon.

Built 1901–1904 by architect Jules Calbairac for Paul-Marius Thomas, using spolia of Renaissance arcades from Hôtel de Pins plus six medallions by Nicolas Bachelier.

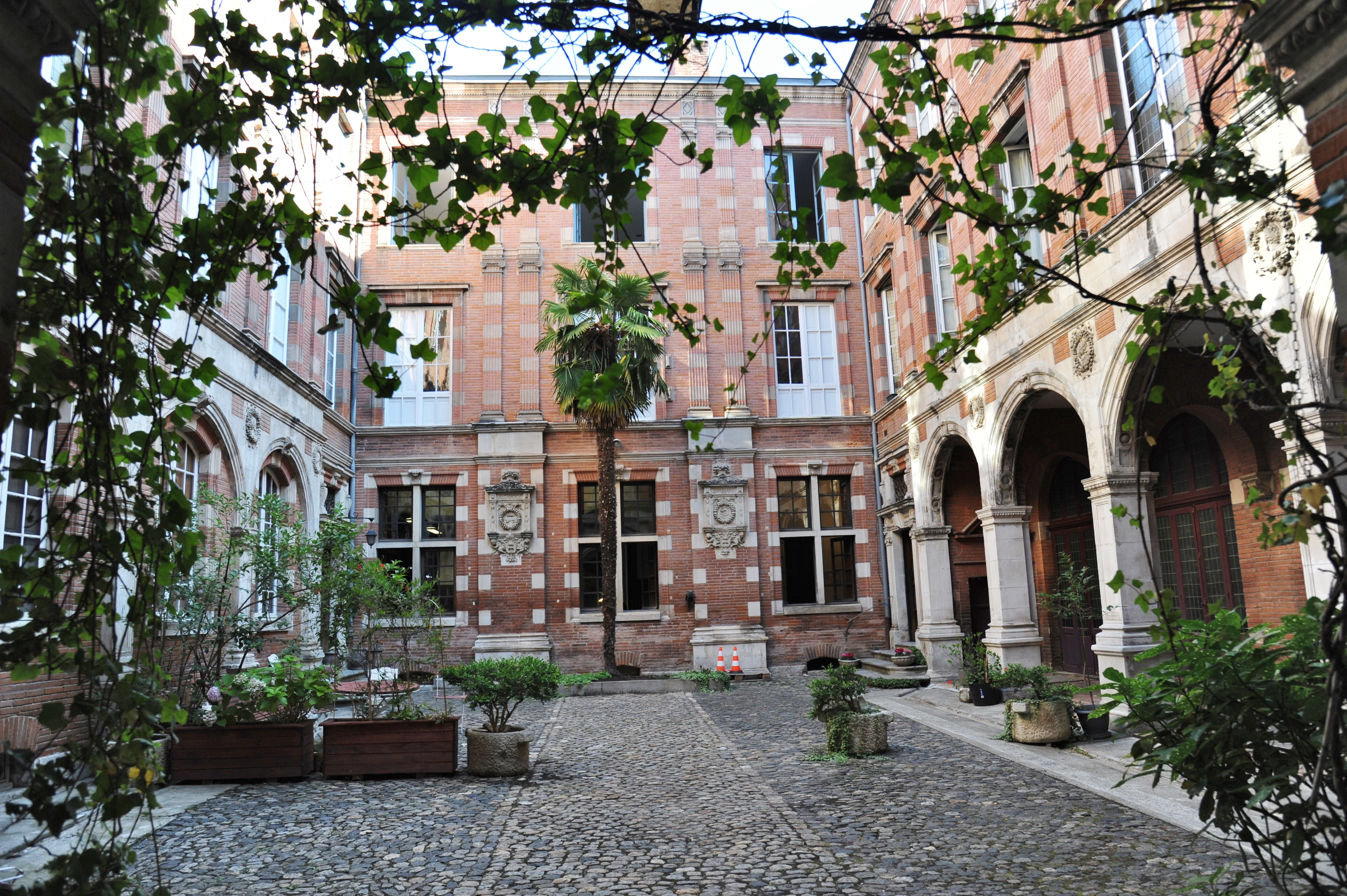
Court.

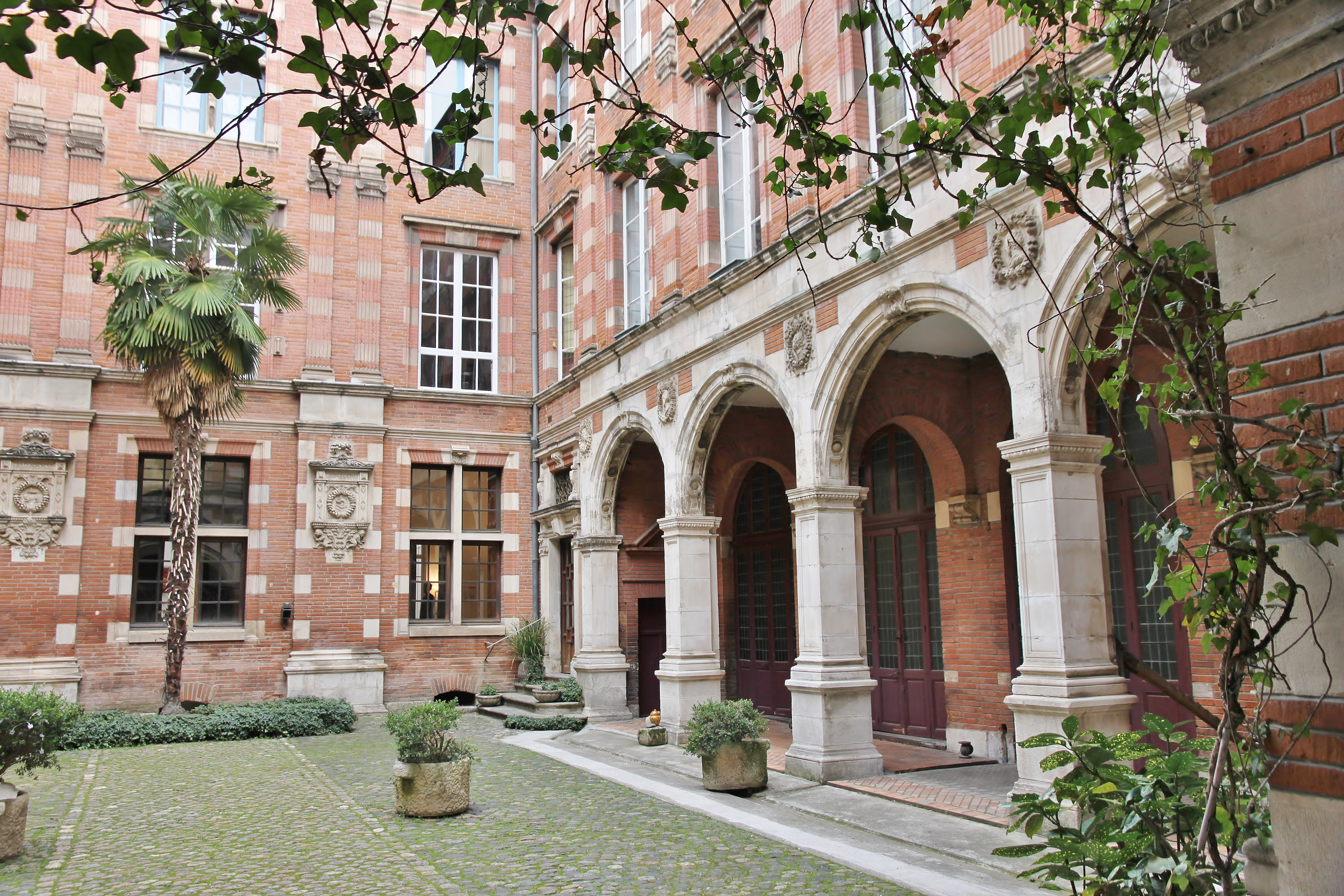
Court.

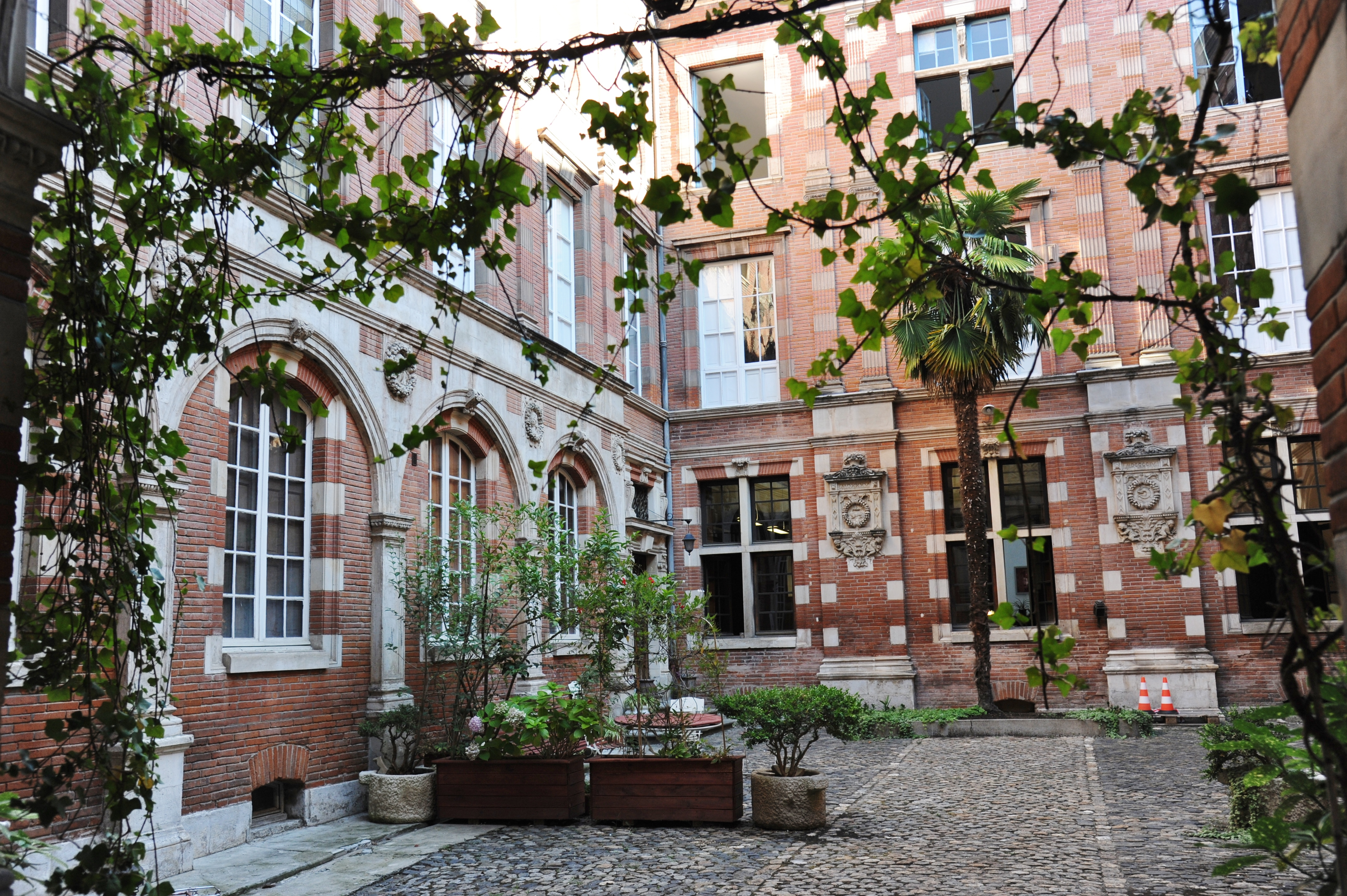
Court.

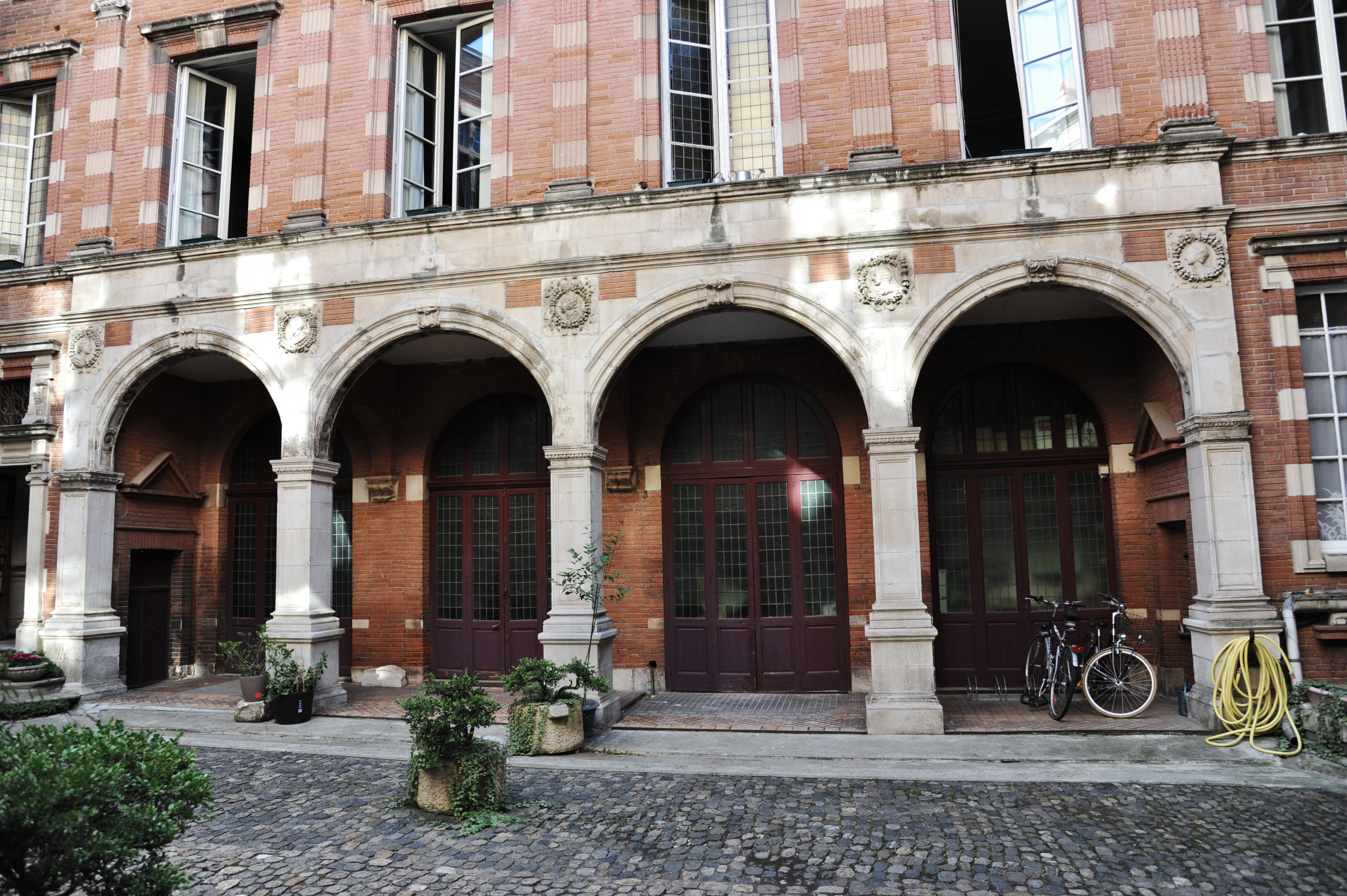
Arcades and Renaissance medallions.

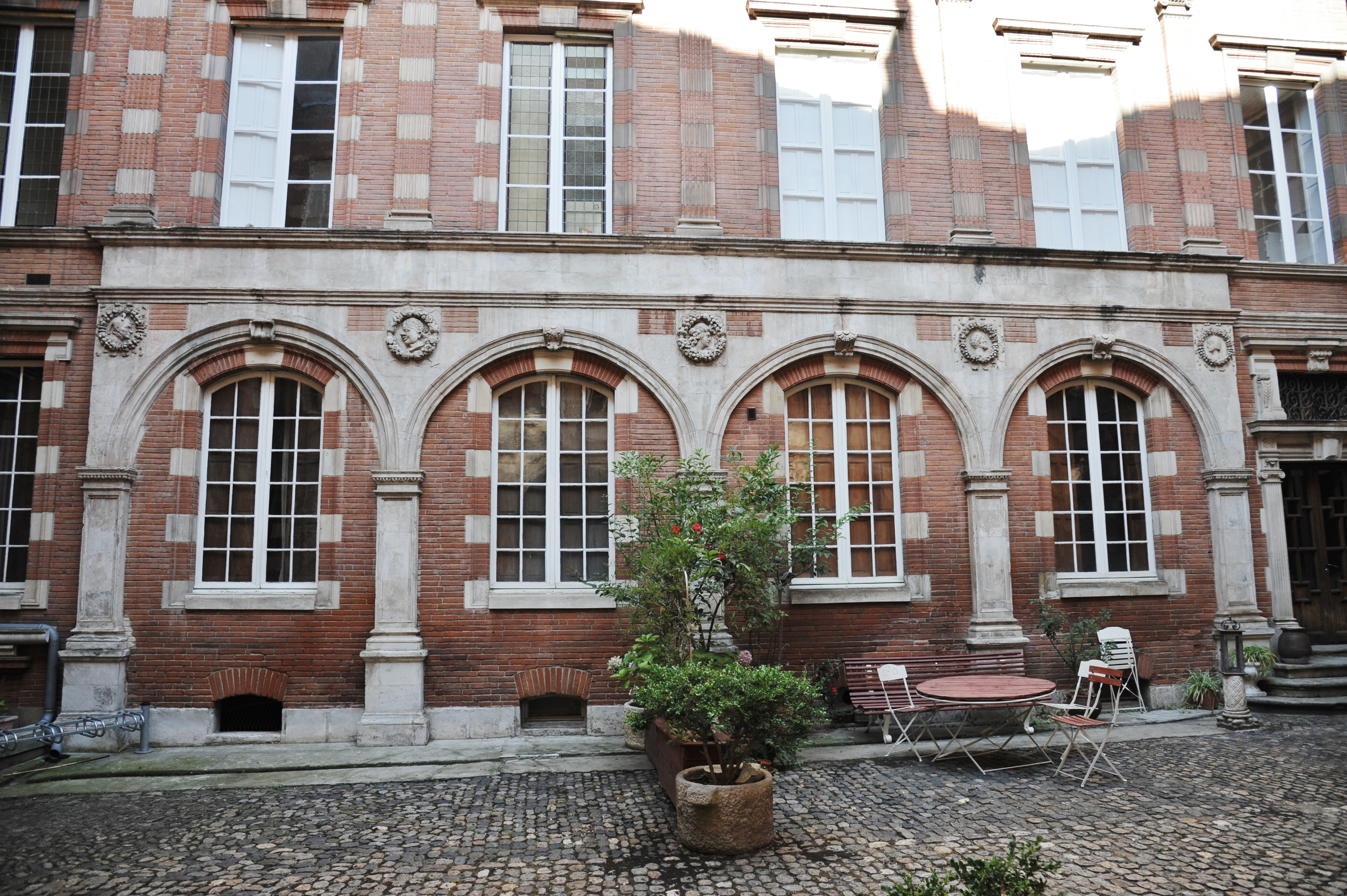
Arcades and Renaissance medallions.

==== Hôtel d’Ulmo ====
Address: 15 rue Ninau.

Jean d’Ulmo, président à mortier at the Parlement, built 1526–1536 the first straight-flight stair in Toulouse, opening at each level to the two parts of the apartment. On the top floor is a vault with classical pilasters, emblematic of French solutions where artists assimilated the Renaissance vocabulary yet kept the great tradition of learned vaults “ennobling and marking a sign of eternity”.

The marble-and-stone porch in the court is probably 17th-century, possibly modeled on a 16th-century canopy then in the Parlement’s court.

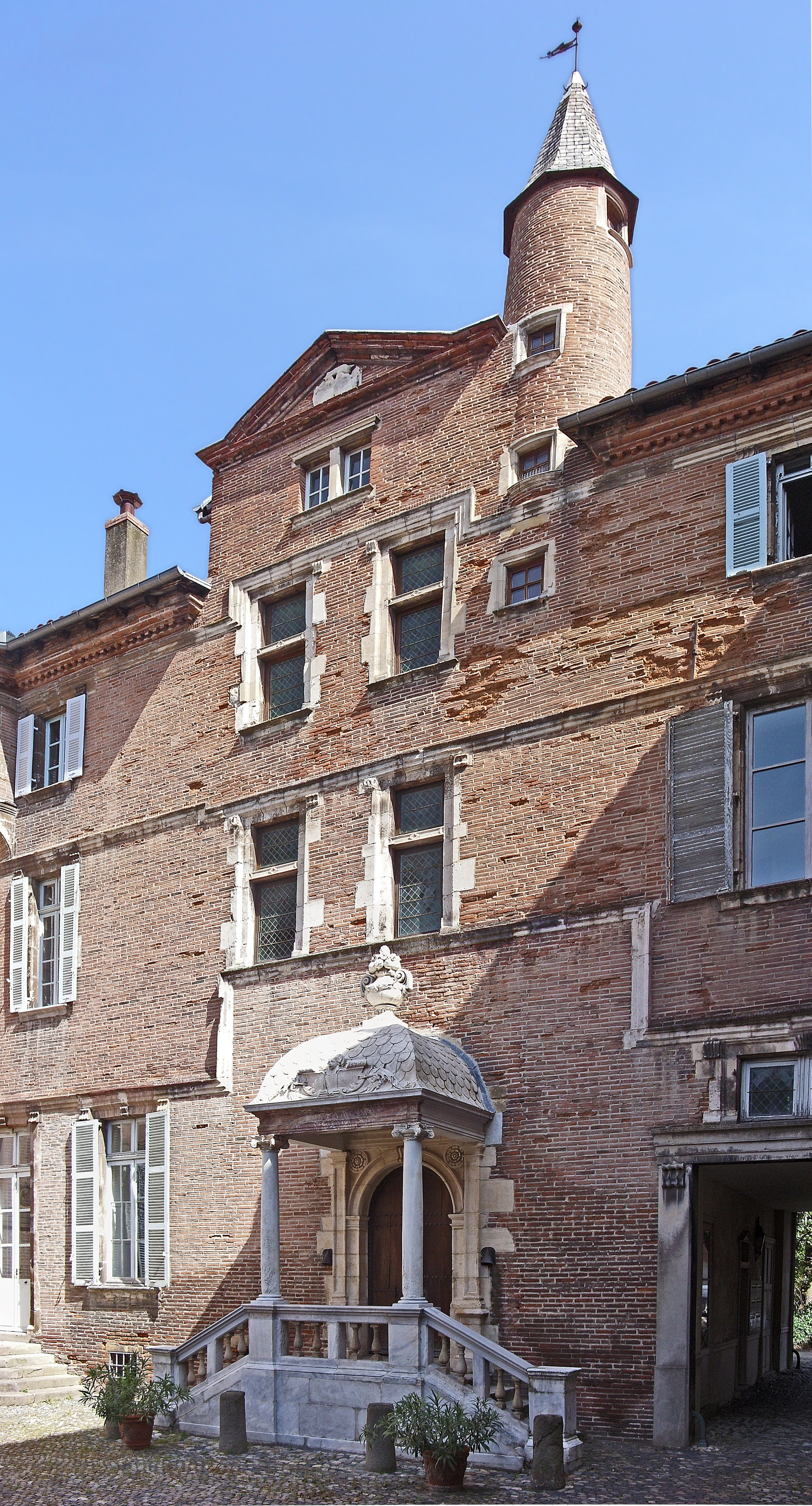
Court.

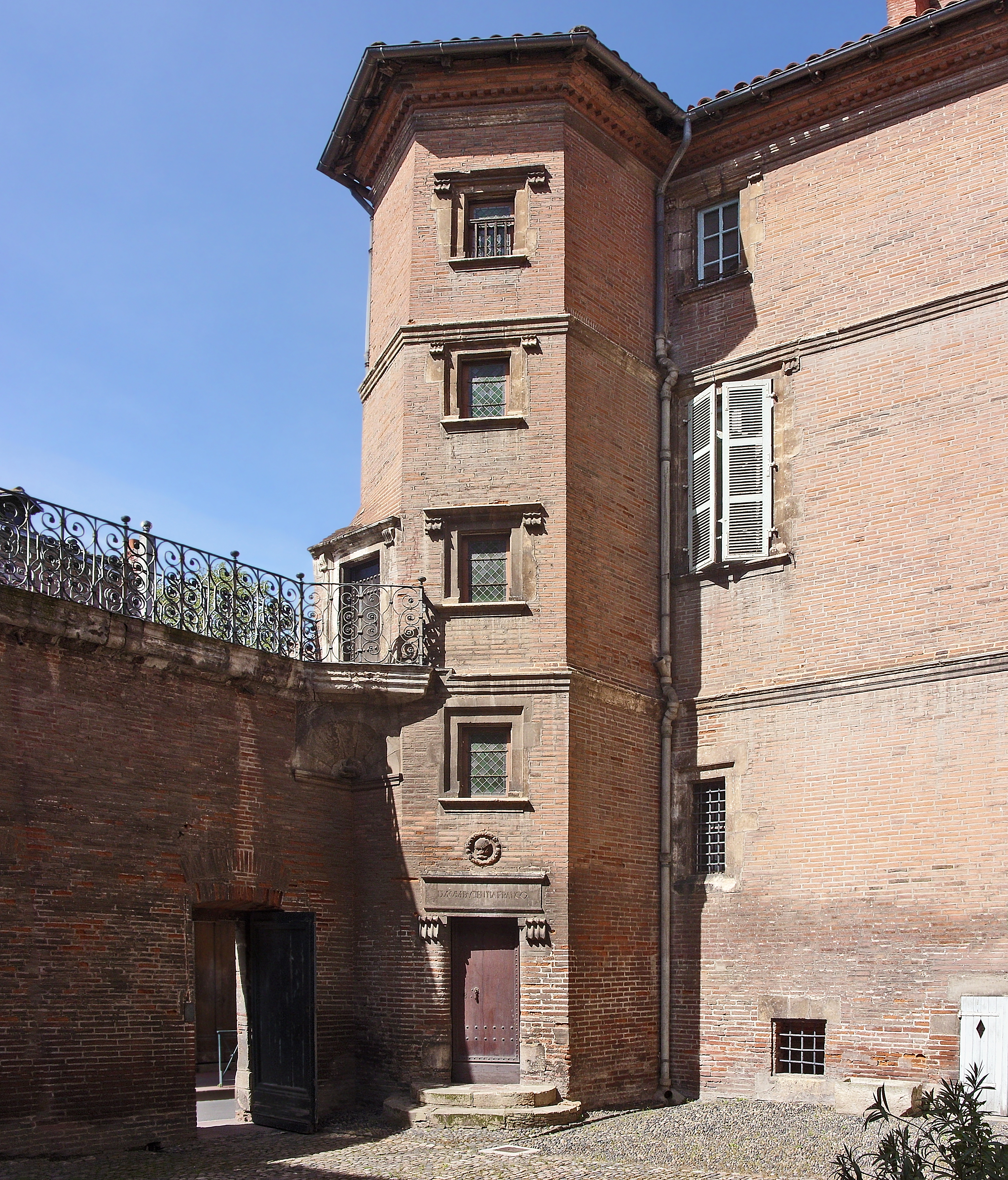
Lateral stair-tower.

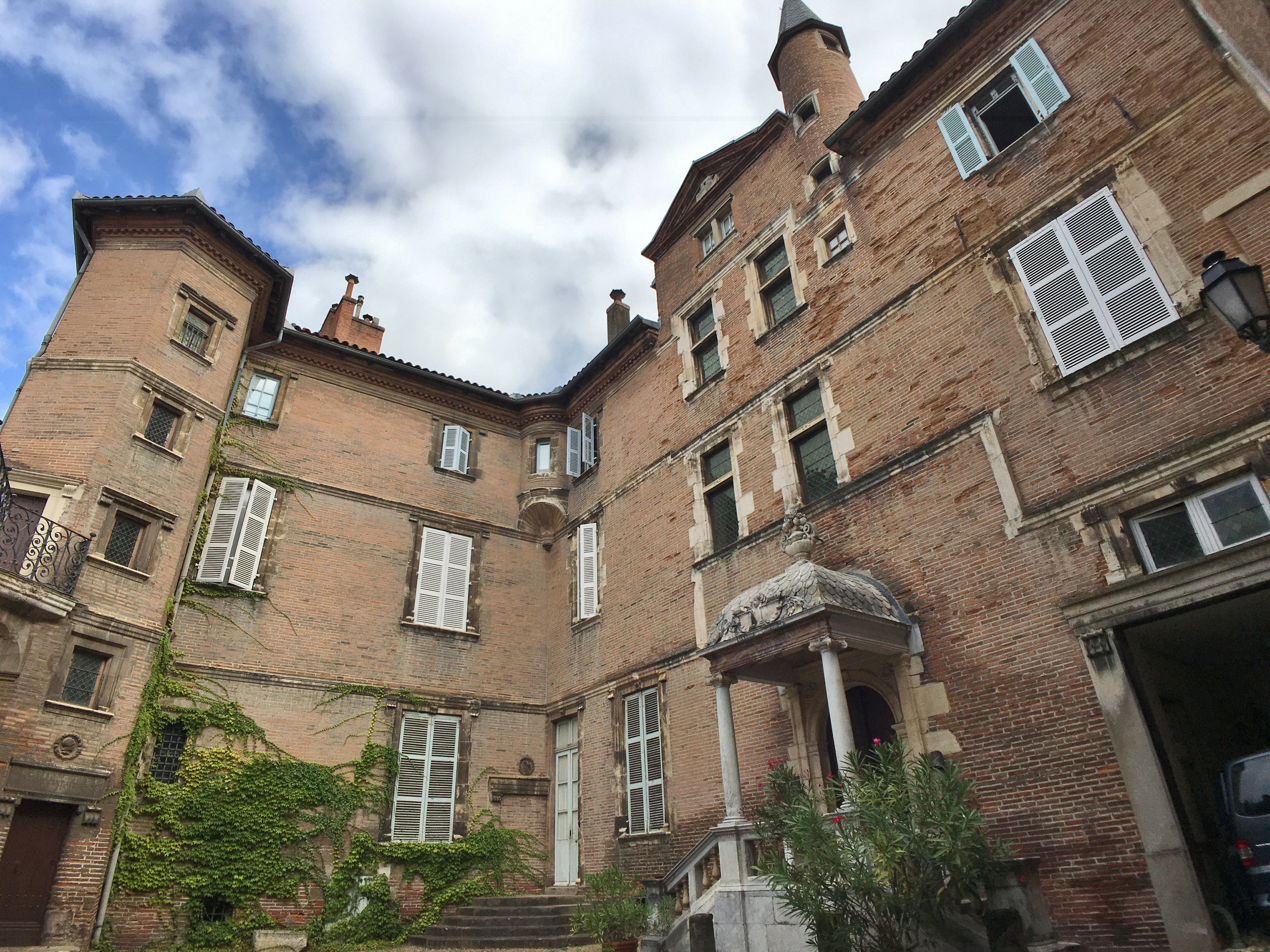
Court façades.

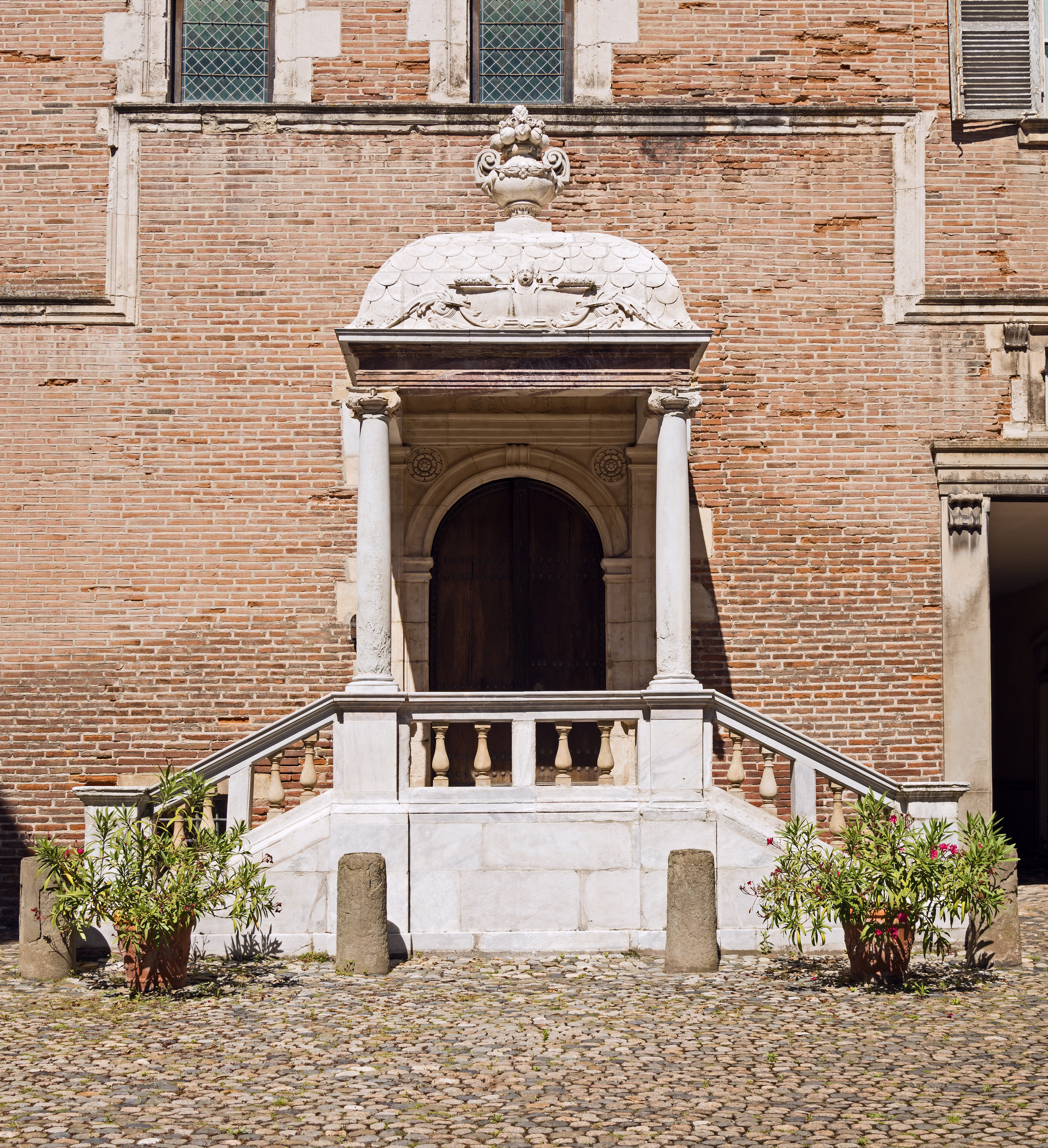
White-marble canopy.

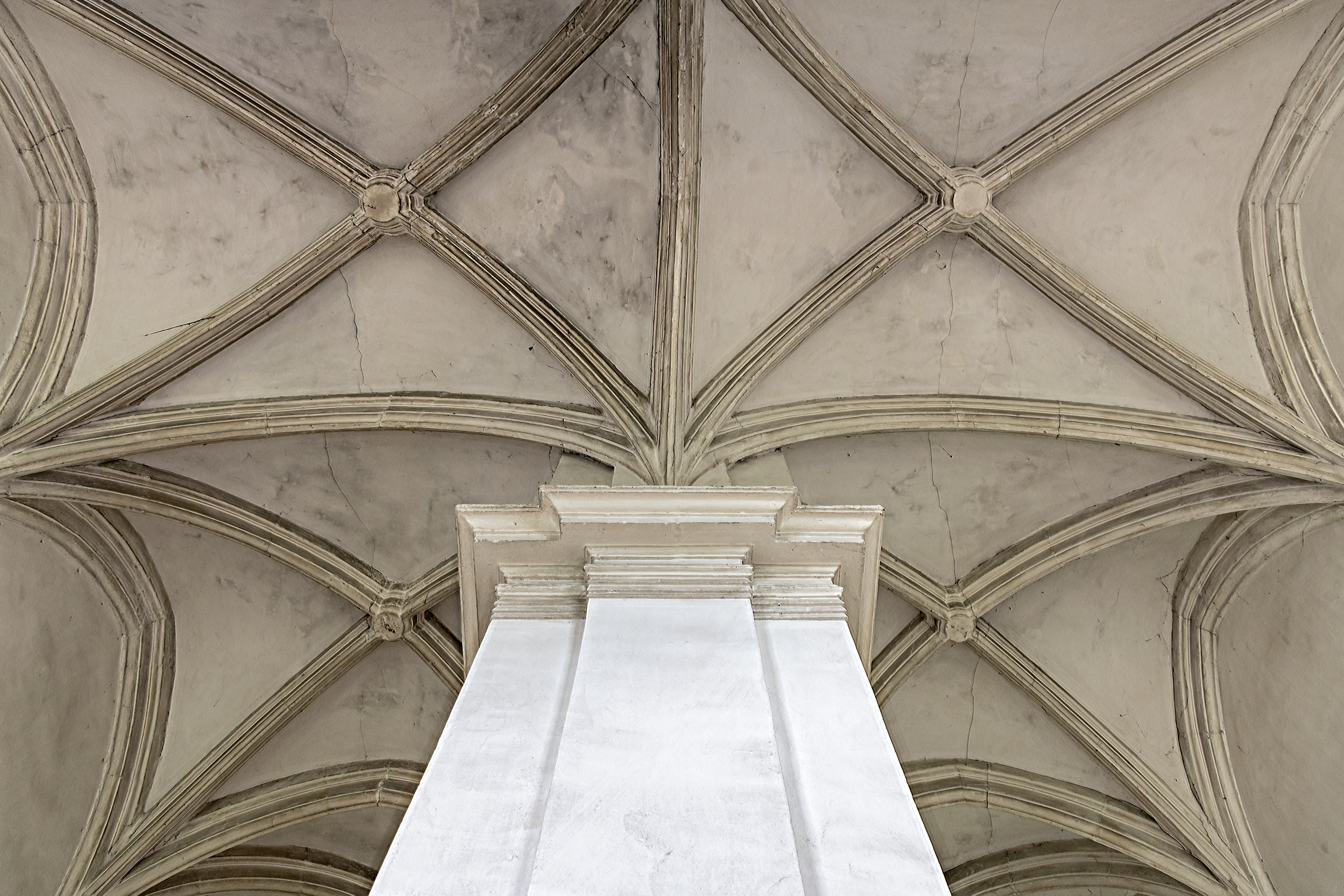
Ribbed-vault ceiling of the main stair.

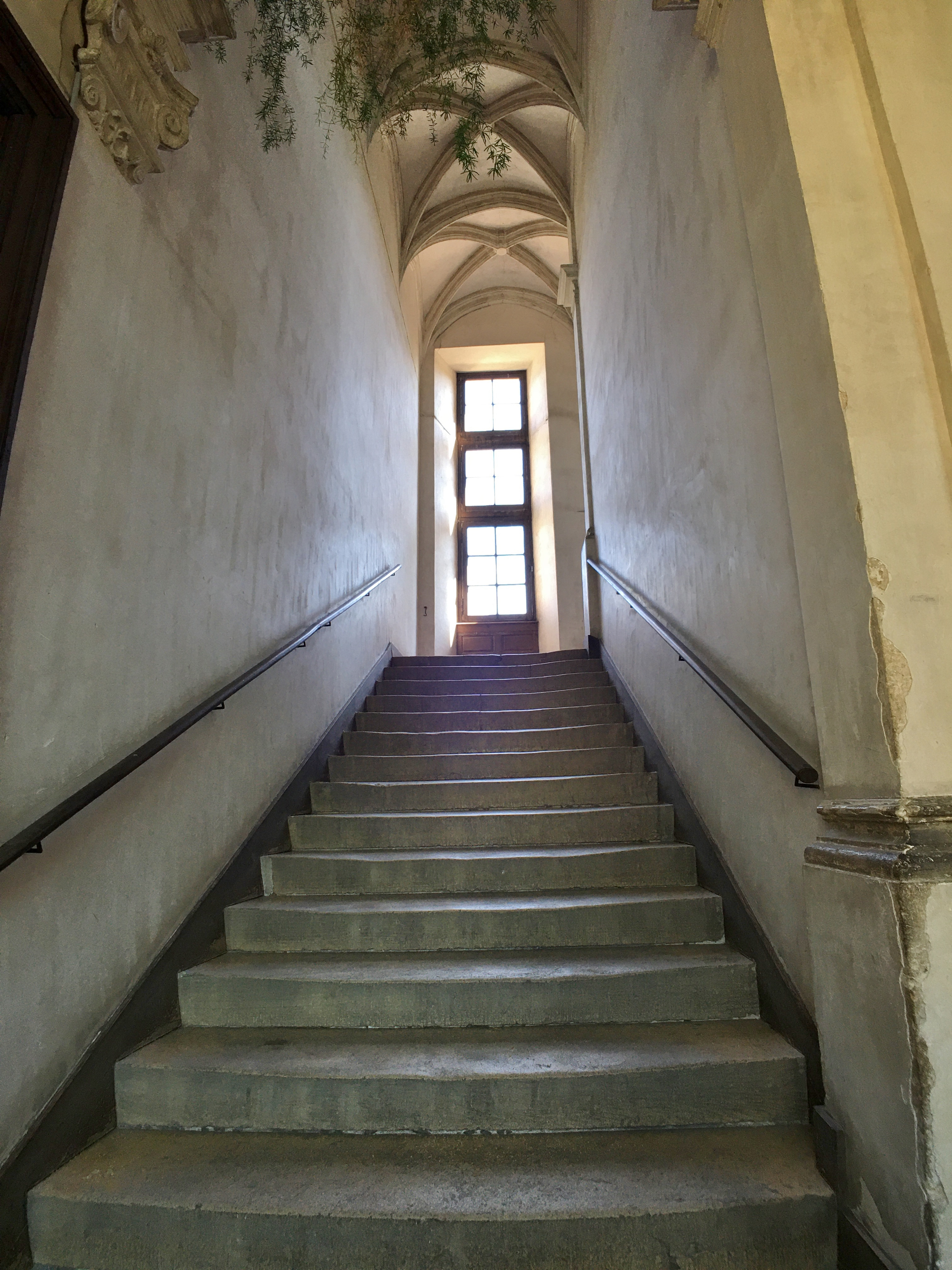
First straight stair in Toulouse.

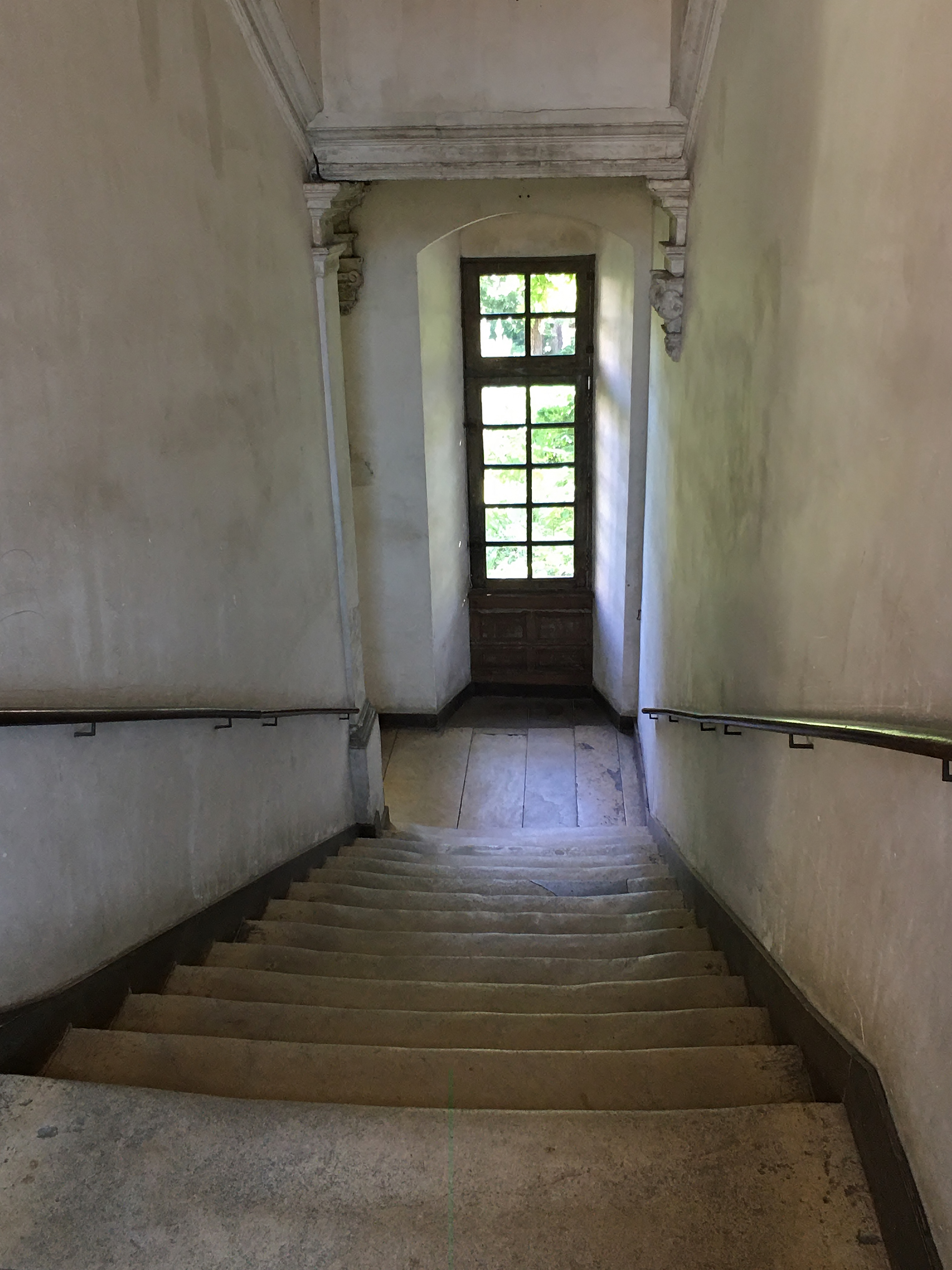
Stair.

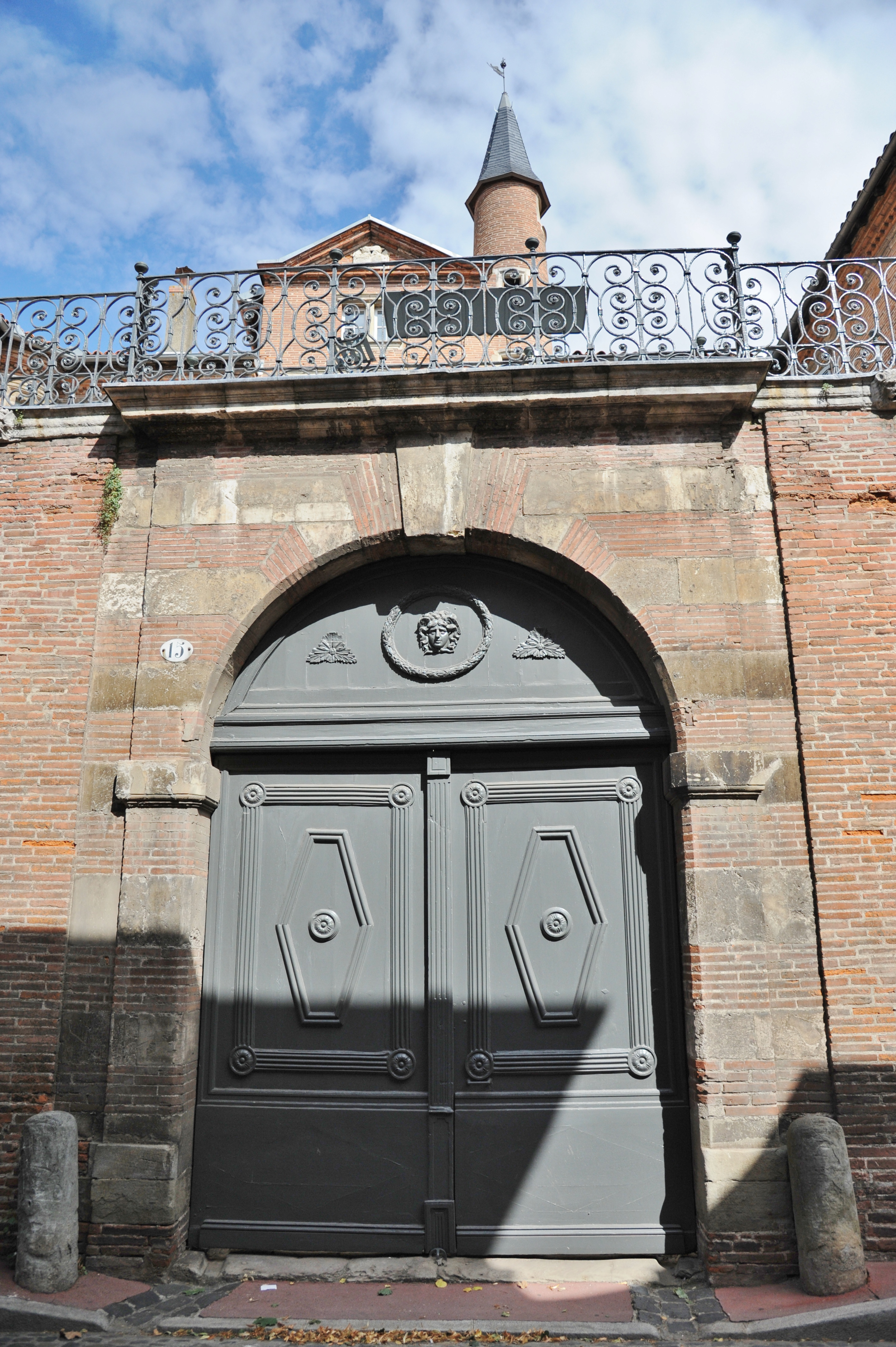
Portal.

==== Hôtel du Vieux-Raisin ====
Address: 36 rue du Languedoc.

This hôtel with magnificent Renaissance windows underwent several phases through the 16th century; attributions remain debated.

In 1515, jurist and capitoul Béringuier Maynier acquired a 15th-century hôtel. On a new lodging flanked by two stair-towers extended by two short wings, he installed numerous windows richly ornamented with pilasters, candelabra and scrollwork. Bust medallions decorate the large stair-tower. Inside, a display fireplace celebrates the owner’s humanist culture, its décor an apology of fortune, abundance and fertility.

In 1547, parlementary counselor Jean de Burnet acquired the house. Between 1547 and 1577 he enlarged the honor court, giving it a square shape by extending the wings, and closed it with a portico whose Doric columns and brick-and-stone alternation were inspired by Assézat’s loggia.

Between 1580 and 1591, Bishop Pierre de Lancrau, then owner, raised the large stair-tower and added several windows with atlantes.

In the court, some first-floor windows with atlantes may date to the second phase and be by Nicolas Bachelier; those at ground floor would be from the third phase (late 16th c.). The atlantes and caryatids show remarkable diversity and realism: upstairs, strained musculature bears the entablature; on the ground floor, hybrid figures with lion paws or pilasters display great anatomical and psychological realism. Other carved motifs in the frames reference royal edifices like the Galerie of king Francis I and sometimes take inspiration from works by Benvenuto Cellini and Michelangelo.

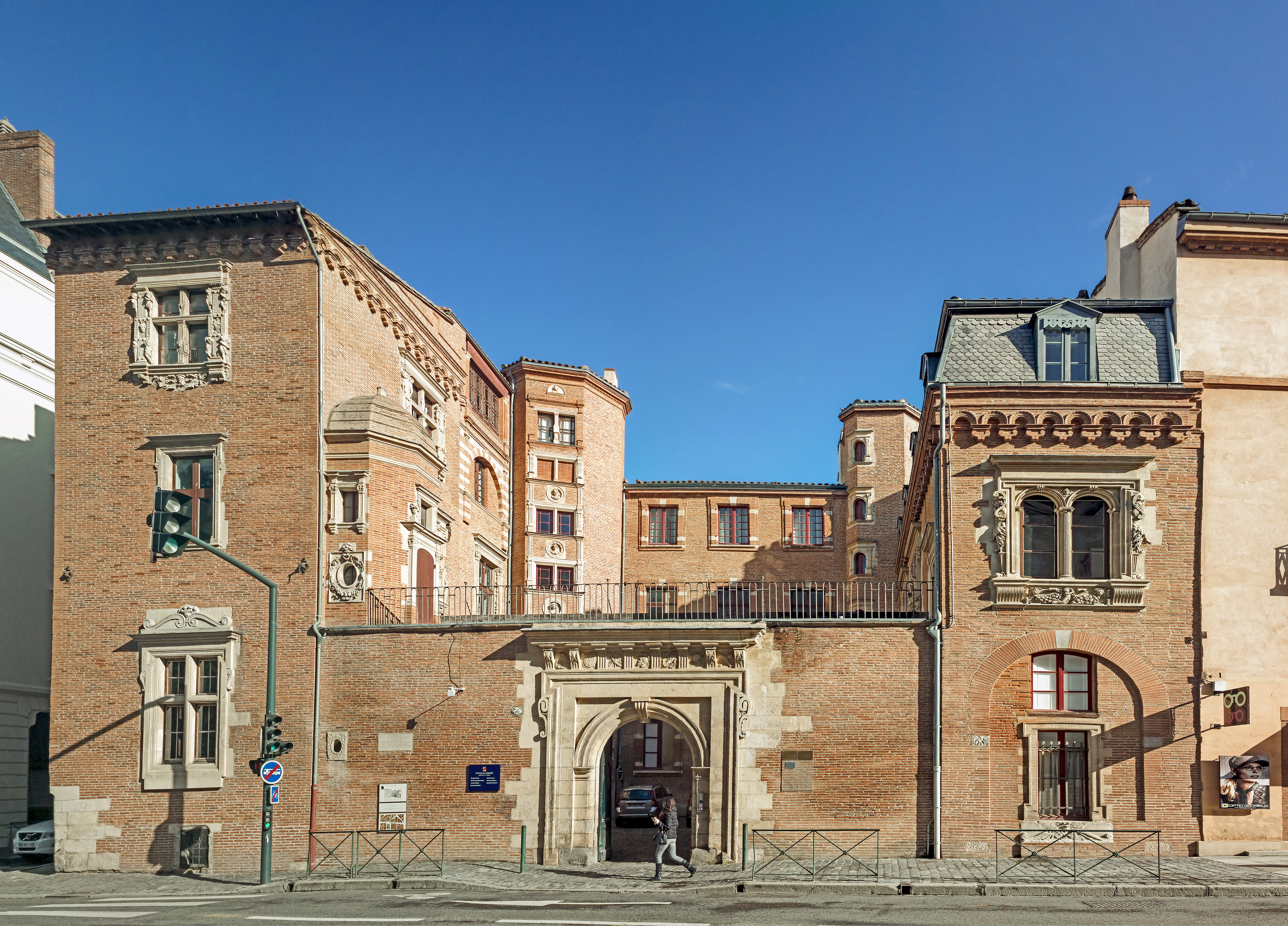
Hôtel du Vieux-Raisin.

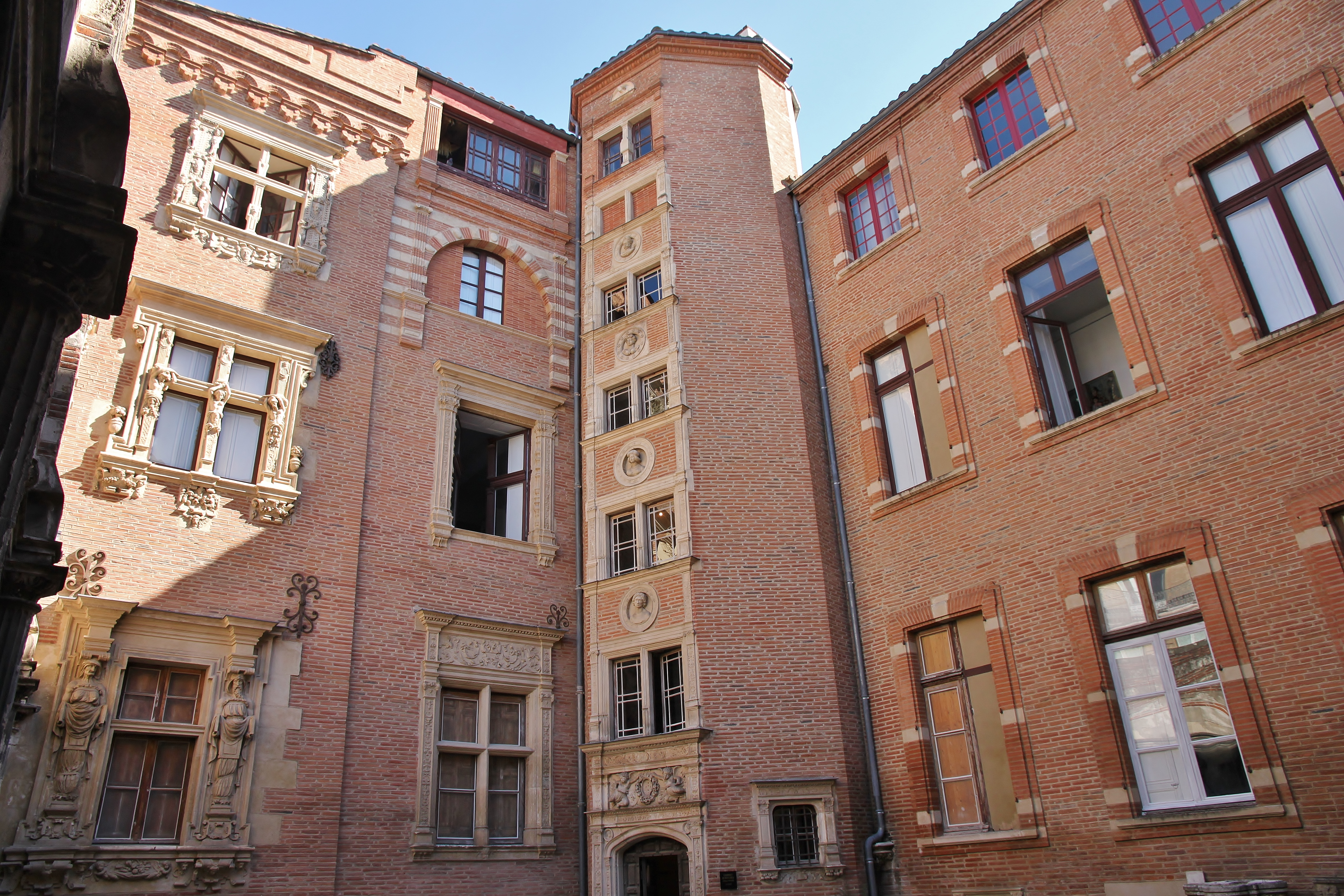
View.

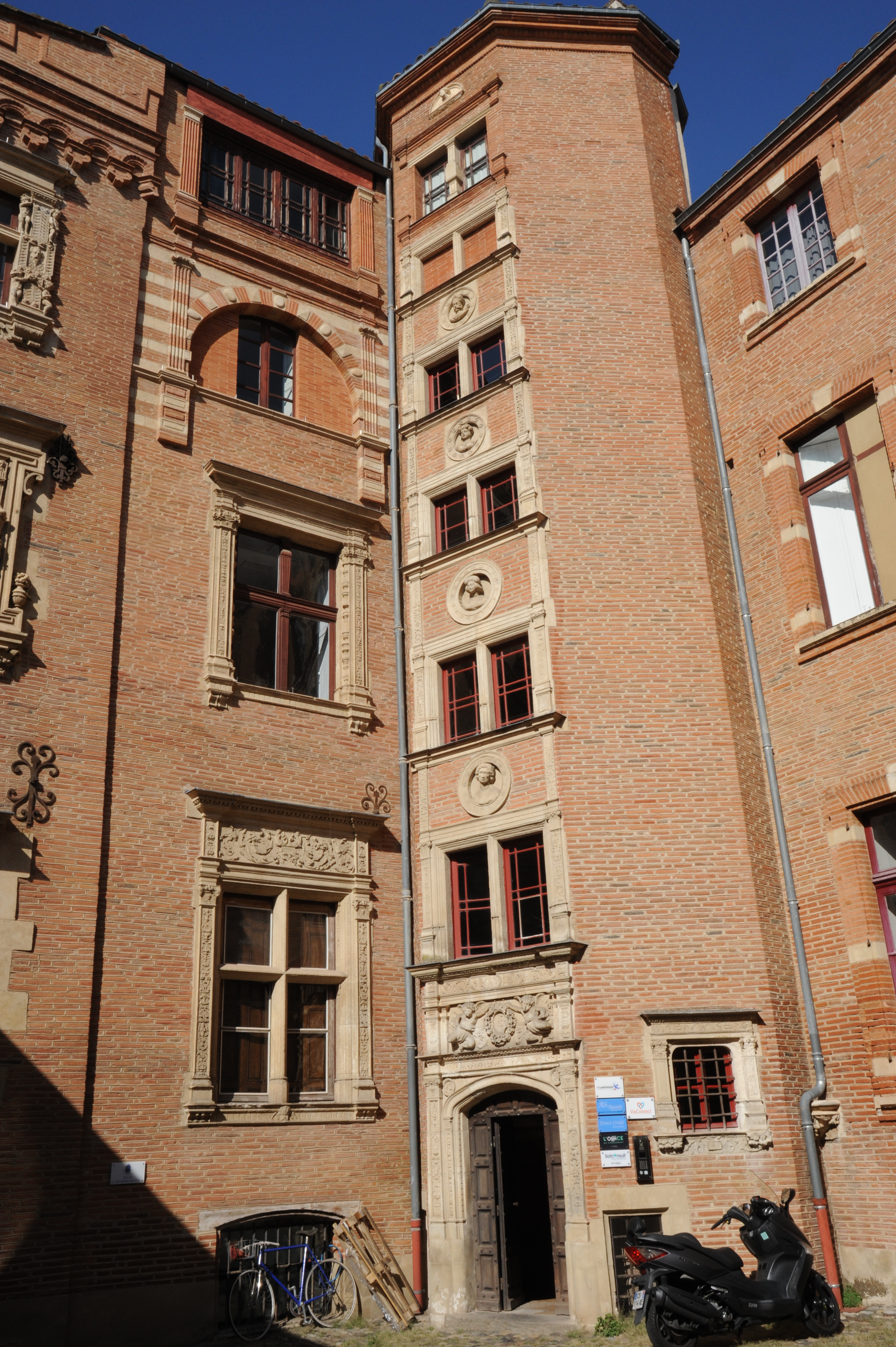
Large stair-tower.

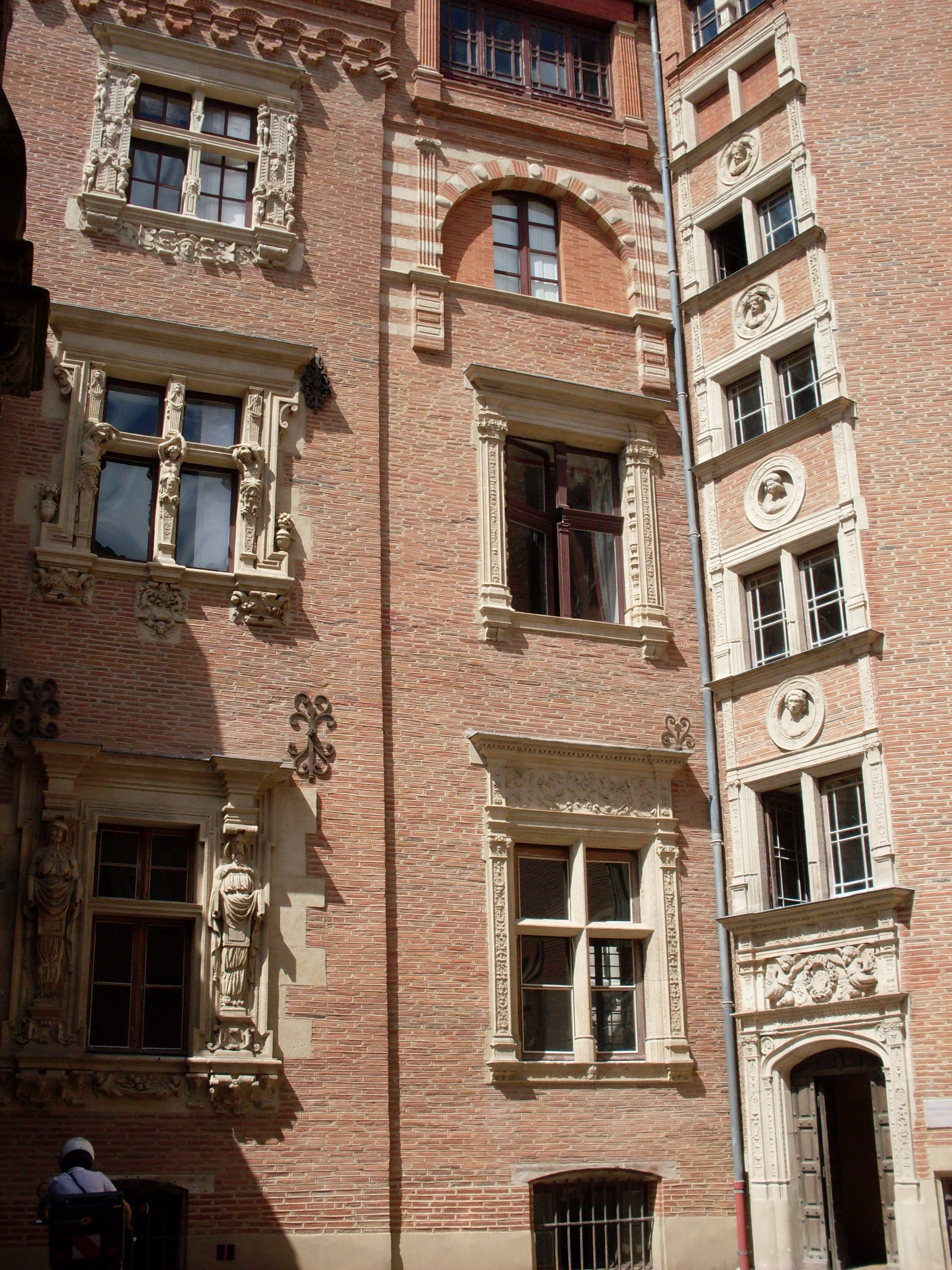
View.

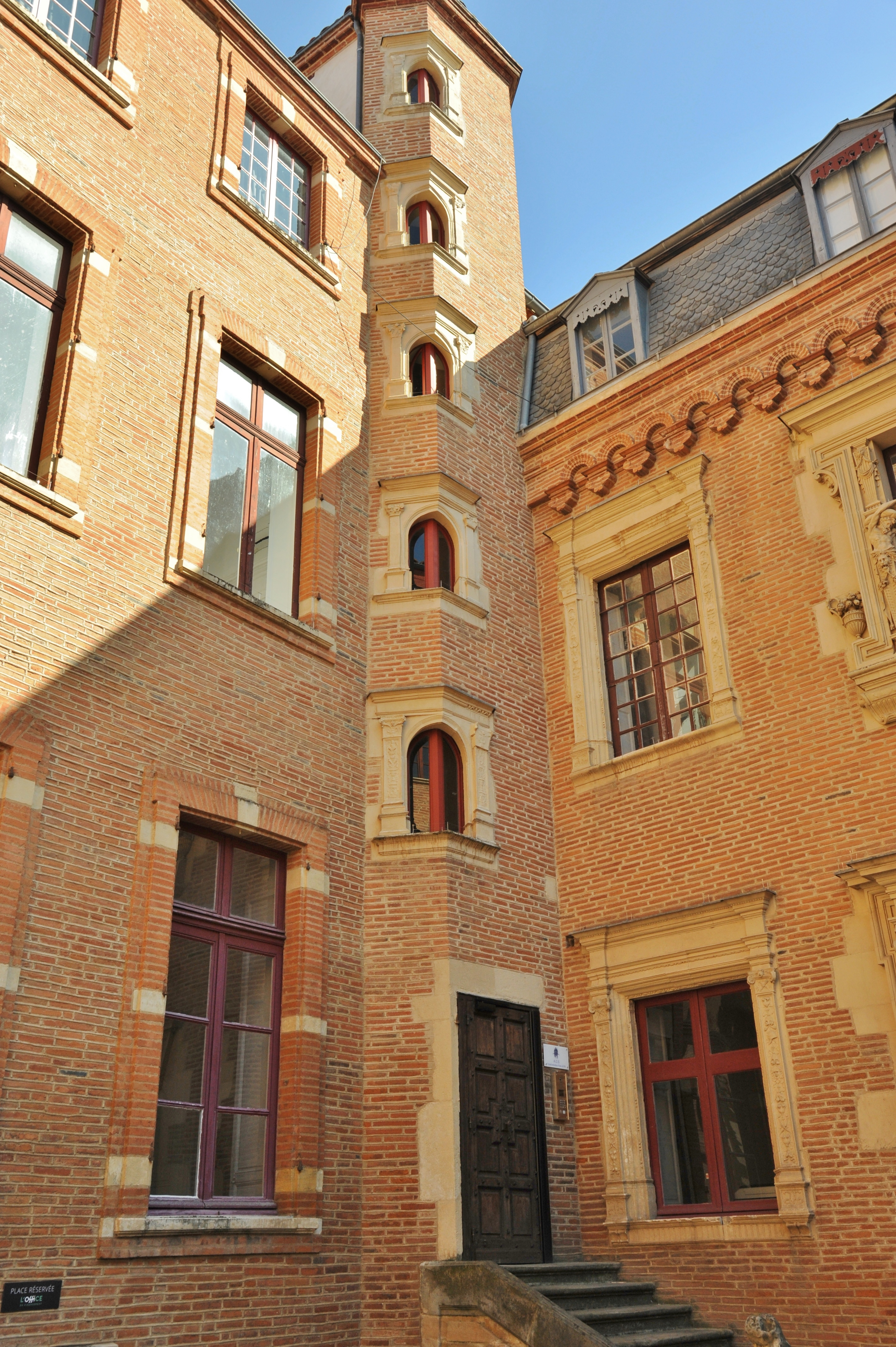
Second stair-tower.

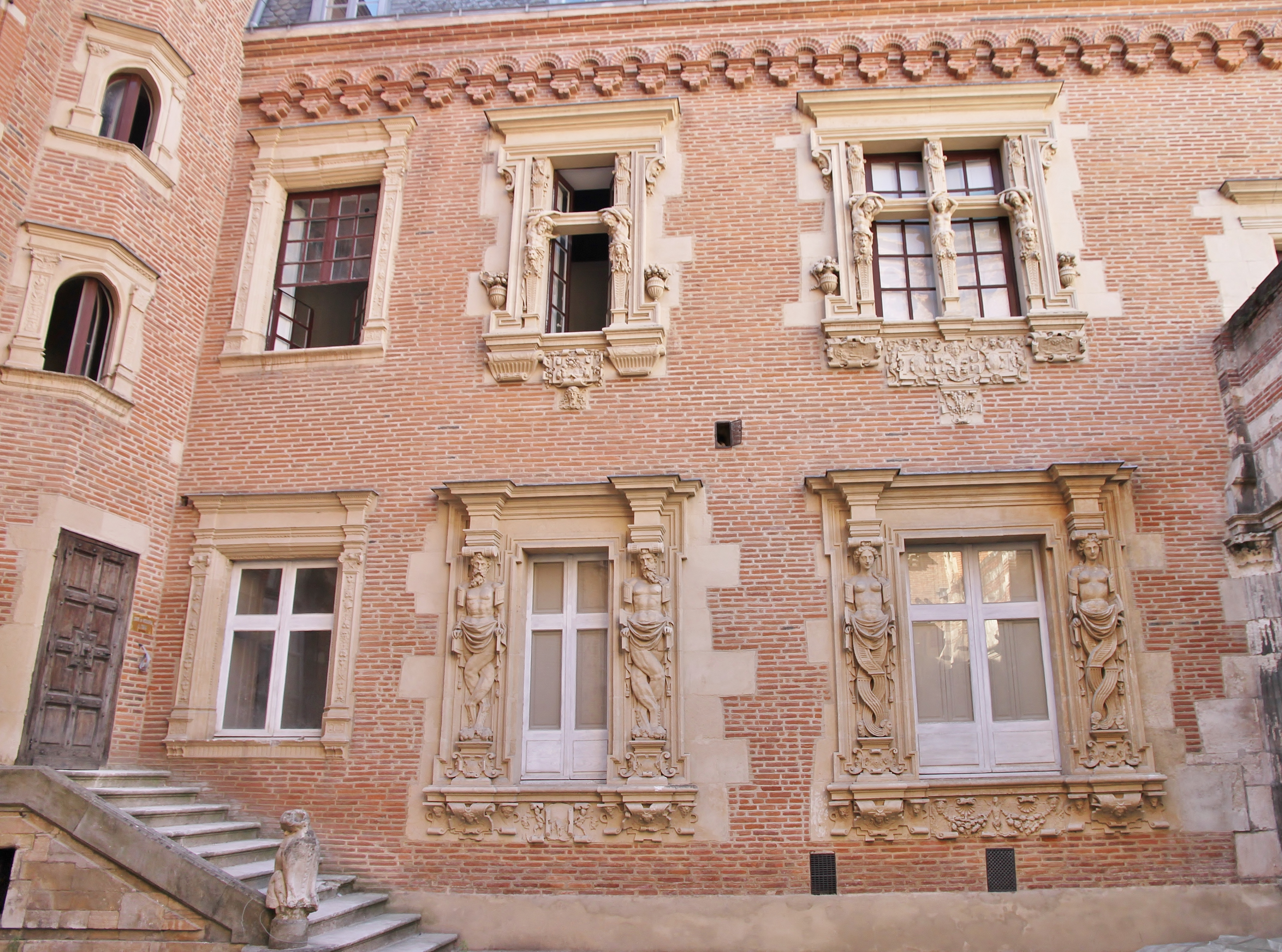
View.

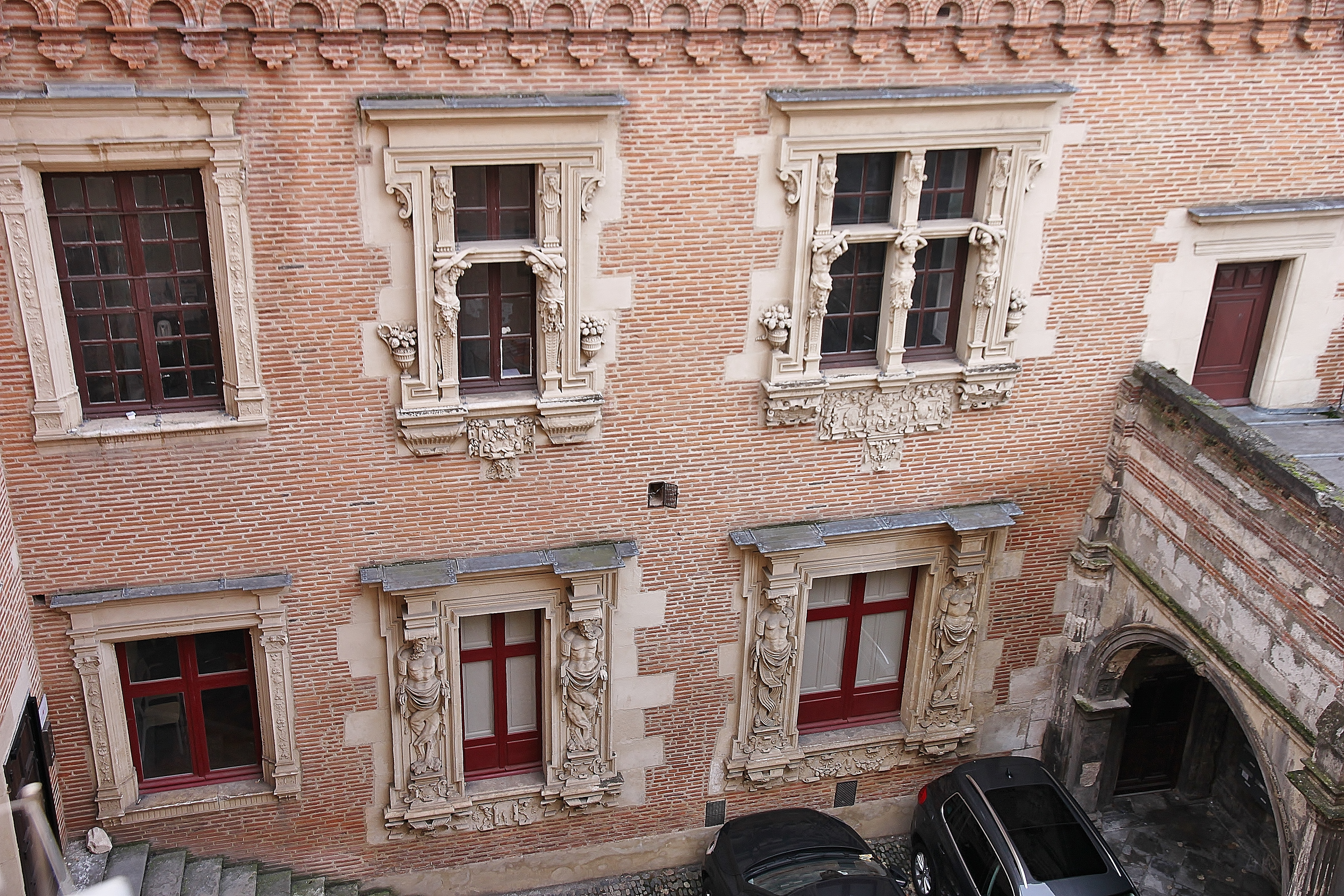
View.

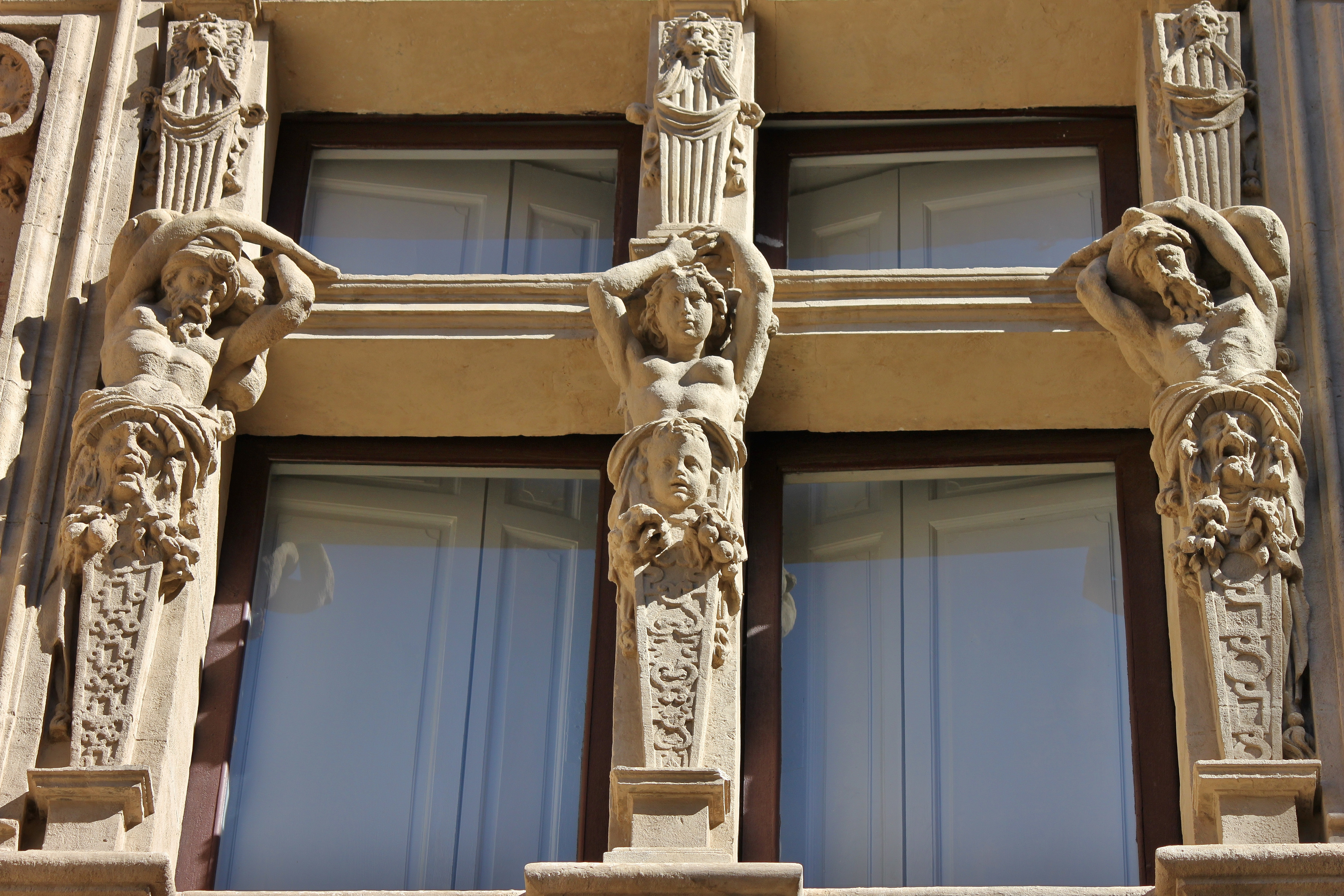
Window.

== Gates and windows ==
Gates and windows are presented below in an approximate chronological order, as far as possible.

=== Doors and portals ===
Preferred communication media for private or institutional owners who wished to display their importance, doors and portals were generally the object of all decorative care. The great diversity of Renaissance doors and portals in Toulouse reveals a multitude of sources and influences testifying to more than a century of Renaissance architecture.

Among the first doors of the Toulouse Renaissance, the door of the stair tower of the Hôtel du Vieux-Raisin (1515–1528) displays the profiles of the owner and his wife, represented in a medallion, and is enriched with a Latin motto within a décor of putti and scrolls. The decoration on the door of the Tournoer Tower (1532) depicts a funerary urn framed by two lions facing each other, in memory of the owner's son who died shortly before.

The portal of the Dalbade church was made by the stonemason Michel Colin. For the lower part (1537–1539) he was inspired by the Loire Valley, but the construction took place at a pivotal time when the style of thfcountere French First Renaissance faded in the face of architectural orders. Also for the upper part, built from 1540 onwards, classical columns and capitals replaced the composite and figured capitals or the scrolls, giving the portal a more monumental style.

The dating of the portal with telamons in the courtyard of the Hôtel de Bagis, an emblematic work of the Toulouse Renaissance, is still debated for lack of documentary sources. Initially associated with the campaign of Nicolas Bachelier (1538) and then with the 1545s because of its resemblance to a 1539 engraving of Serlio's "Regole generali", it has also been attributed to the workshop of Pierre Souffron (around 1606) because of the renovation of the perron and the upheaval of the courtyard of honour at that time. More recently the decade 1550 has been proposed because elements (base and sheath of the telamons, anatomical treatment...) are similar to mantelpieces of the Madrid Castle sculpted after 1540, engravings of which were circulated by Androuet du Cerceau in the 1550s.

The many doors of the former town hall, a complex of buildings built mainly in the 16th and 17th centuries, were an opportunity for the capitouls to leave a trace of their time at the head of the municipal administration. Their short one-year term of office did not usually encourage them to embark on large-scale projects on which they could not have had their coats of arms carved (the monumental facade, the Henri IV courtyard and the Archive tower are exceptions in this respect), but the doors could be made in this period of time by a skilled craftsman with all the desired ornamentation and, above all, with room for the coats of arms of the sitting consuls. Only a few examples of these doors of the Capitole have survived, and they suffered both from revolutionary censorship (destruction of coats of arms) and from a 19th century that saw the almost total reconstruction of the municipal palace. Among these surviving doors, the Grand Consistory door had a singular destiny: built in 1552-1553 by Guiraud Mellot, who sculpted the coats of arms of the capitouls of the year 1552, it was transformed in 1628 by the addition of a stucco decoration to commemorate the capture of La Rochelle and to honour Richelieu, whose visit to Toulouse was expected. The capitouls of the year took advantage of the operation to have the original capitular coat of arms covered with their own. This indelicacy had the merit of preserving the coats of arms of the capitouls of 1552 from the revolutionary destruction of 1793, which fell on the 1628 coat of arms. Rediscovered under the layer of stucco during the dismantling of the door in 1880, the 1552 armorial is displayed again on this door of the Capitole which throne since 1932 at the Louvre museum within the collections of sculptures.

The portal of the former Esquile College is the work of Nicolas Bachelier (1556). It celebrates the refoundation of this former medieval college, which in 1550 absorbed eight old colleges. The rustic vermiculated bossing evokes solidity and venerable antiquity. Inspired by compositions from Serlio's Extraordinary Book, it features various emblems hammered at the time of the Revolution.

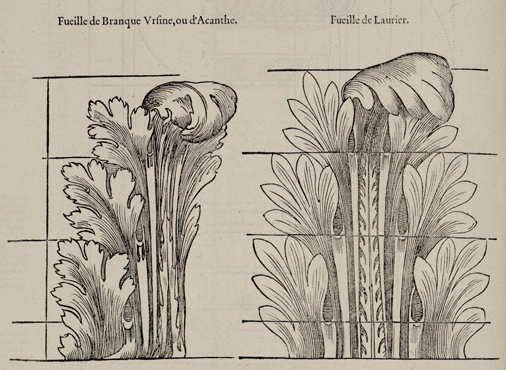
Engraving of acanthus leave (left) and laurel leave (right) to decorate the Corinthian order, Jean Bullant (1568).

The portal of the Hotel Molinier (1556) was inspired by an engraving of Sebastiano Serlio's Extraordinary Book, published in Lyon only five years earlier. This shows how quickly the new prestigious models were adapted to Toulouse during the Renaissance. Built for the parlementary councillor Gaspard de Molinier, it presents a majestic composition between elaborate architecture, sophisticated sculptures and sumptuous polychromies of stone and marble. The paired, fluted and filleted columns are crowned with Corinthian capitals that refer to Roman models such as the Pantheon or the Temple of Mars Ultor, engravings of which were given by Alberti, Labacco or Jean Martin in publications that were published in Italy and France between 1550 and 1553. As an additional enrichment, the capitals are covered with laurel leaves, which are less rigid and dry than acanthus leaves, as was the case on many ancient remains, but also on the contemporary sites of the Louvre and Écouen. The hybrid beings that develop on the attic are inspired by the palace of Fontainebleau. Two half-human, half-plant figures, one female and the other male, are inspired by an engraving of 1536 by Veneziano, reproduced by Androuet du Cerceau between 1546 and 1549. Another important element of the decoration is the setting of dozens of plaques, cabochons, half-spheres or diamond points made of coloured marble from the Pyrenean quarries. These rare and precious marbles are the work of the architect, engineer and carpenter Dominique Bertin, who reopened Roman quarries in the Pyrenees to supply the royal building sites. Despite the distance from the royal court, the responsiveness and sophistication of Toulouse's artistic milieu as displayed on the portal of the Hôtel de Molinier are not surprising, as Bertin, but probably also other Toulousans such as Jean Rancy, who had designed marble columns and decorations for the Capitole (never realized), frequented the great royal architects of the reign of Henri II (Lescot, Primaticcio, De L'Orme...) and thus kept abreast of the latest developments. This ostentatious decoration was topped by the upper part of the portal, which bears the Stoic motto SUSTINE ET ABSTINE, "Bear, and forbear", which the jurisconsult Jean de Coras, an illustrious professor of law at the University of Toulouse, interpreted as guiding a man towards virtue by teaching him patience, the ability to endure hardship, and by inculcating temperance. Two sculpted ewers under the motto, traditionally symbols of these qualities as well as abstinence, reinforce the message of the parlementarian's honesty and integrity. Thus the ambitious decorative programme of this portal, rich in symbols and references, presented several levels of reading, some of which were only accessible to the most erudite. Designed to express the owner's honourability and moral standards, the portal of the Hôtel de Molinier bears witness to the fact that at that time, in architecture as in rhetoric, "any discourse that tended towards greatness required wealth and abundance".

The door of the stair tower of the Hotel d'Assézat (1555–1556) was the main entrance to the hotel. Flanked by large Doric columns which ensure continuity with the classical facades surrounding it, it is embellished with two torso columns said as Salomoniques, in reference to the mythical torso columns of the Temple of Solomon.

The large portal of the Hôtel d'Assézat (1560–1562), a mixture of power and delicate erudition, is the work of Dominique Bachelier, son of the famous Nicolas Bachelier, author of the classical facades of the courtyard of this same hotel a few years earlier. The Doric pilasters that frame the door offer an alternating succession of diamond points, giving the whole a precious dimension.

Dating from 1604 or 1605, the large portal of the Jesuit college was admired by Rodin, who drew it several times. The decoration carved in stone bore the coats of arms of the eight capitouls of the year as well as the double coats of arms of France-Navarre on the left and Toulouse-Languedoc on the right, although only four of the capitouls' coats of arms are still clearly visible.

The portal of the Hôtel de Clary, or “stone hotel” (1610–1616), is only double in appearance: the door on the right is a false door created solely for reasons of symmetry. Above the doors, Mercury and Apollo on the left, Juno and Minerva on the right, celebrate the owners in a richly carved mannerist decoration.

Built from 1617 onwards, the Hôtel de Chalvet is representative of a change of style which was to leave its mark on the architecture of 17th century Toulouse: the sculpted decoration is abandoned in favour of austerity only brightened up on the openings by alternating brick and stone. Only its portal with bosses is still inspired by Renaissance references, and it was one of the last to do so with the spectacular portal of the Hôtel Desplats (around 1620–1622).

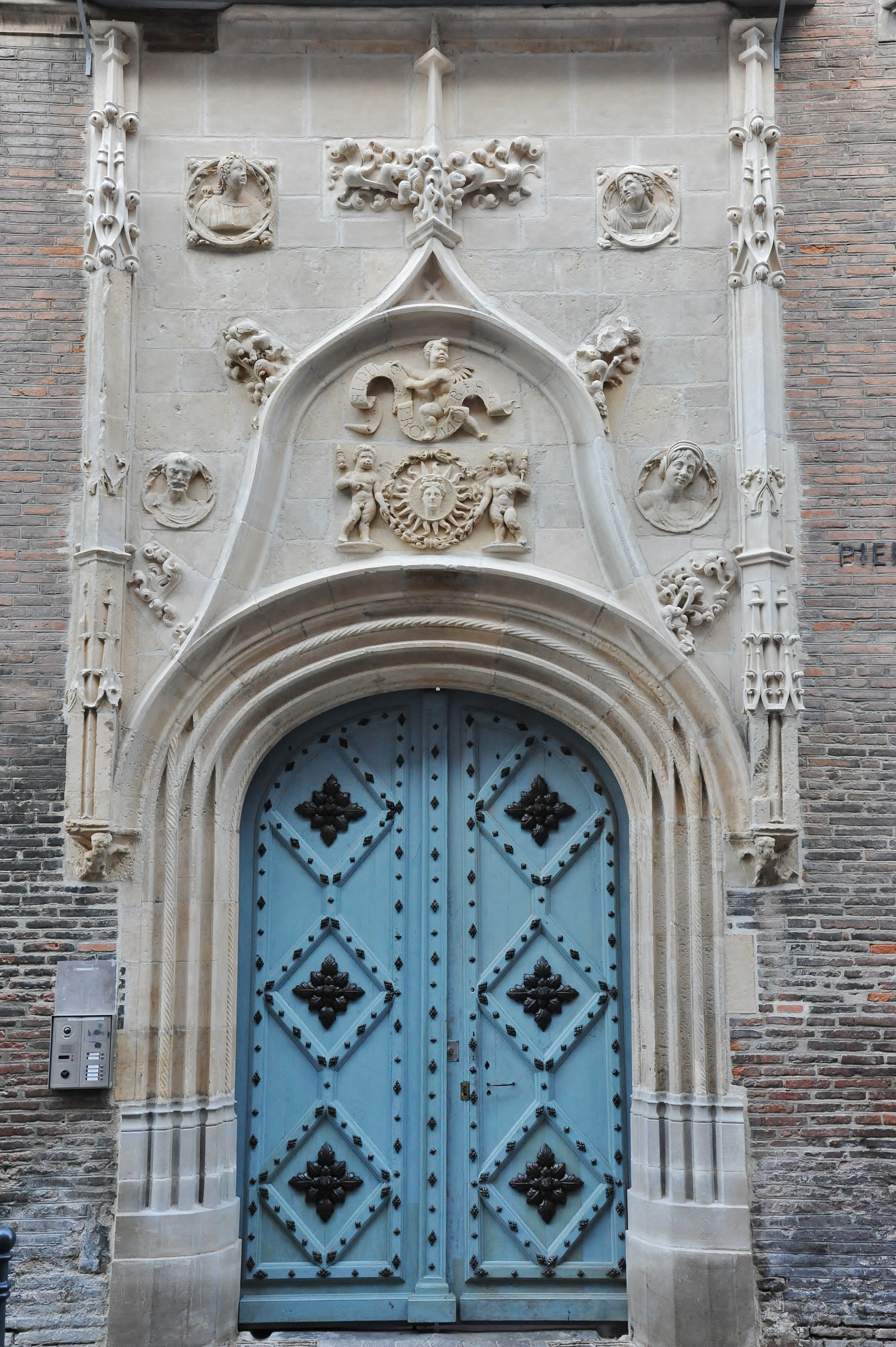
The portal of the Hôtel de Bernuy is mainly Flamboyant Gothic (1504) but also partially Renaissance (1530-1536).

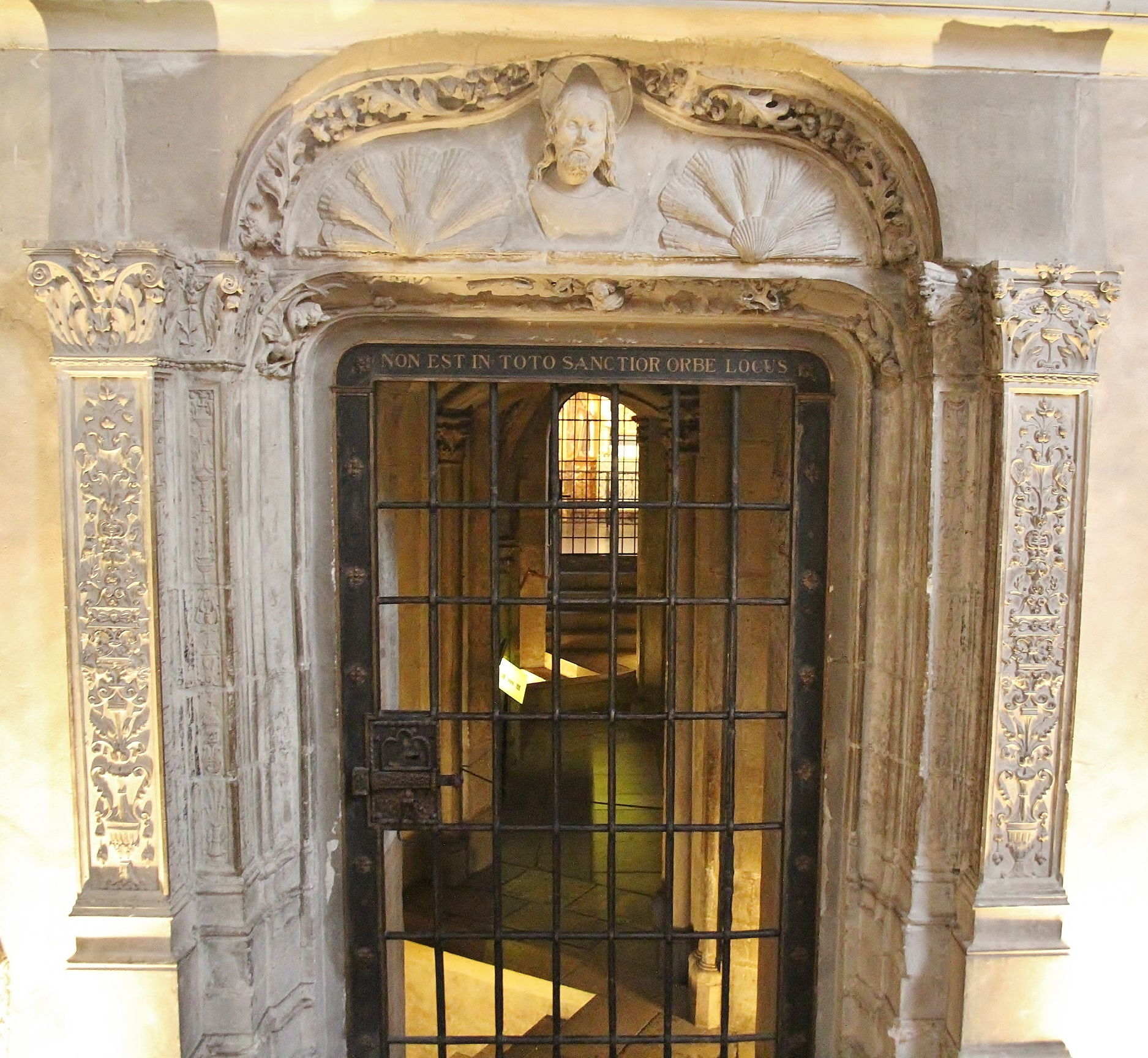
The south door of the crypt of the Saint-Sernin basilica was the first manifestation of Renaissance architecture in Toulouse in 1518.

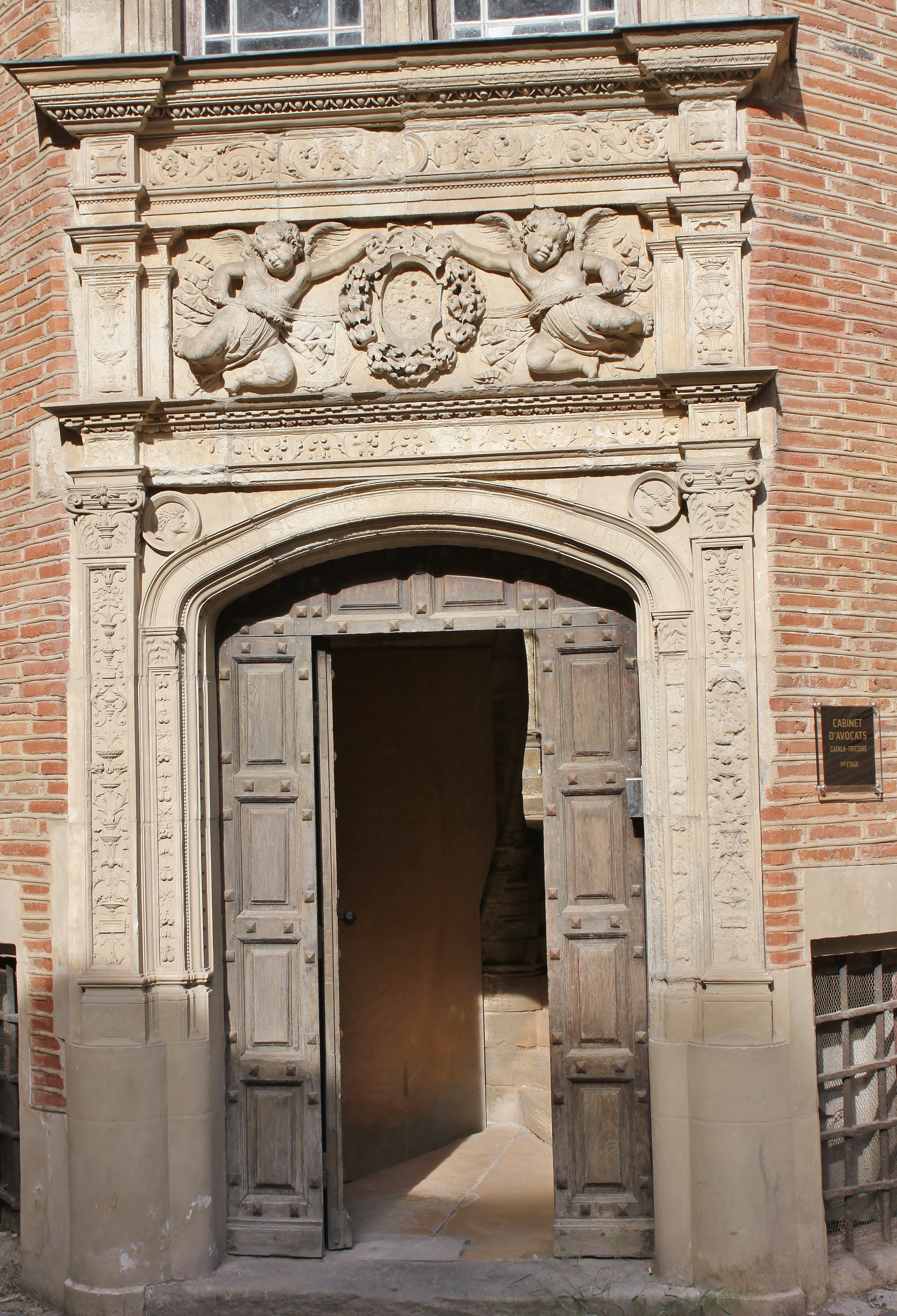
Door of the stair tower of the Hôtel du Vieux-Raisin (between 1515 and 1528).

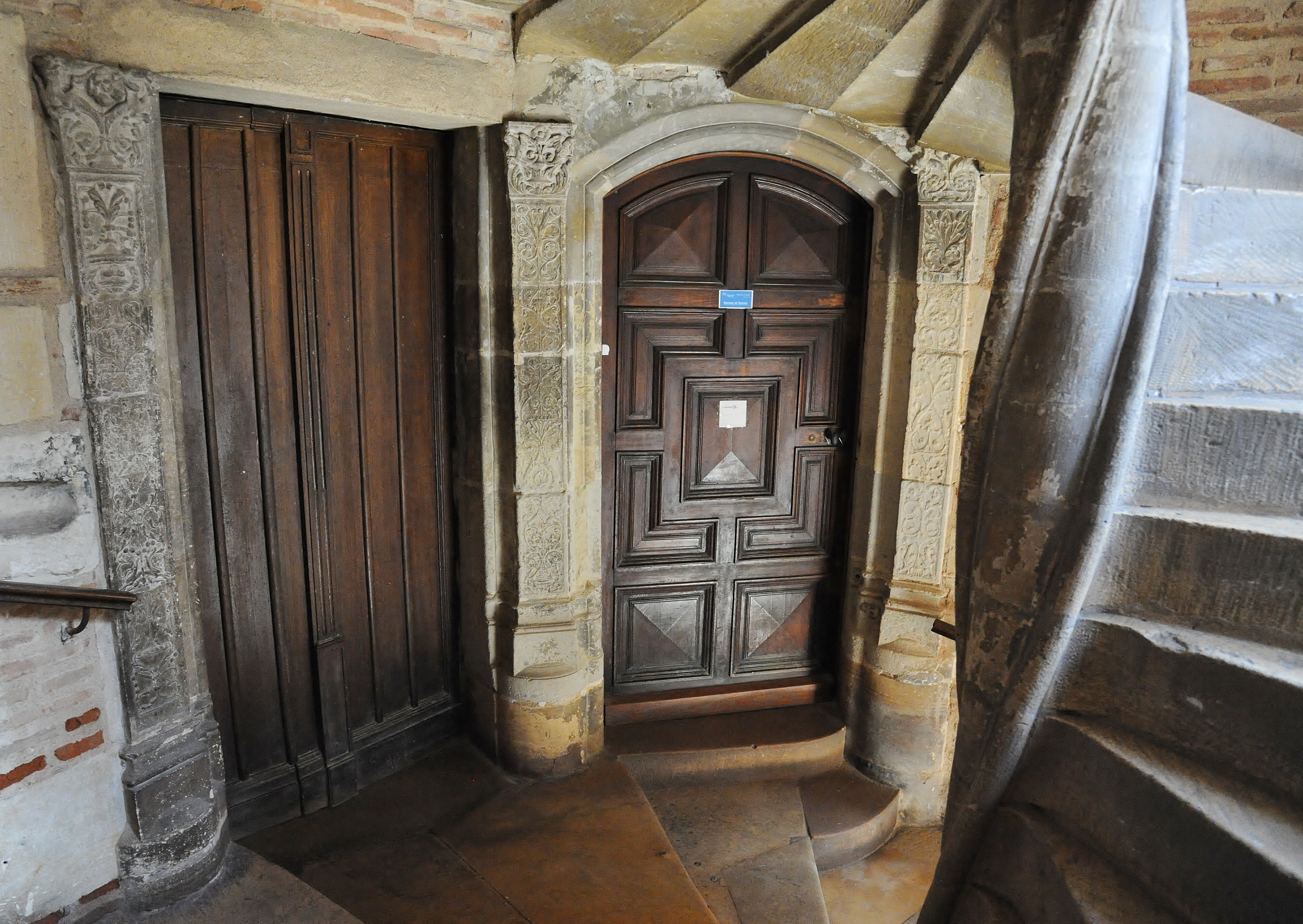
Doors on the ground floor of the stair tower of the Hôtel du Vieux-Raisin (between 1515 and 1528).

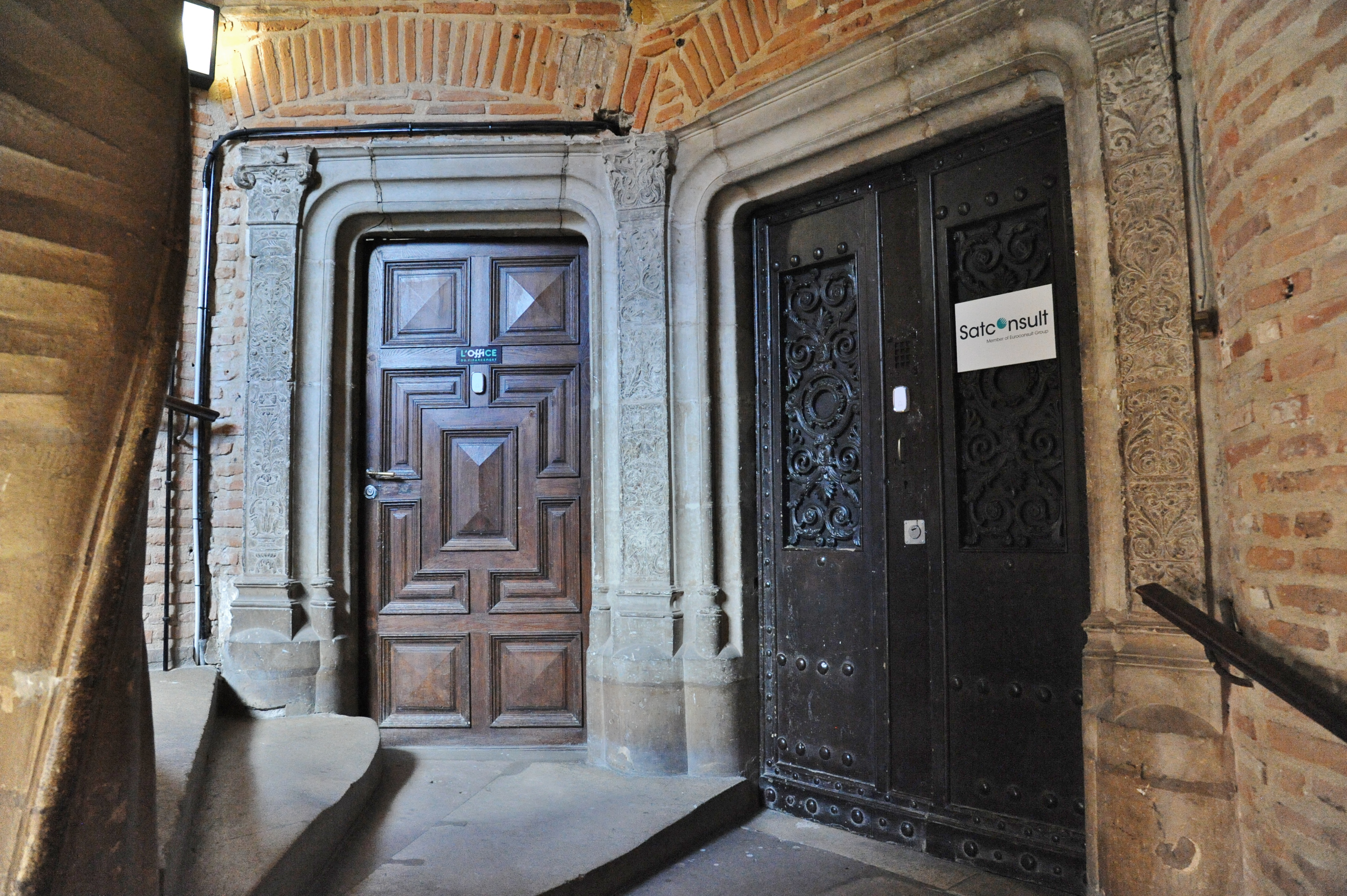
Doors on the first floor of the stair tower of the Hôtel du Vieux-Raisin (between 1515 and 1528).

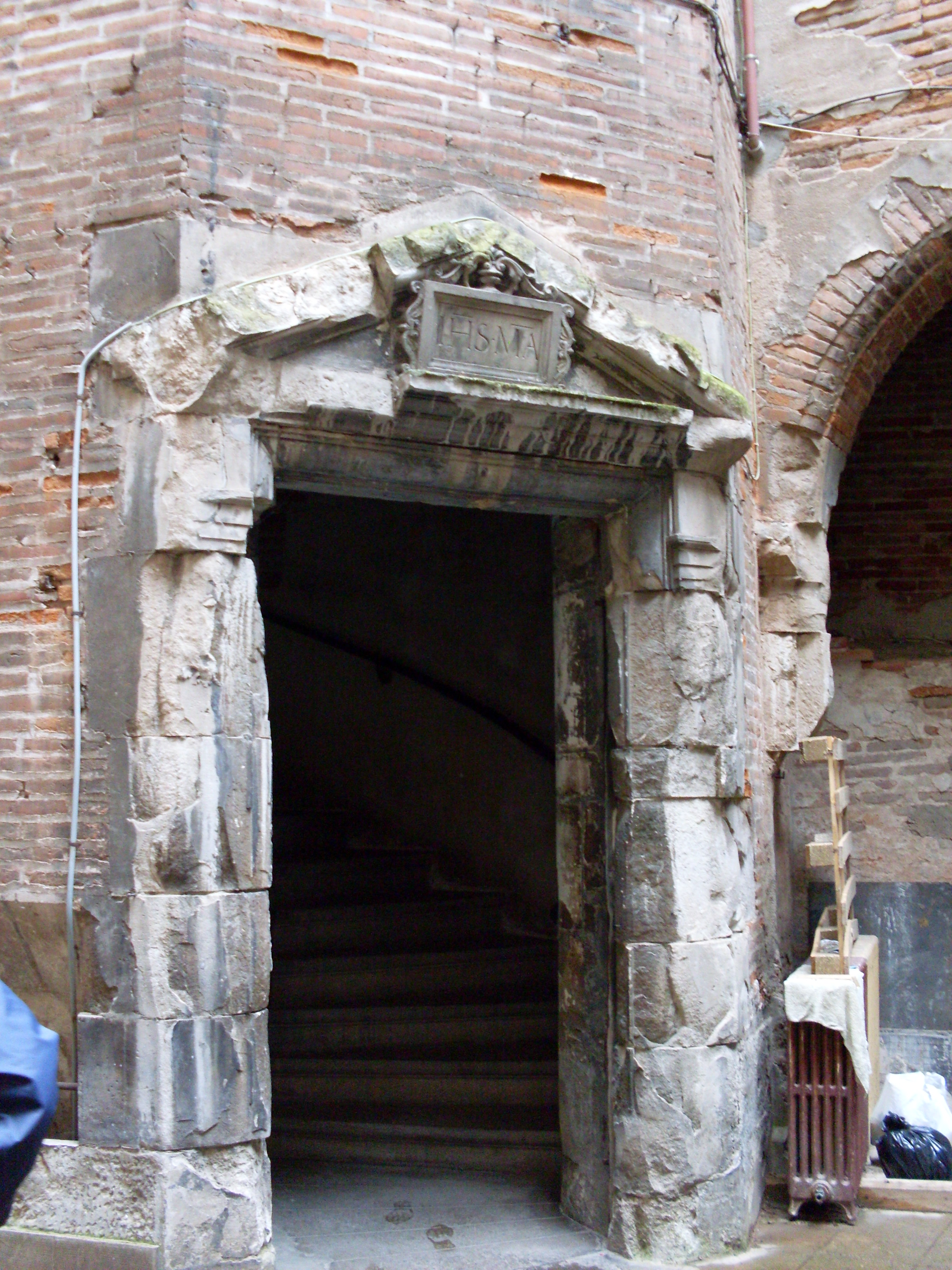
Tower door of the Hôtel Delpech.

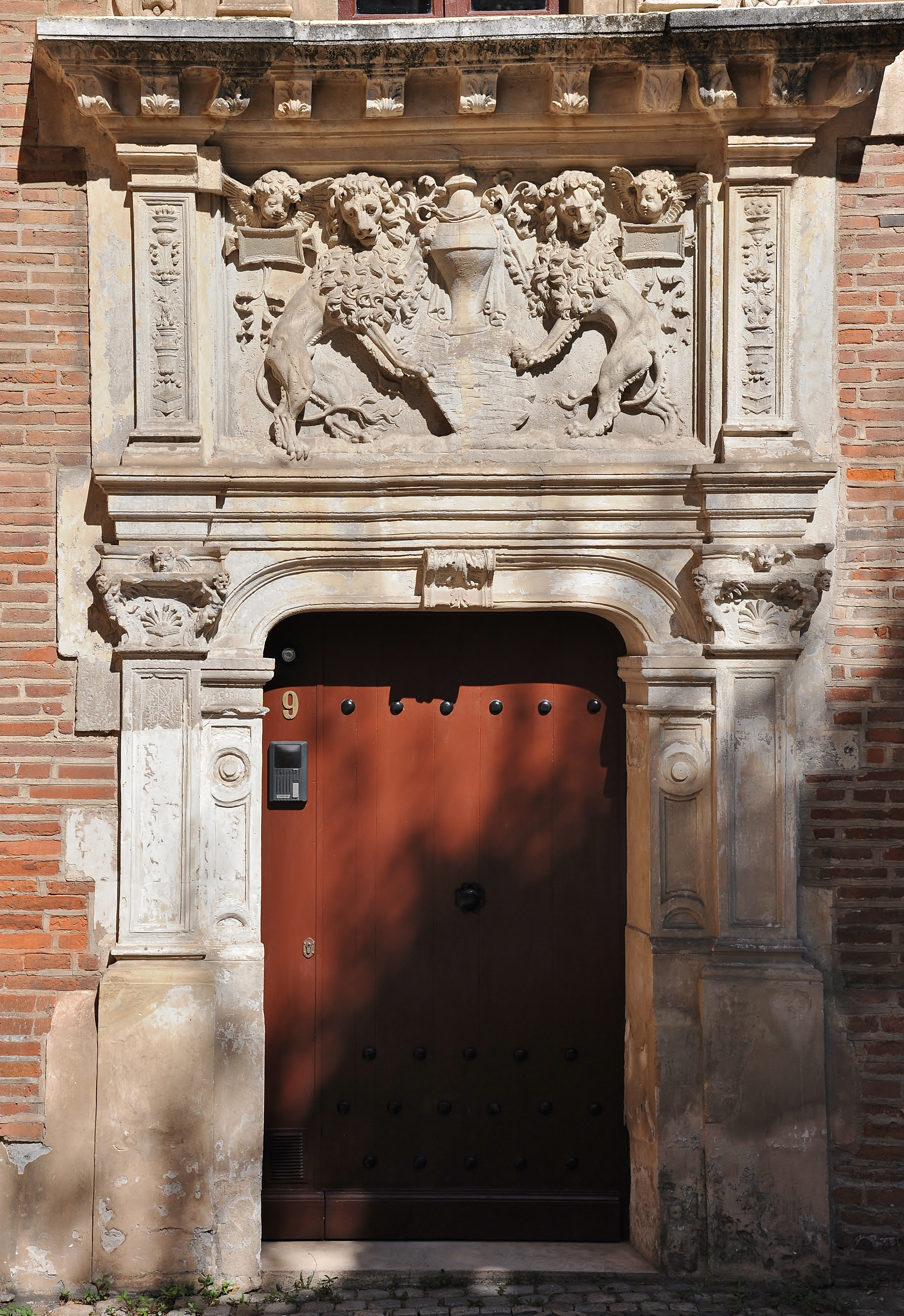
Tournoer tower gate (1532).

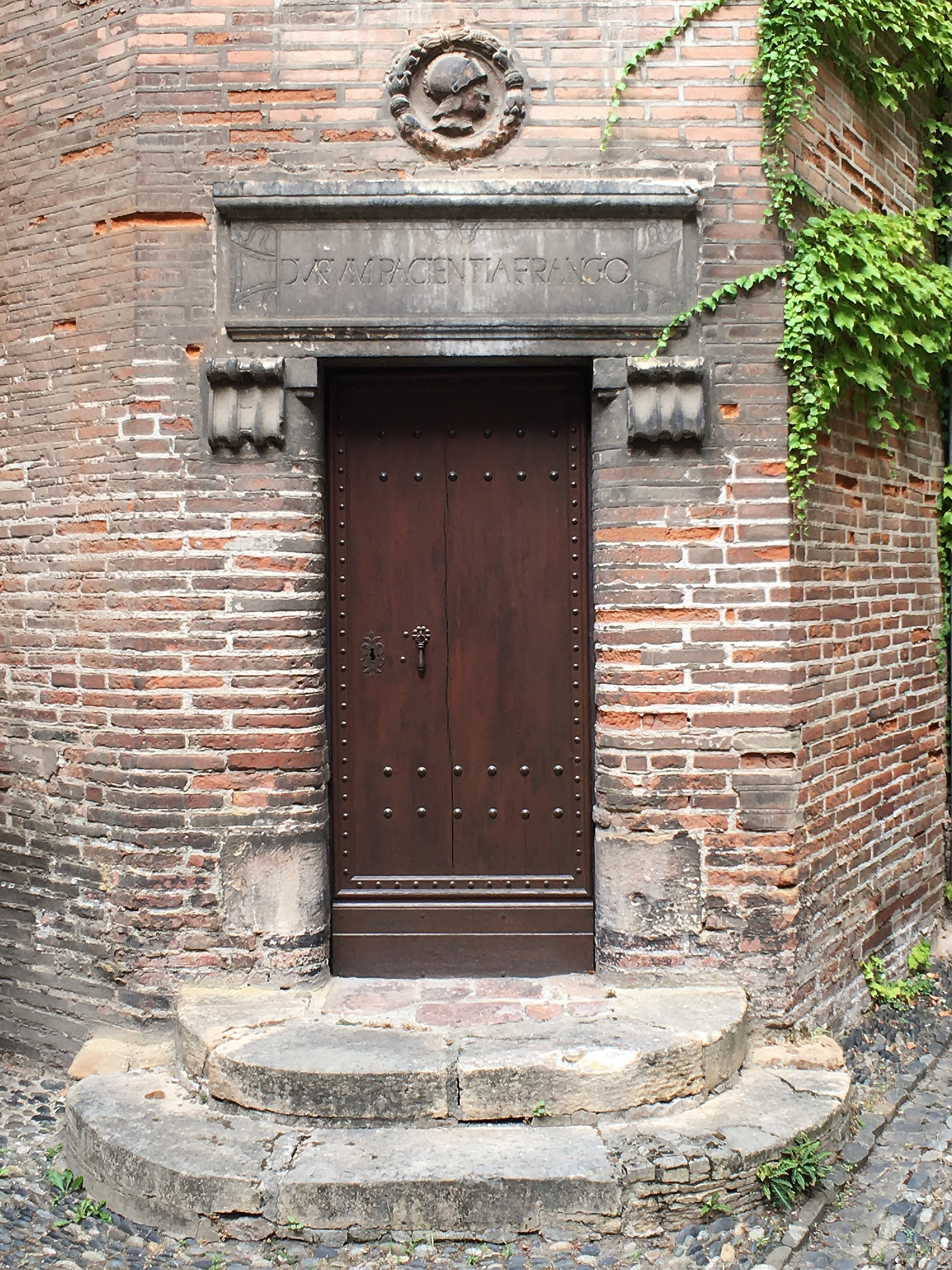
Door of the tower of the Hotel d'Ulmo (between 1526 and 1536).

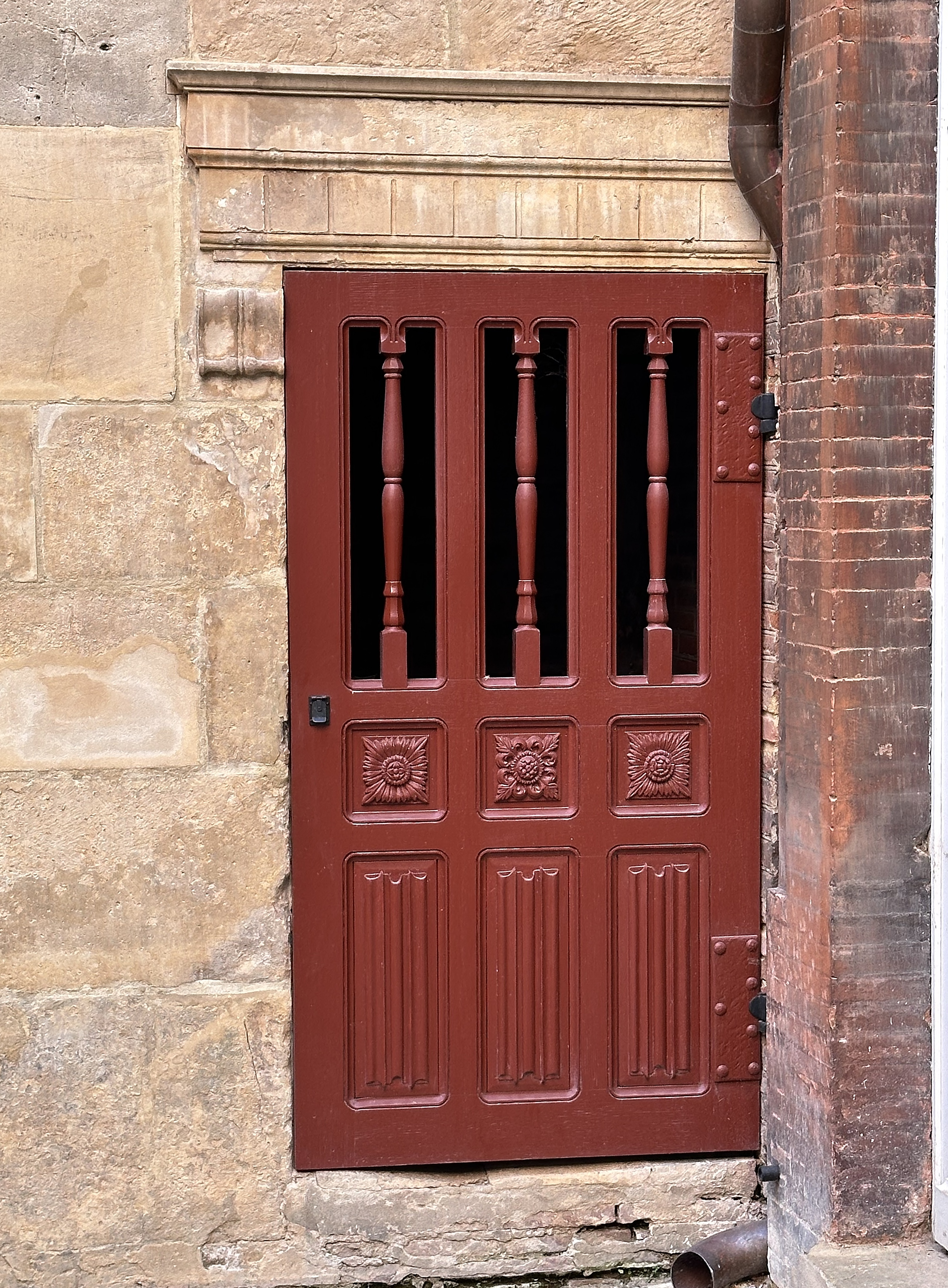
Little door, hôtel de Bernuy (between 1530 and 1536).

Doorway to the passage connecting the two courtyards of the Hôtel de Bernuy (1530–1536).

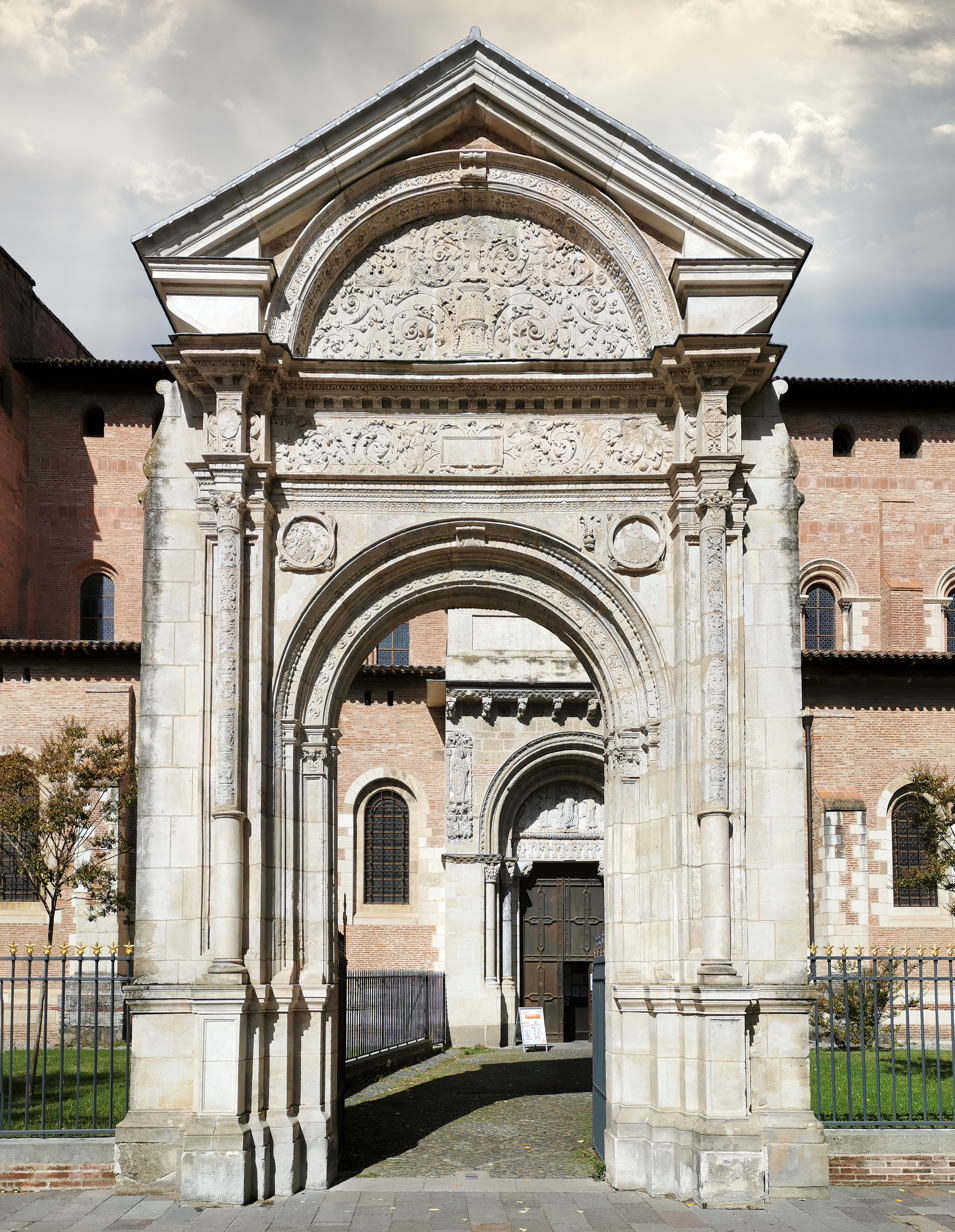
Remains of an enclosure that surrounded Saint-Sernin: a portal from the 1530s.

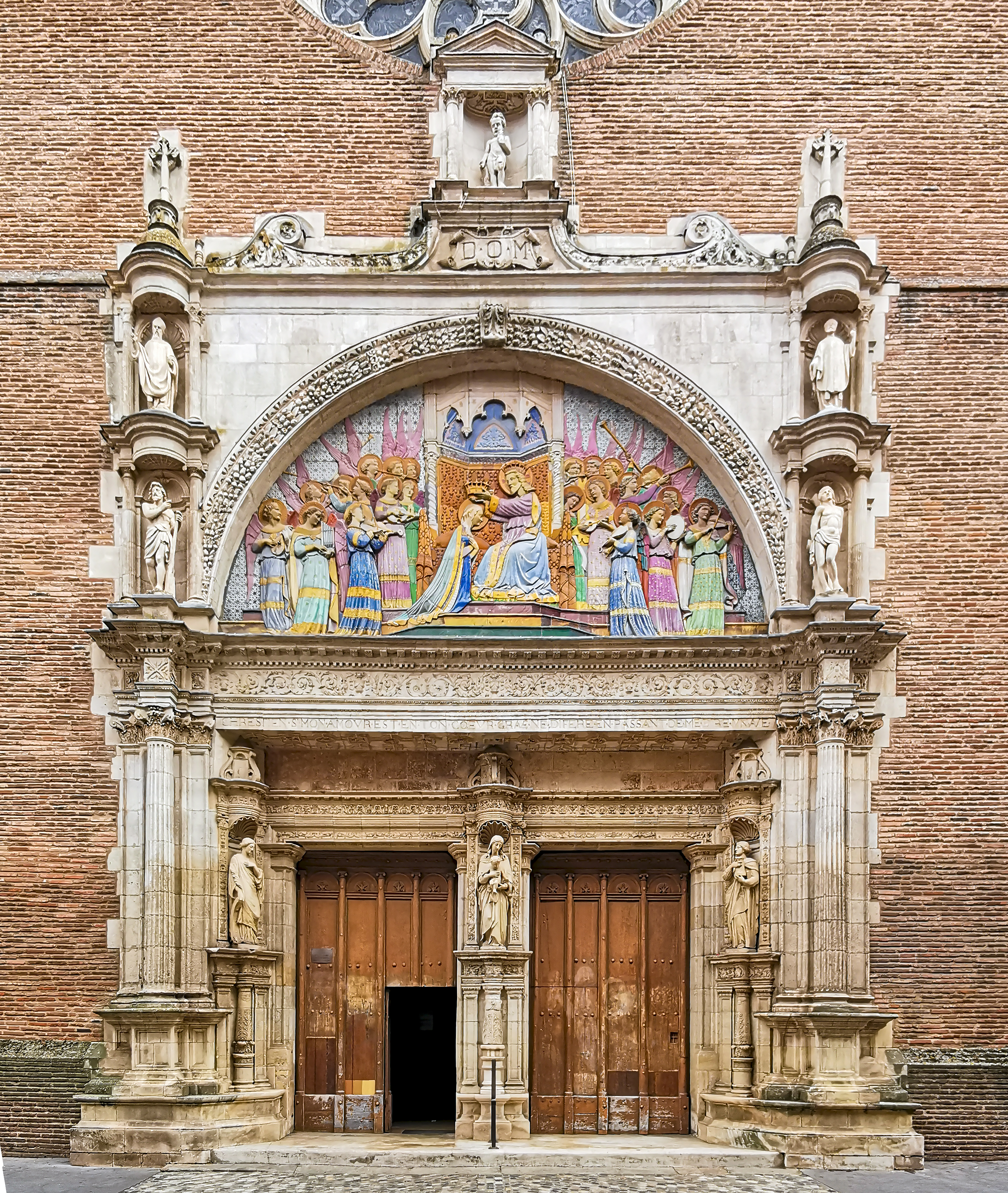
Portal of the Dalbade Church (1537-1540, except for the 19th century tympanum, reproduction of the Coronation of the Virgin by Fra Angelico).

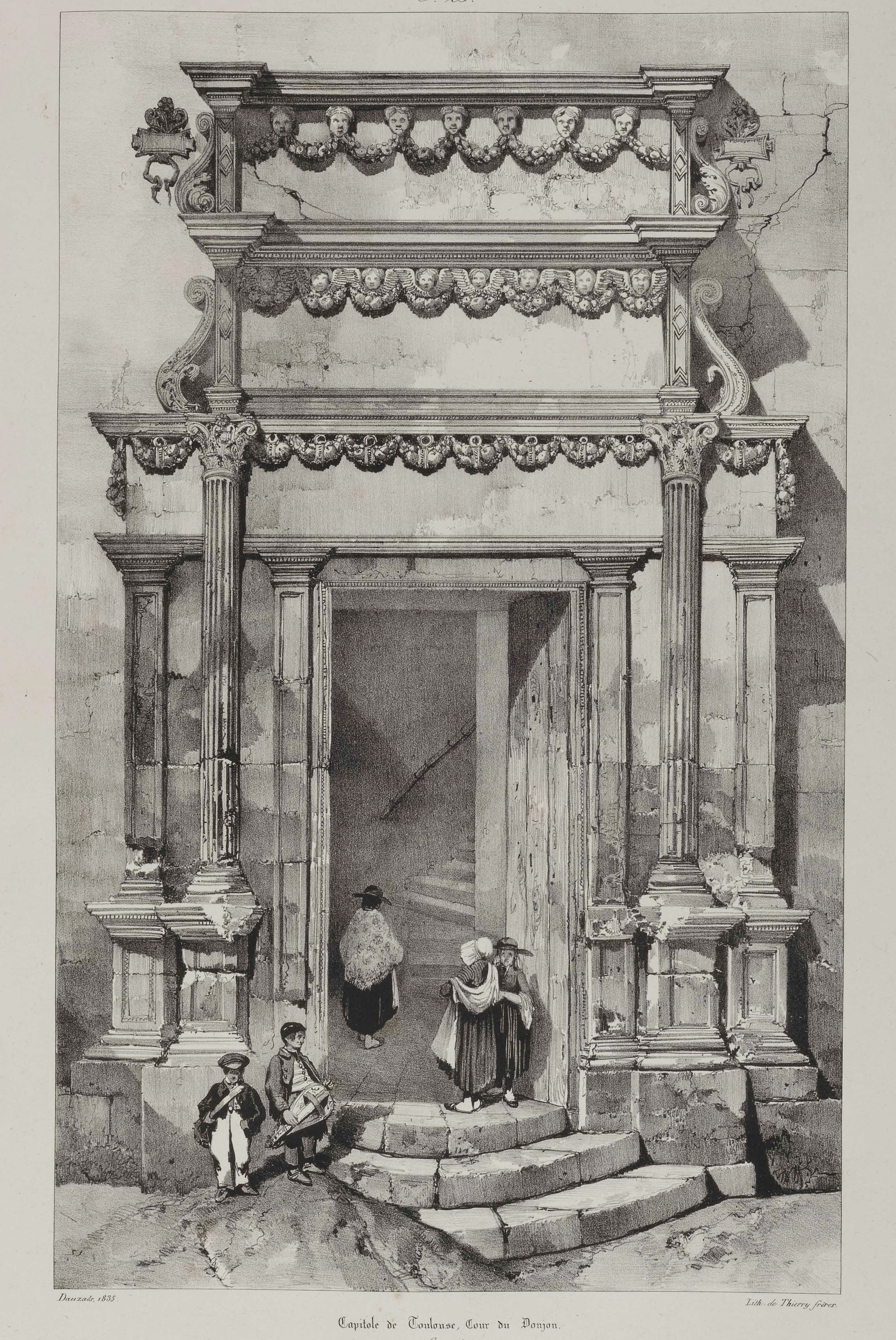
Door of the Tour de la Vis of the former Capitole (1537, Sébastien Bouguereau), destroyed in the 19th century.

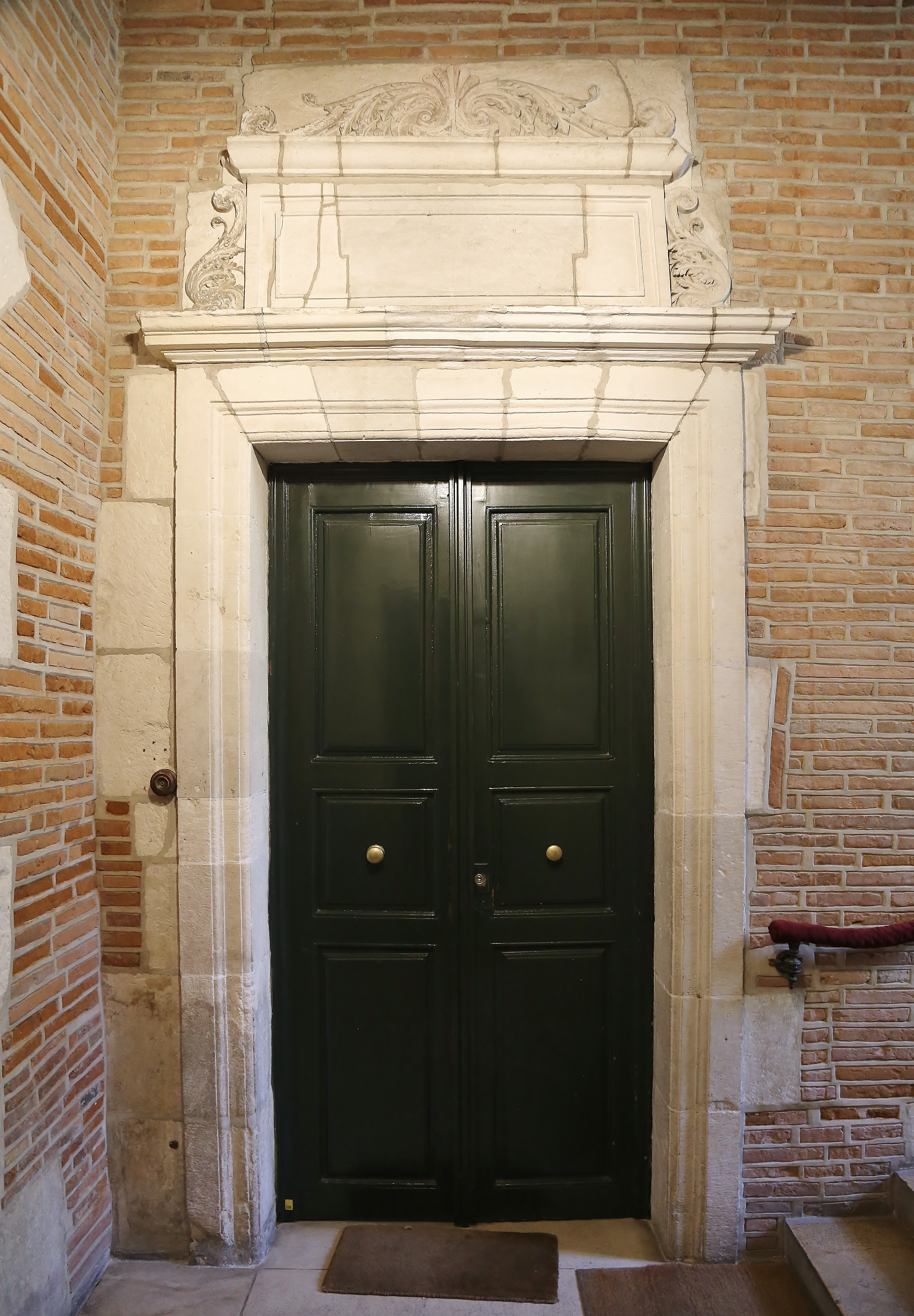
Hôtel de Bagis, interior door (1538, Nicolas Bachelier).

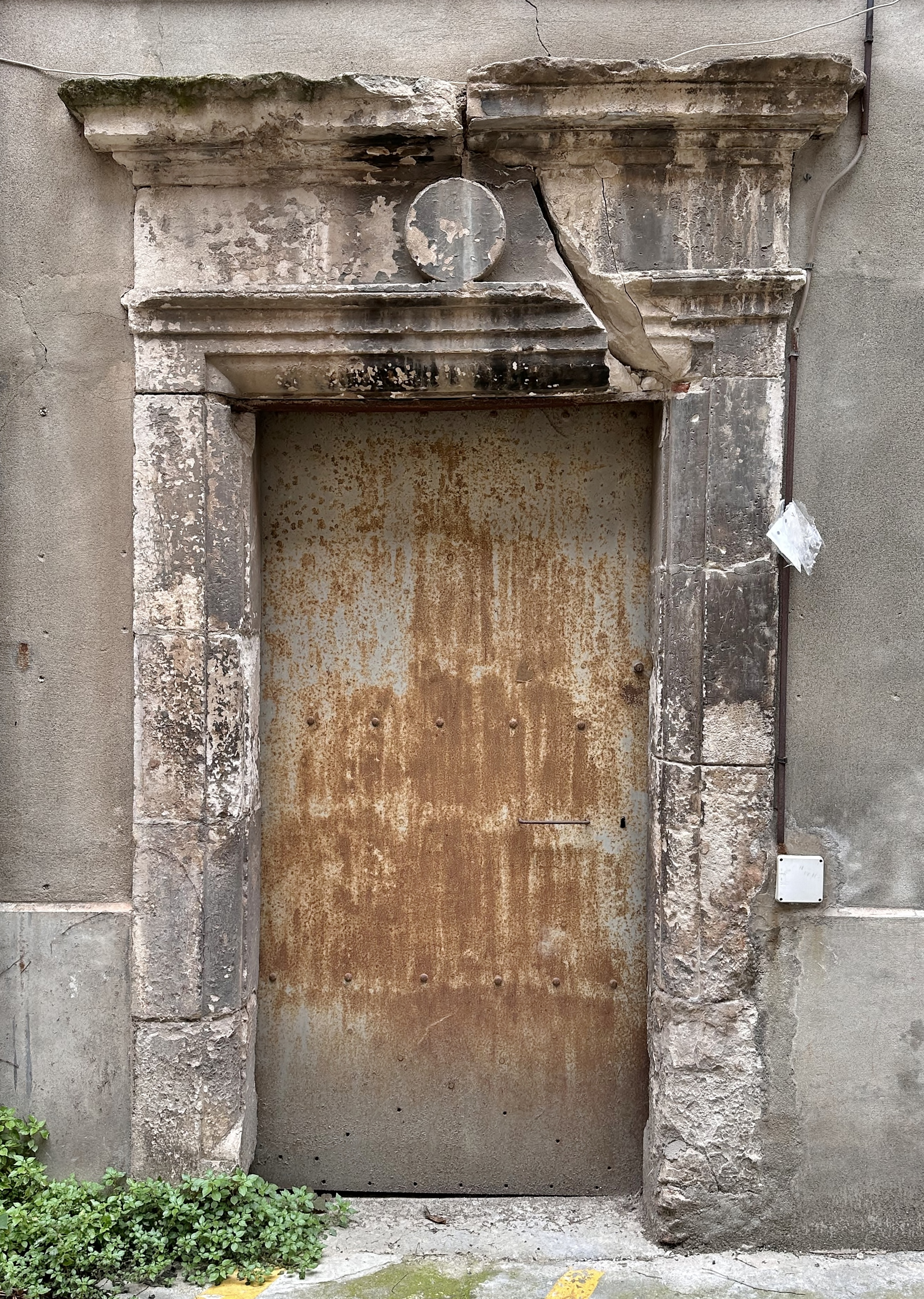
Door in the courtyard of 14 rue des Gestes.

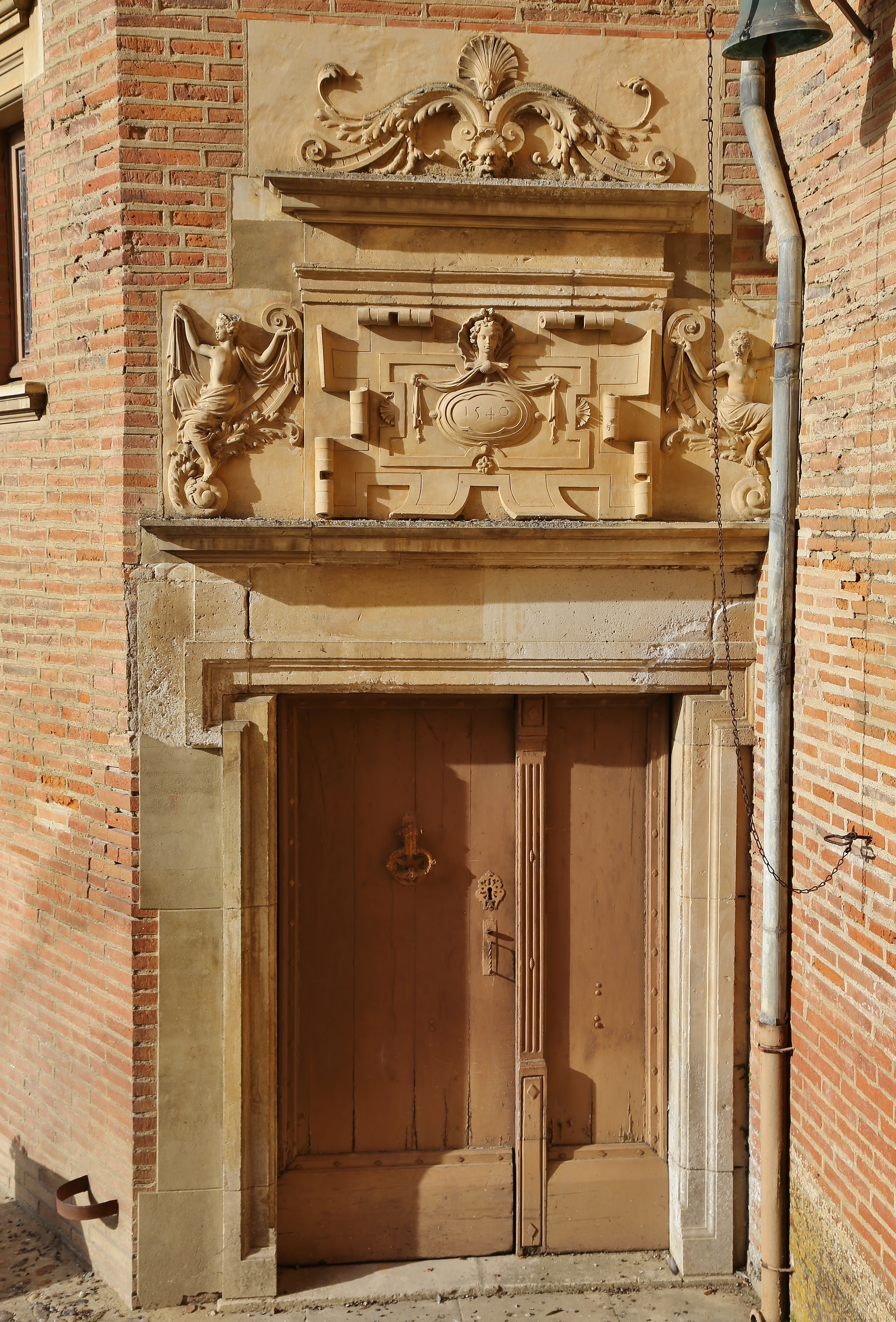
Door of the tower of the castle of Pibrac (decoration of 1540 attributed to Nicolas Bachelier, restored in 1902-1904).

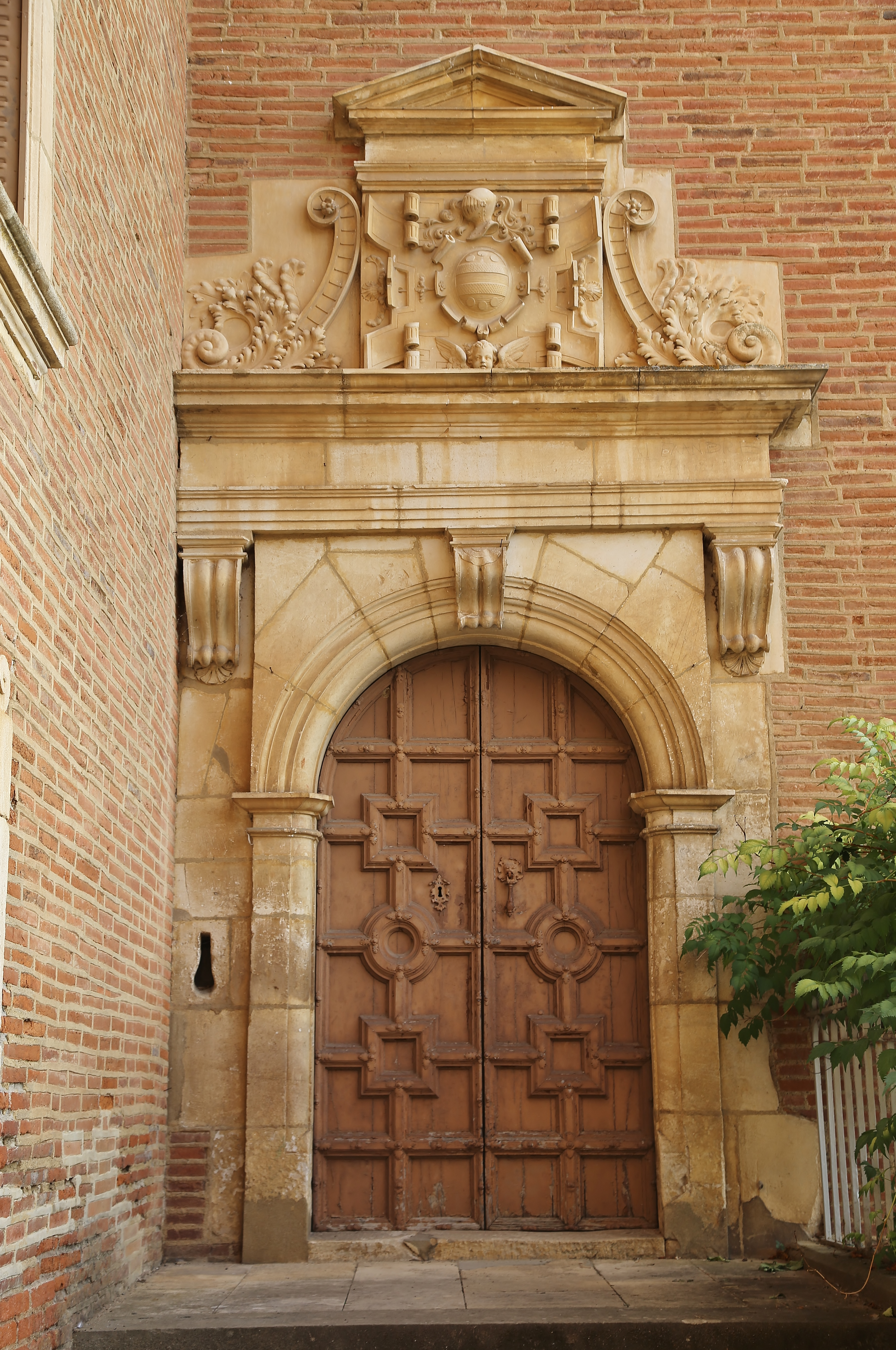
Door of the castle of Pibrac (decoration restored in 1902-1904).

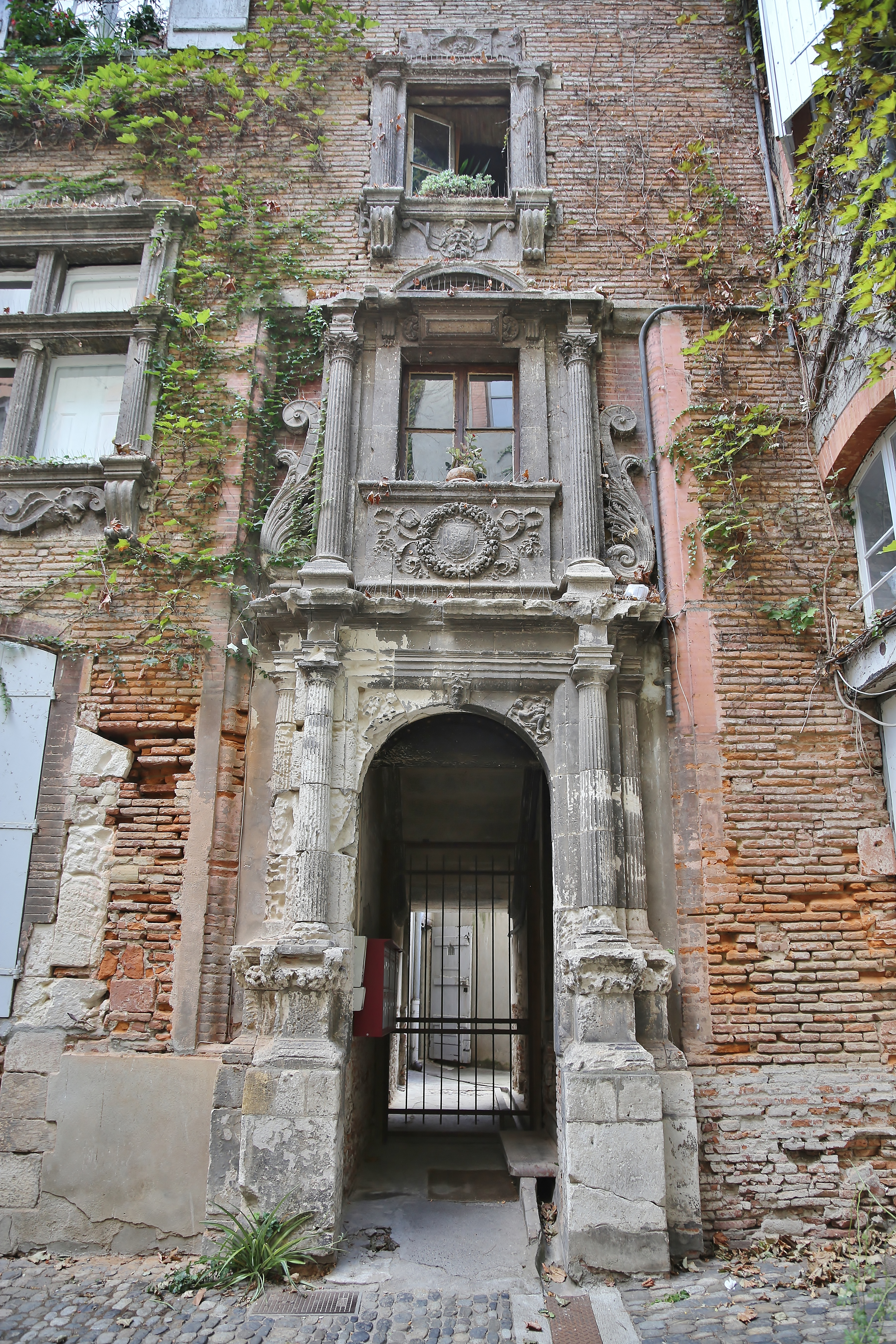
Portal in the courtyard of the Hôtel de Guillaume de Bernuy (1540-1544, Nicolas Bachelier).

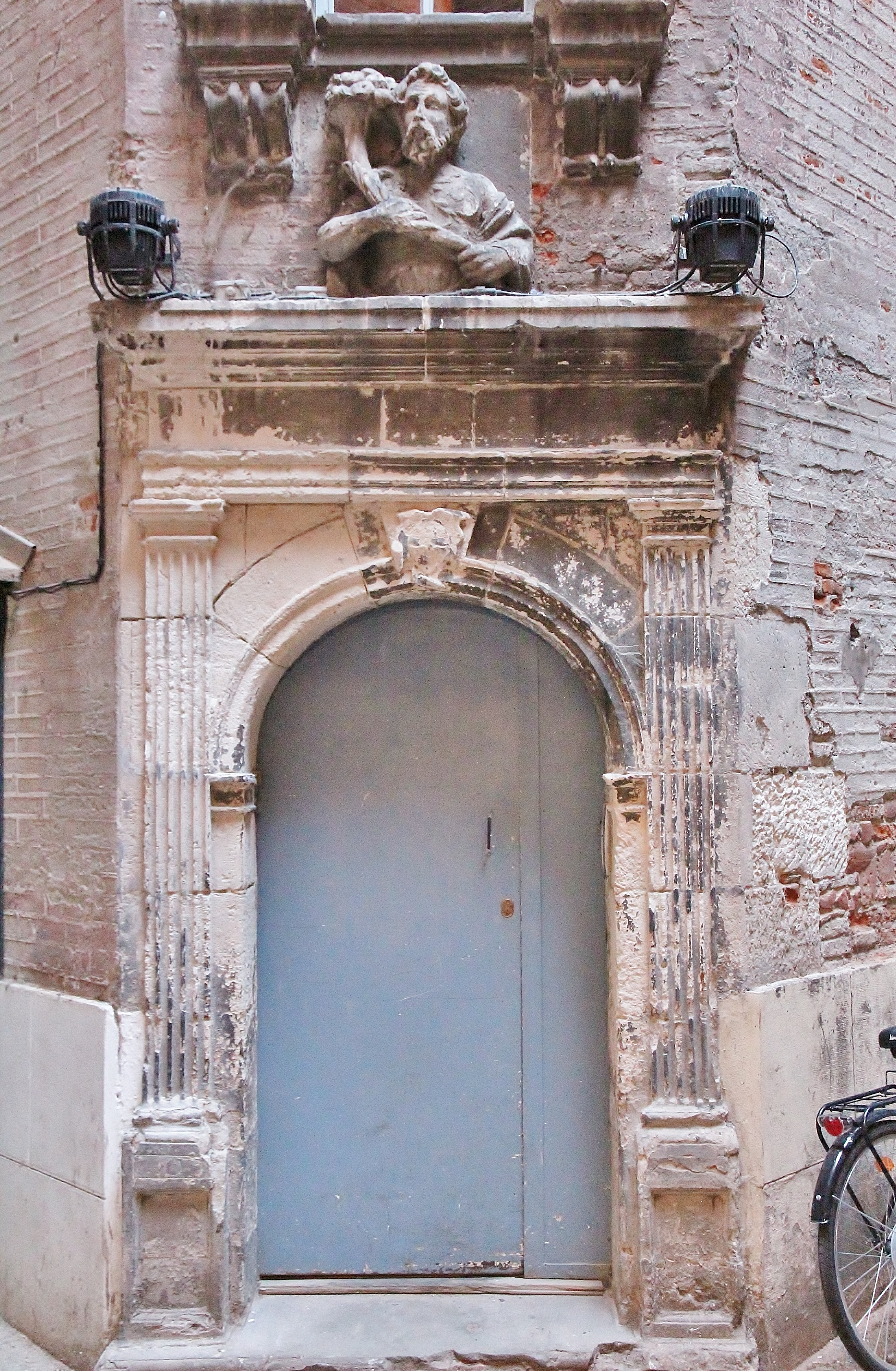
Door of the stair tower of the Hôtel de Brucelles (1544).

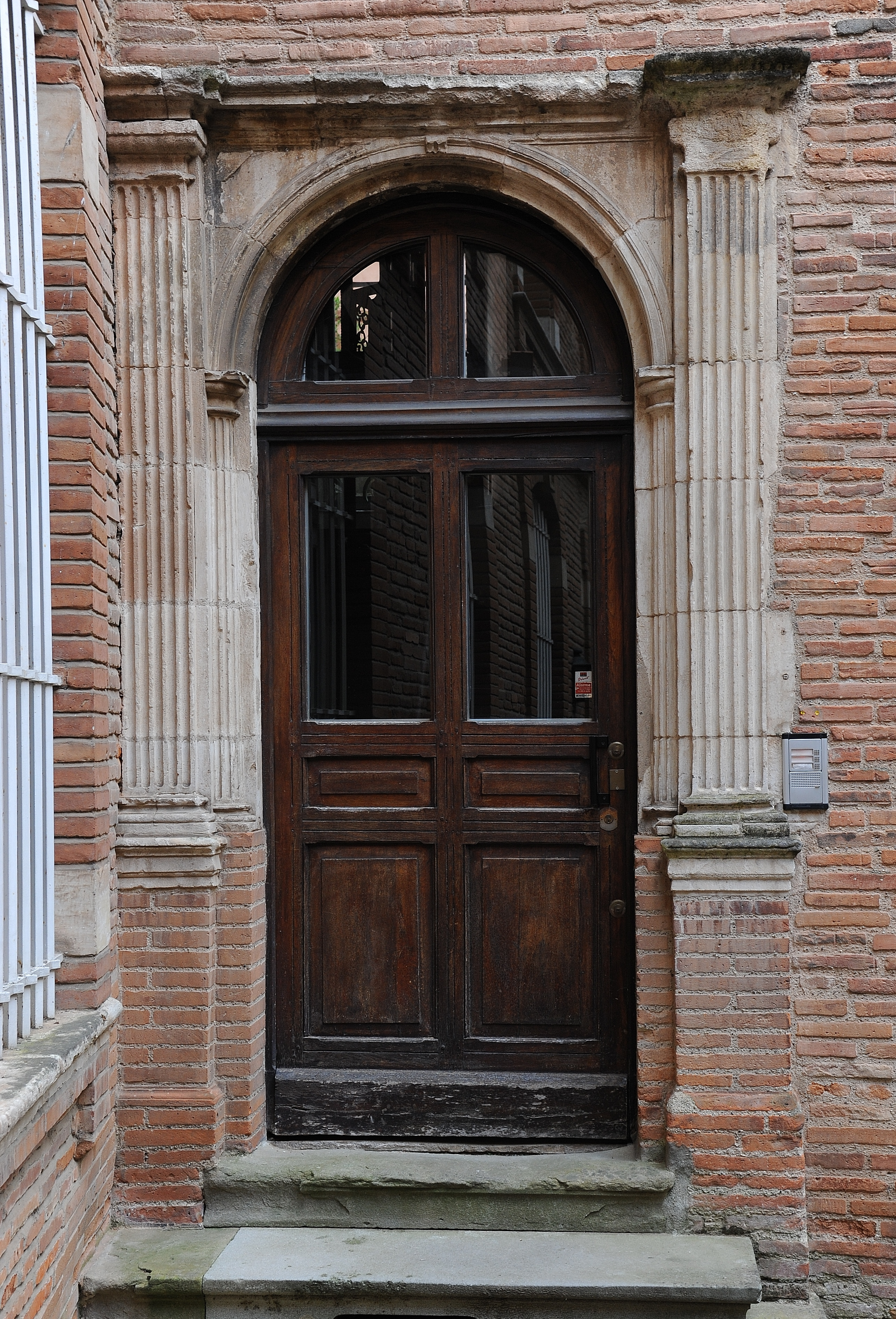
Gate in the courtyard of Hôtel de Catel.

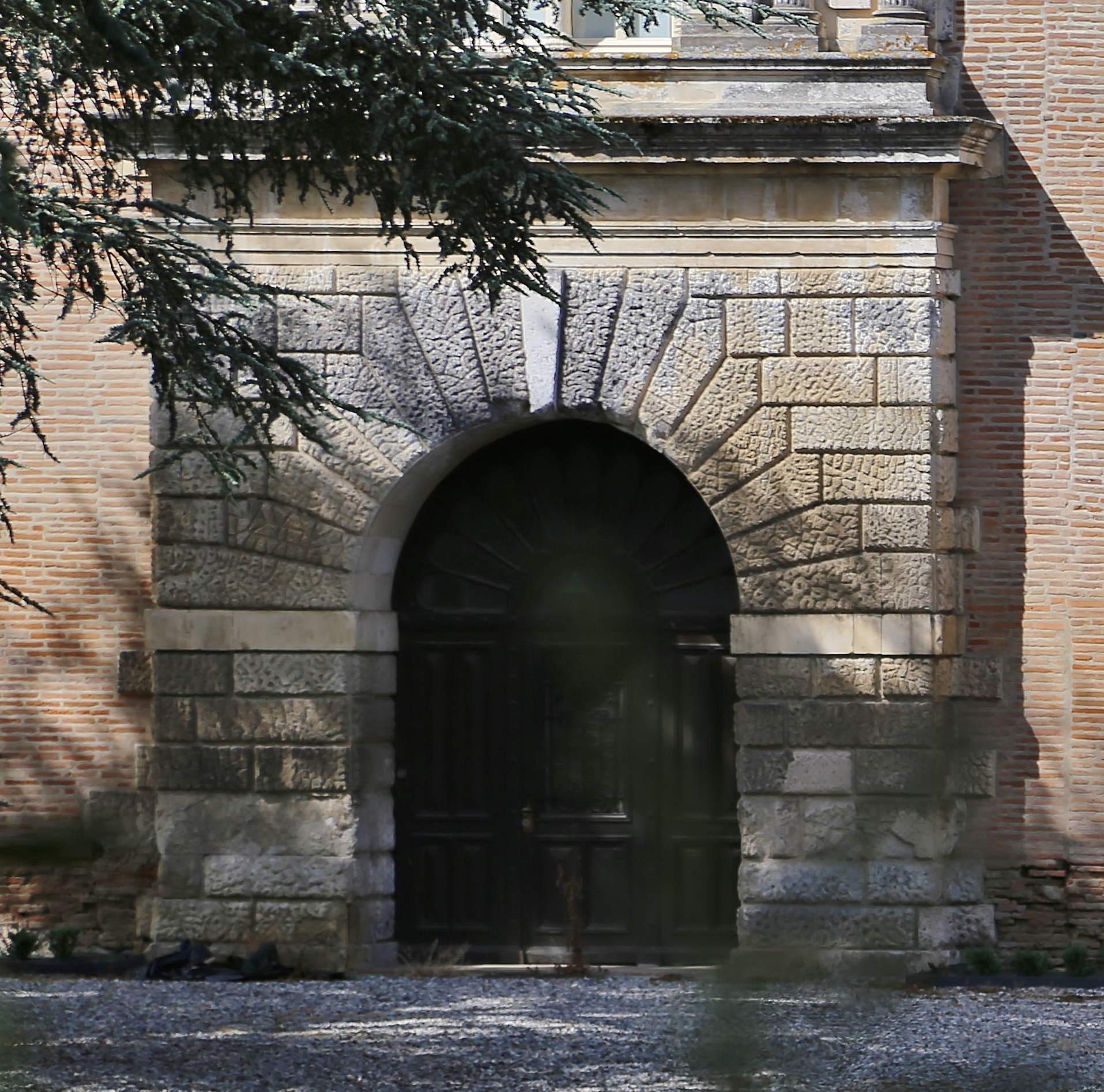
Door of the eastern facade of the Saint-Jory castle (1545, Nicolas Bachelier).

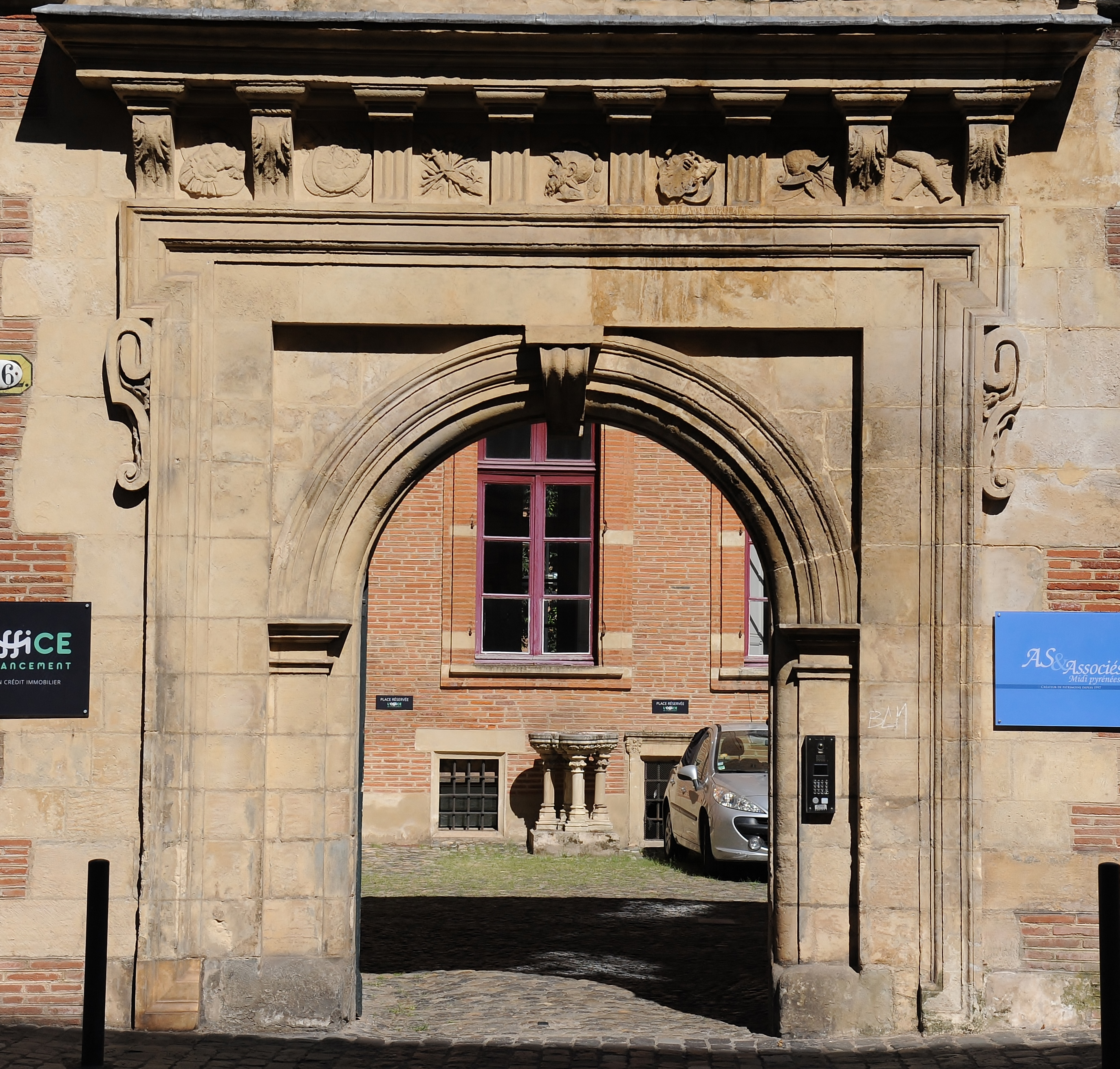
Entrance portal of the Hôtel du Vieux-Raisin (from 1547), with a beautiful frieze of metopes.

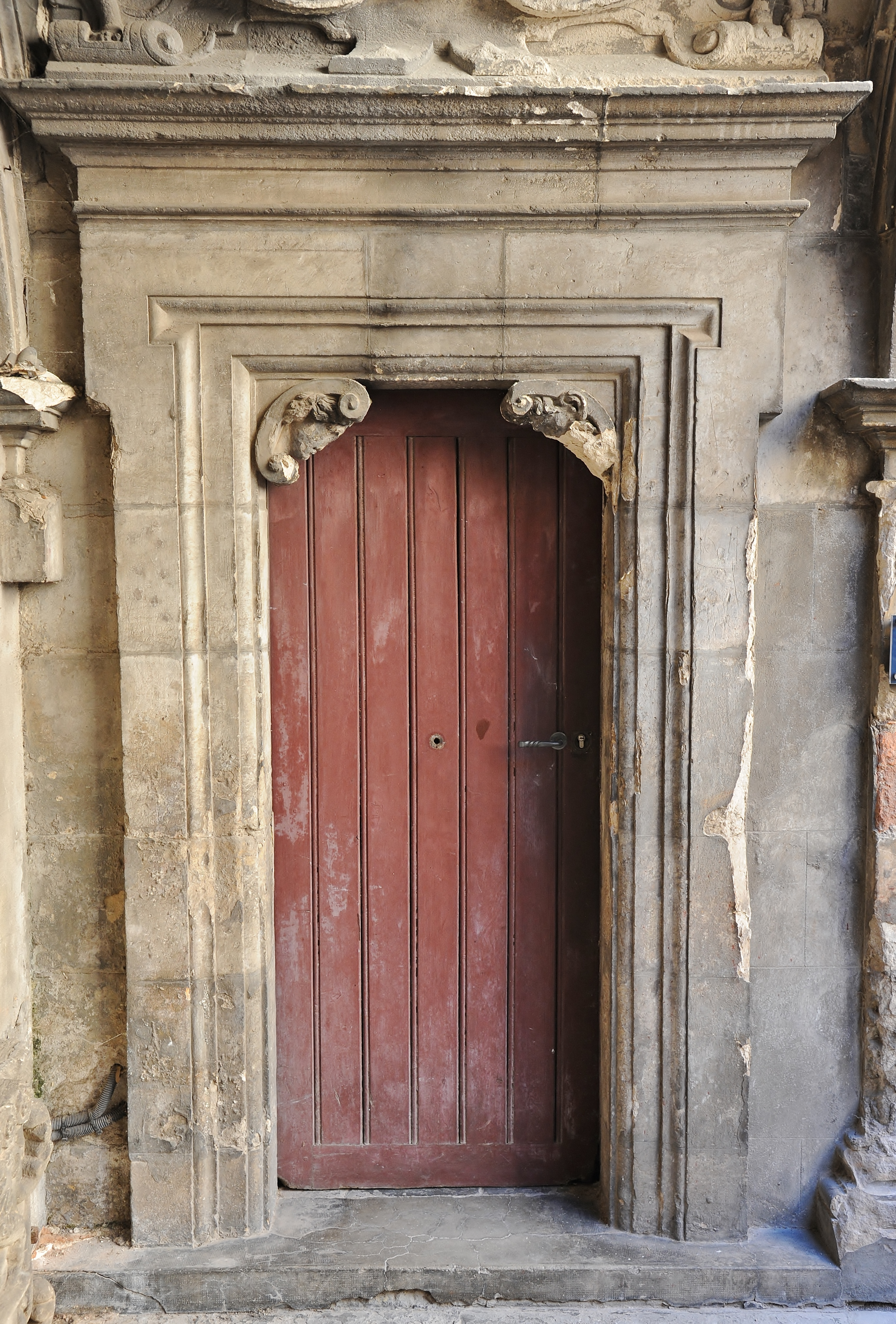
Door under the portico of the Hôtel du Vieux-Raisin.

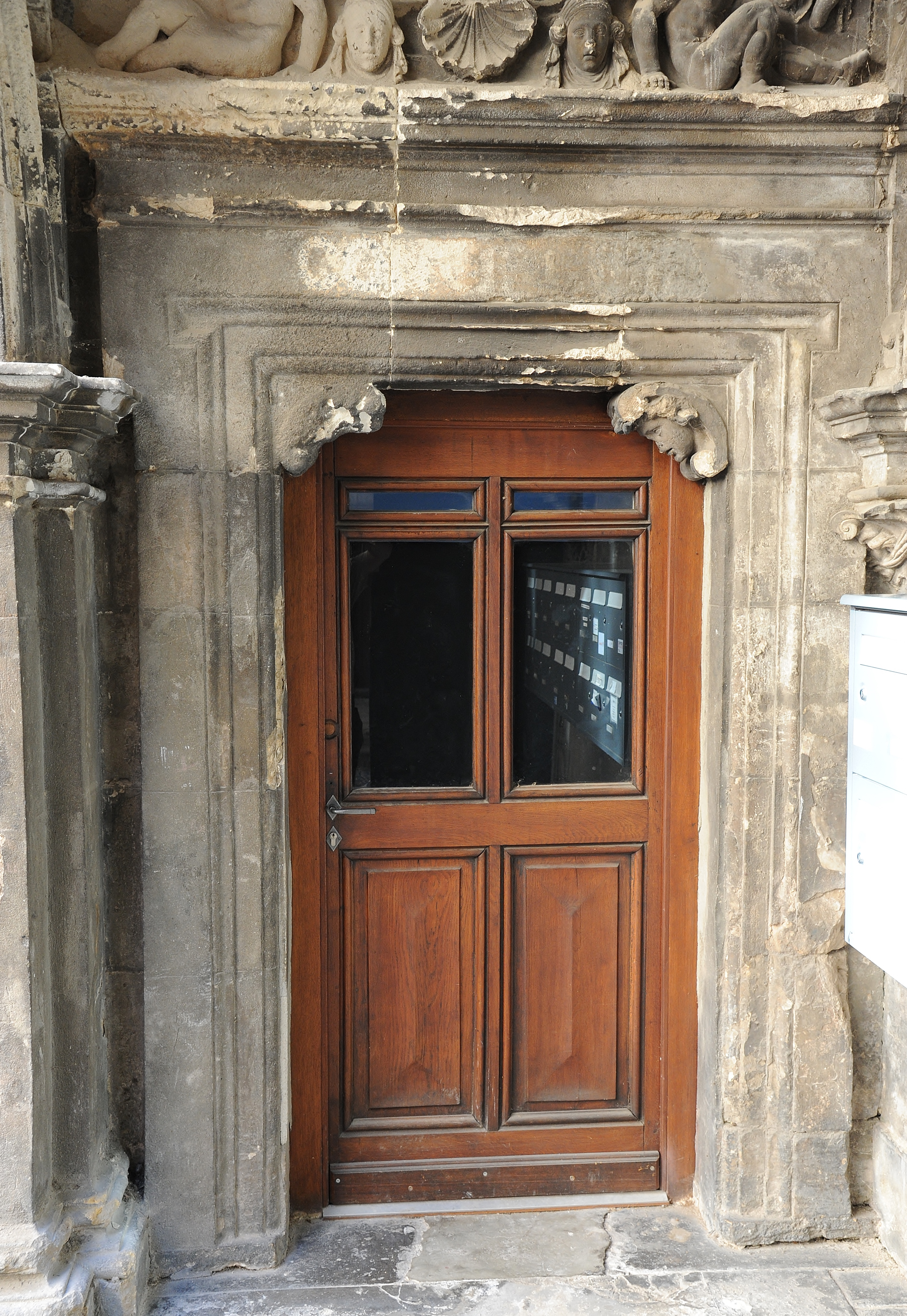
Door under the portico of the Hôtel du Vieux-Raisin.

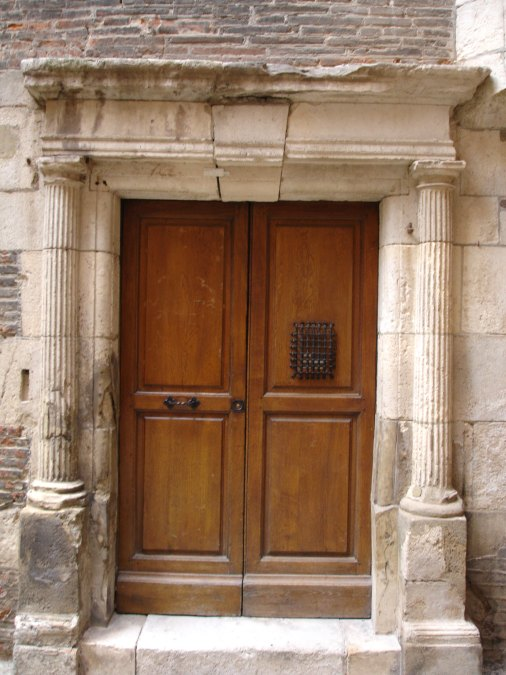
Door of the tower of the Hôtel de Mansencal.

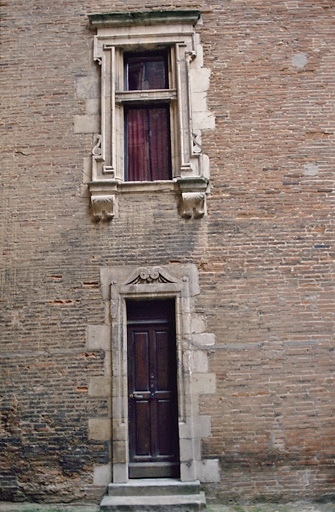
Door in the courtyard of the Hôtel de Mansencal.

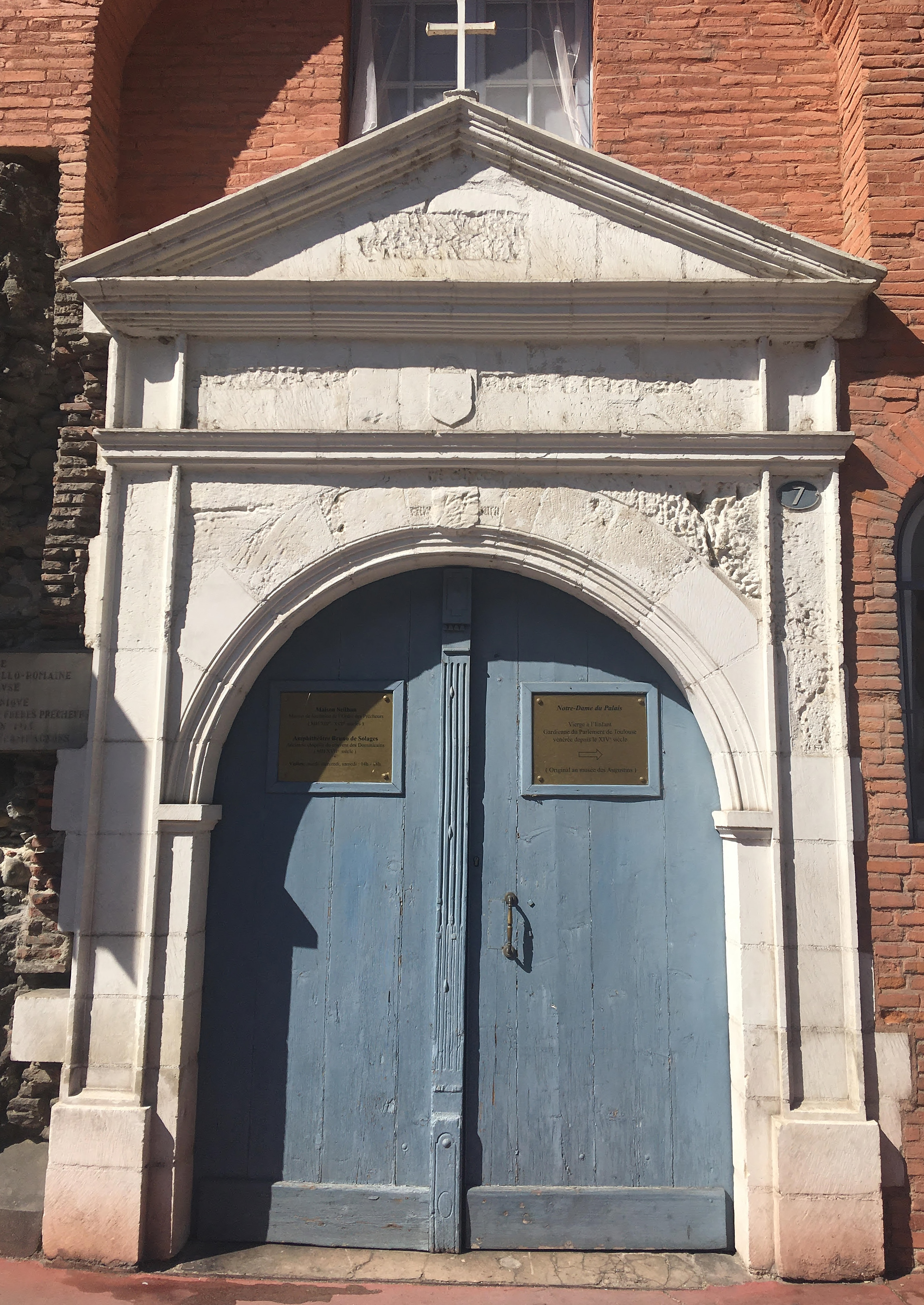
Door of the Maison Seilhan (1551, Laurent Clary).

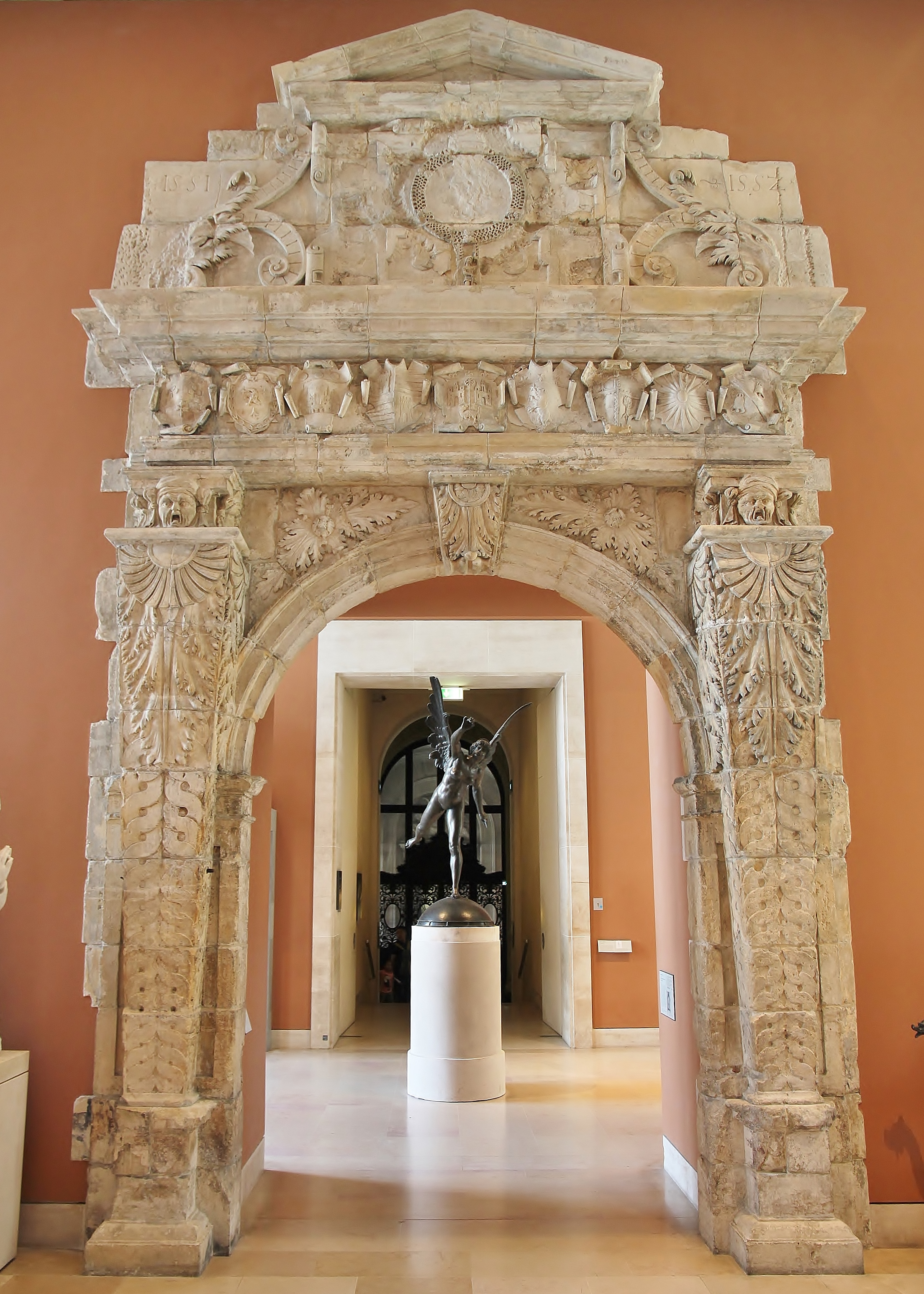
This door of the former Capitole was built in 1553 by Guiraud Mellot at the request of the capitouls, it was the entrance to the Hall of the Grand Consistory of the Capitole. Today it can be seen in the Louvre Museum in Paris.

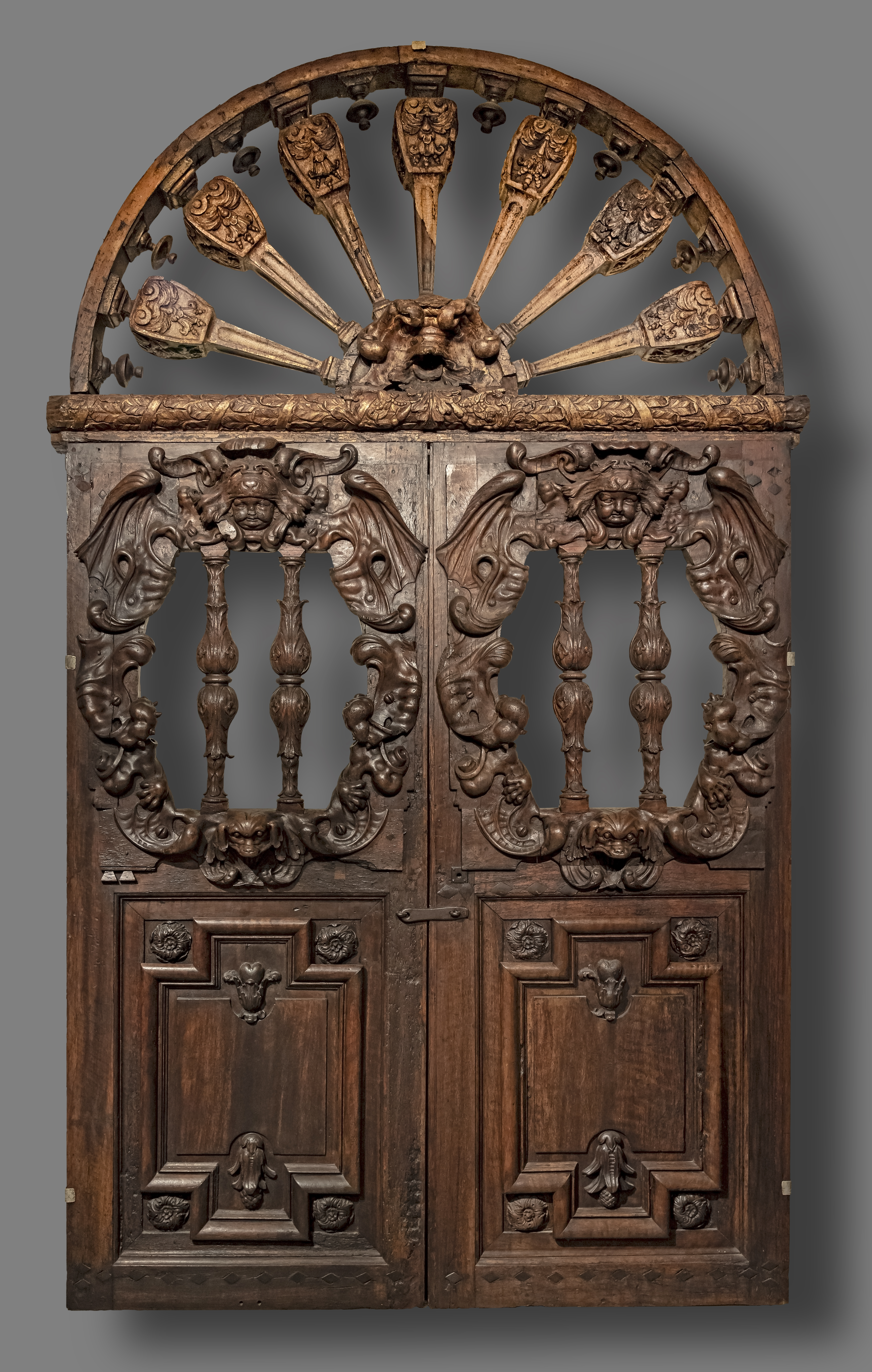
These carved wooden leaves accompanied the door of the Grand Consistory (1553) and can be seen in the Paul Dupuy Museum.

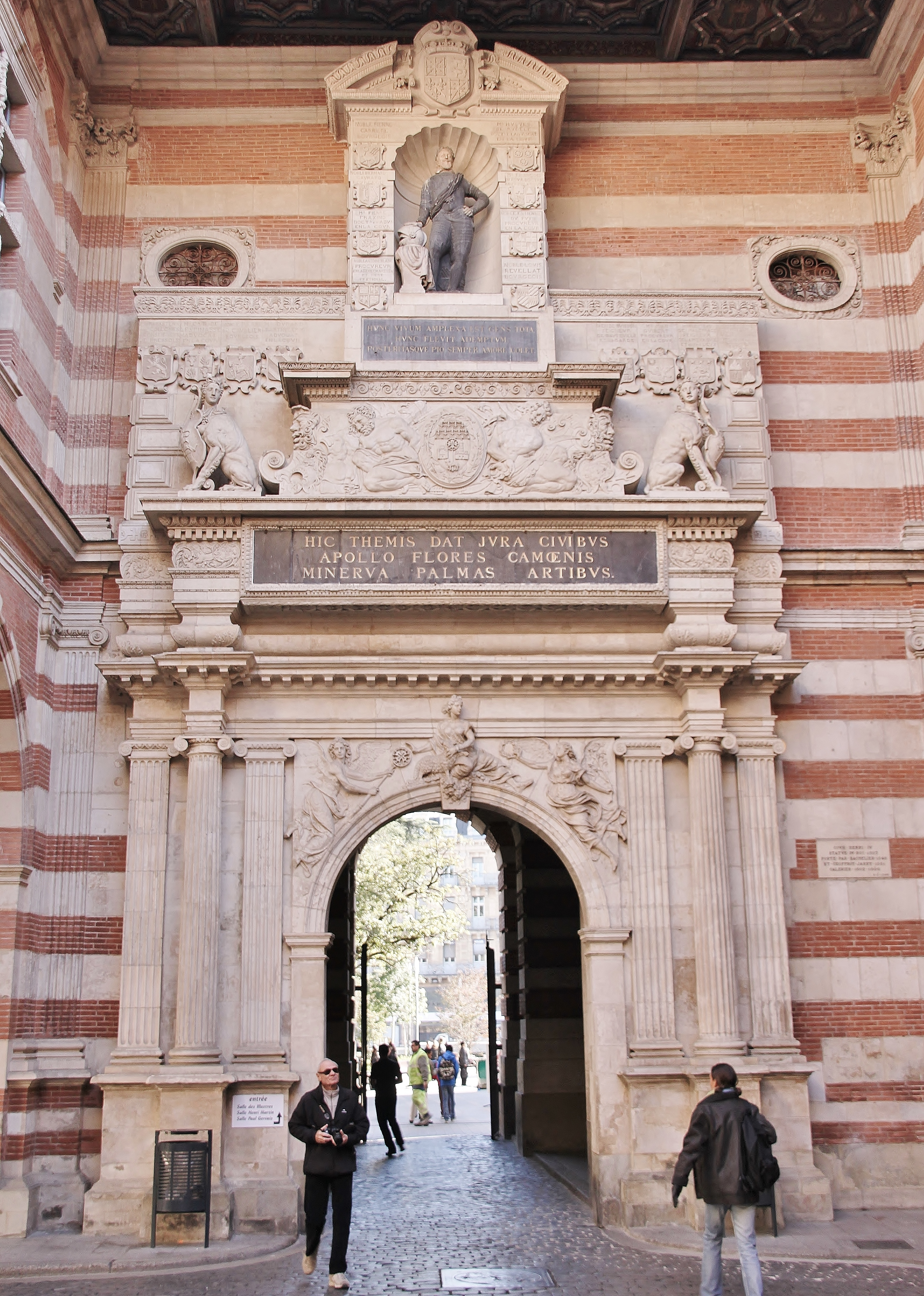
The triumphal portal of the Henri IV court of the Capitole (dates of construction of its three parts: 1546, 1561 and 1607).

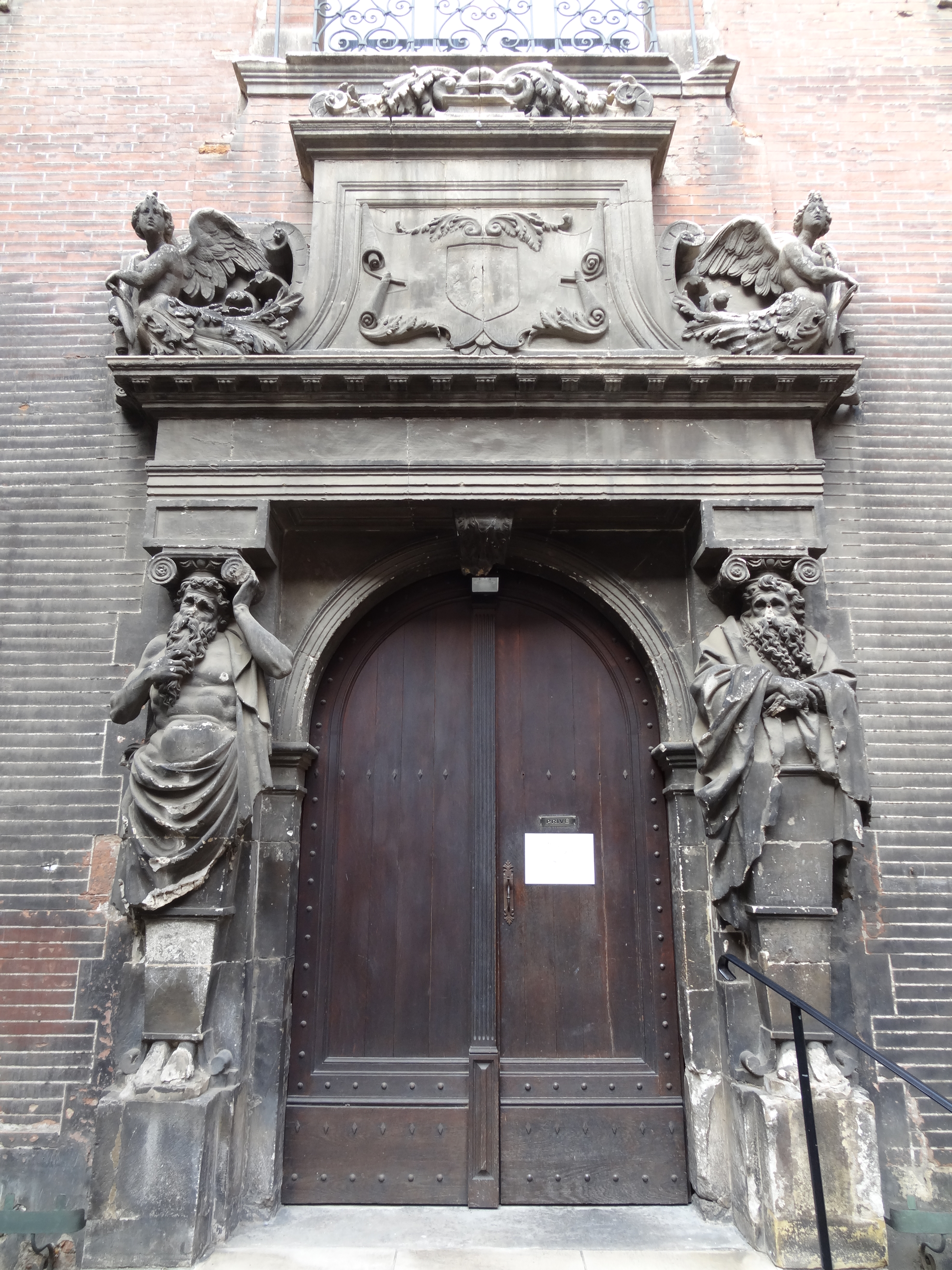
Gate with telamons in the courtyard of the Hotel de Bagis (1550s?)

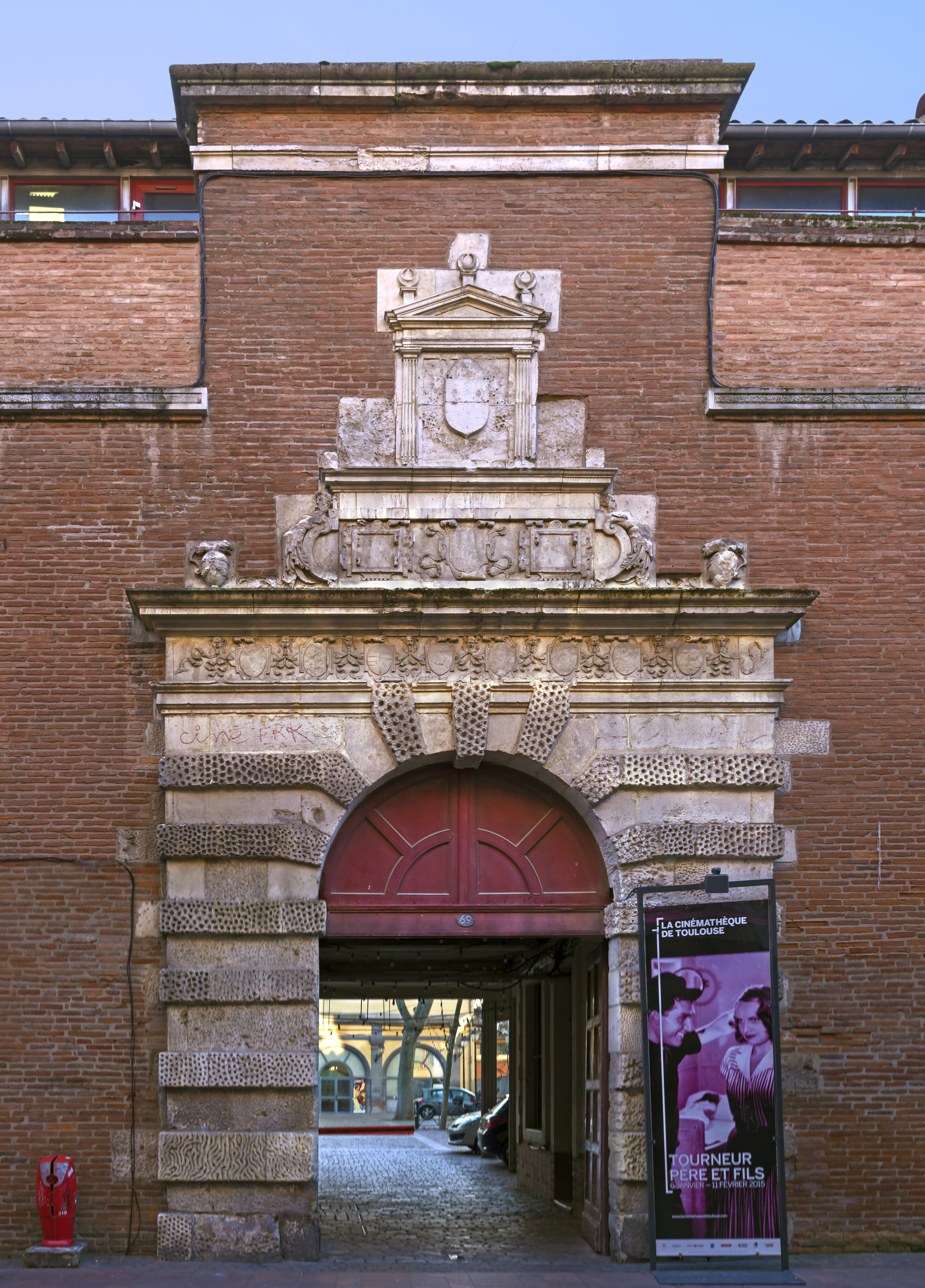
The portal of the former Esquile college is the work of Nicolas Bachelier (1556).

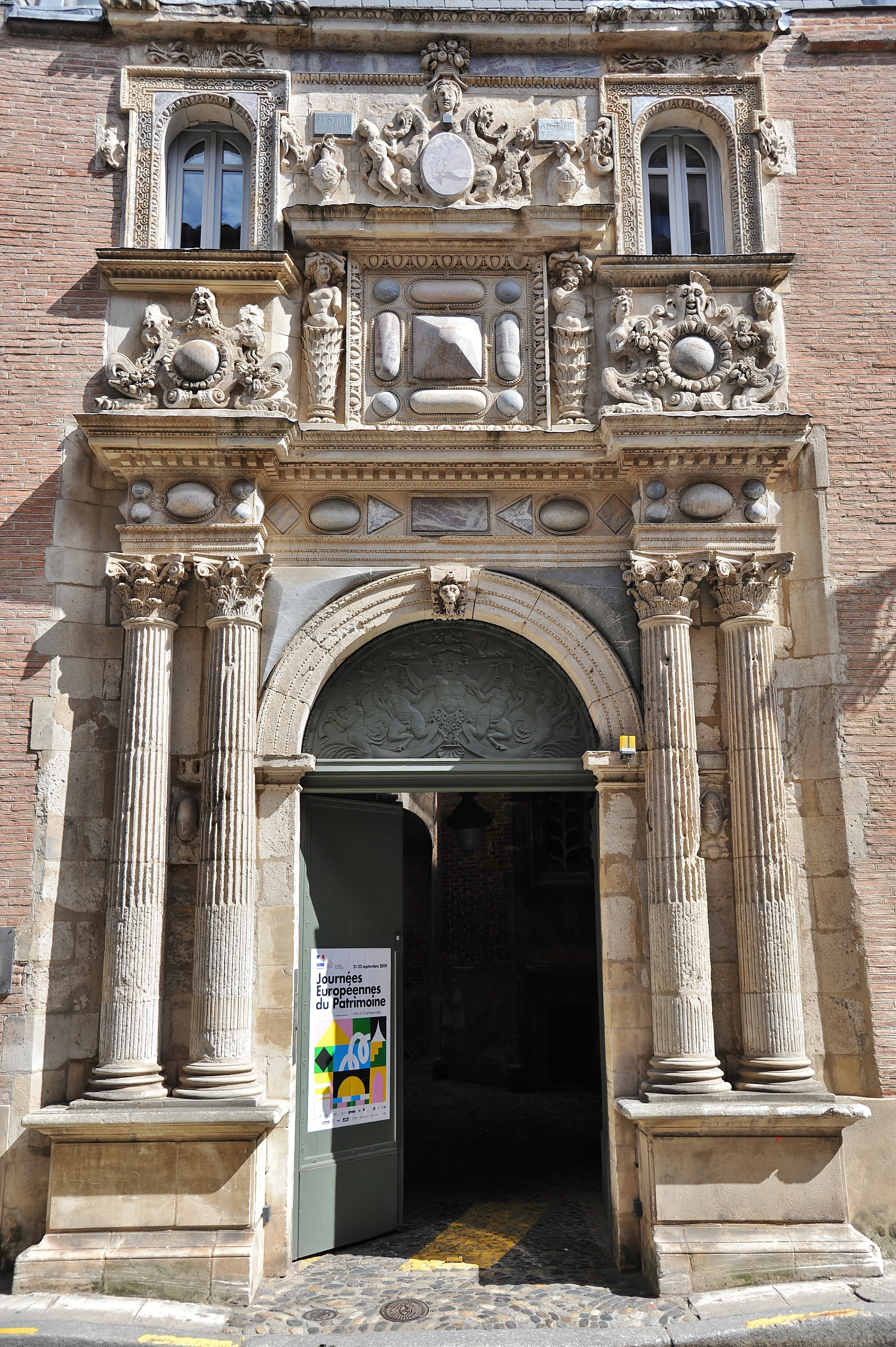
Portal of the Hôtel Molinier (or Hôtel de Felzins), 1556.

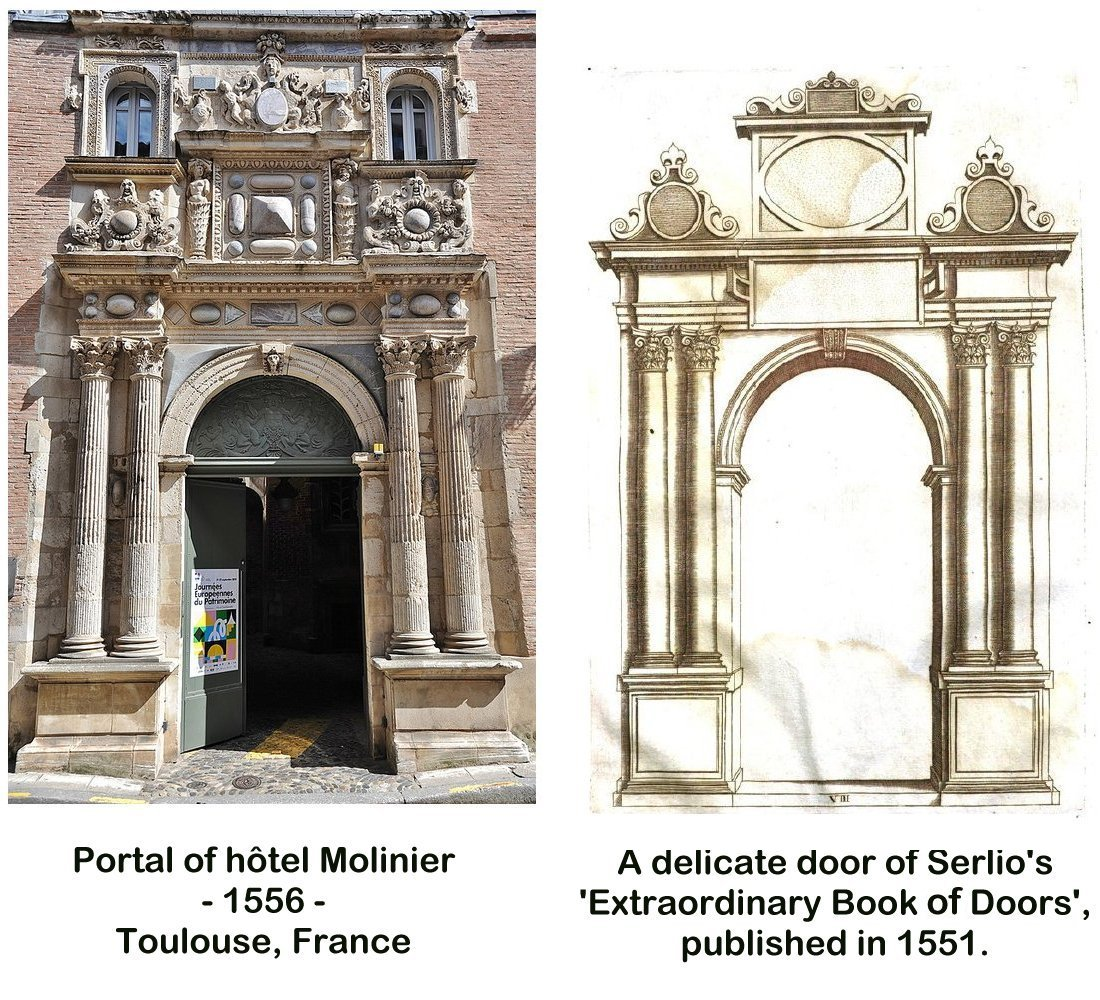
The portal of the Hôtel Molinier is inspired by an engraving from Sebastiano Serlio's Extraordinary Book.

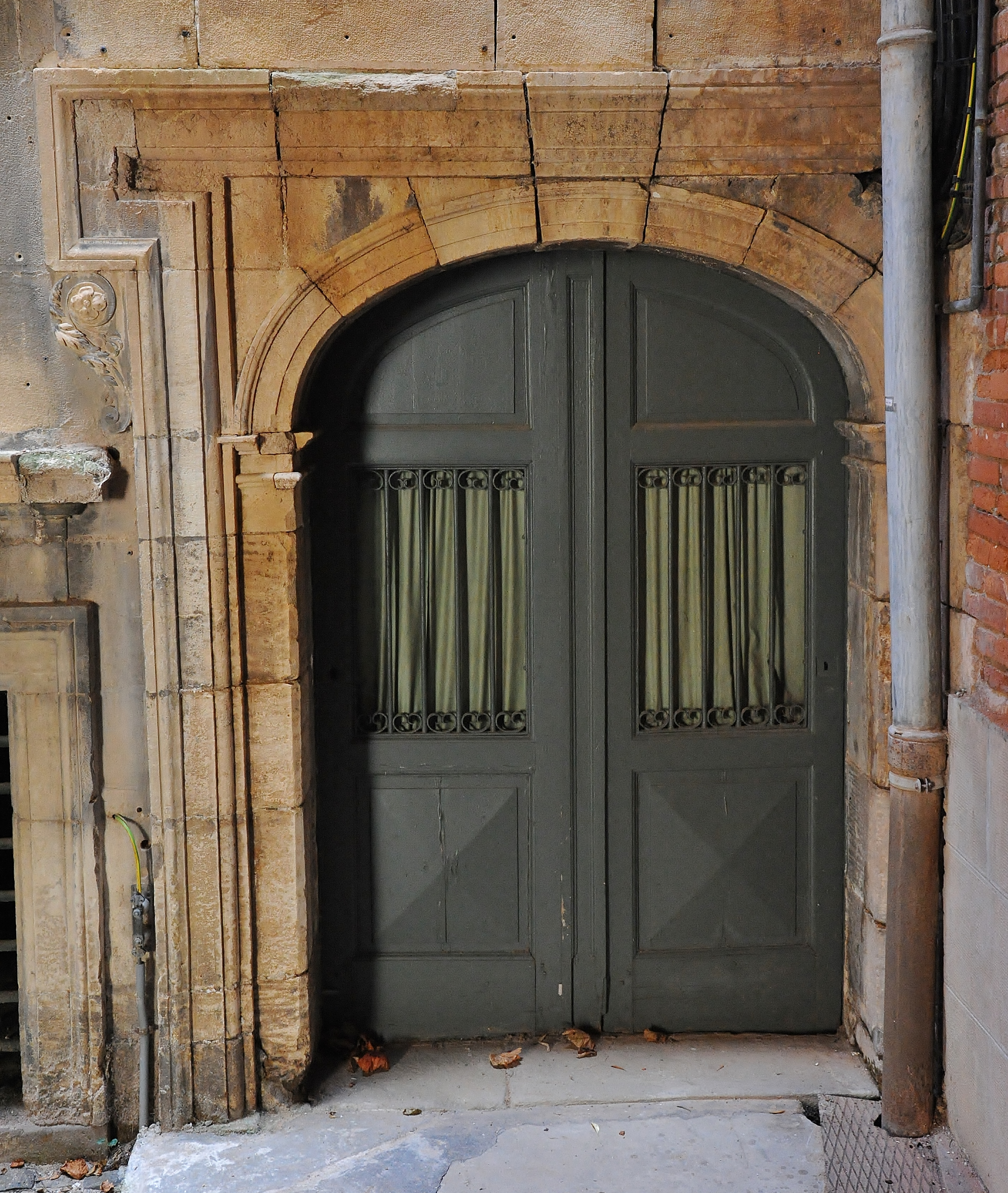
Small door to the Hôtel Molinier.

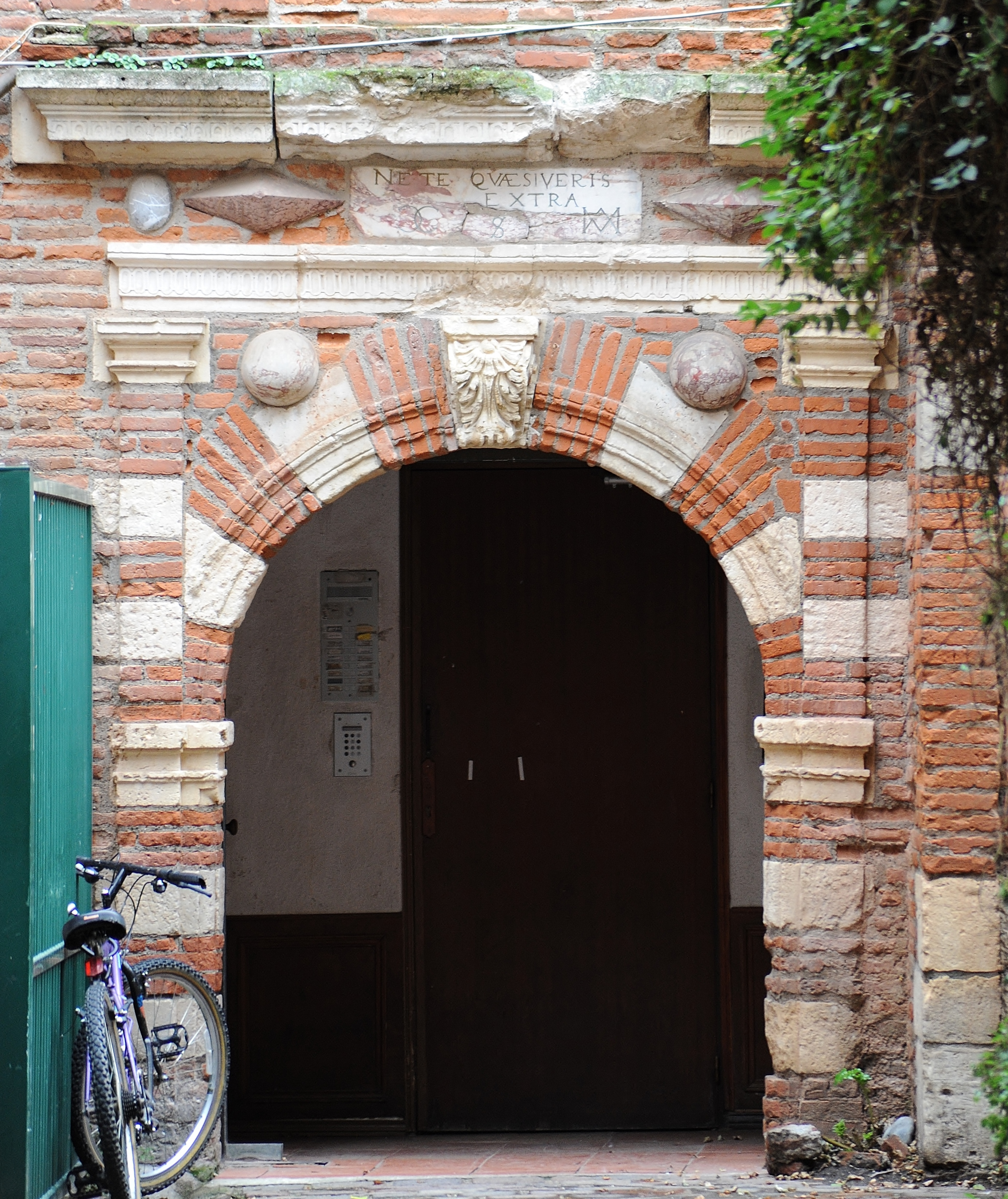
Door of the Hôtel d'Aymès (second half of the 16th century).

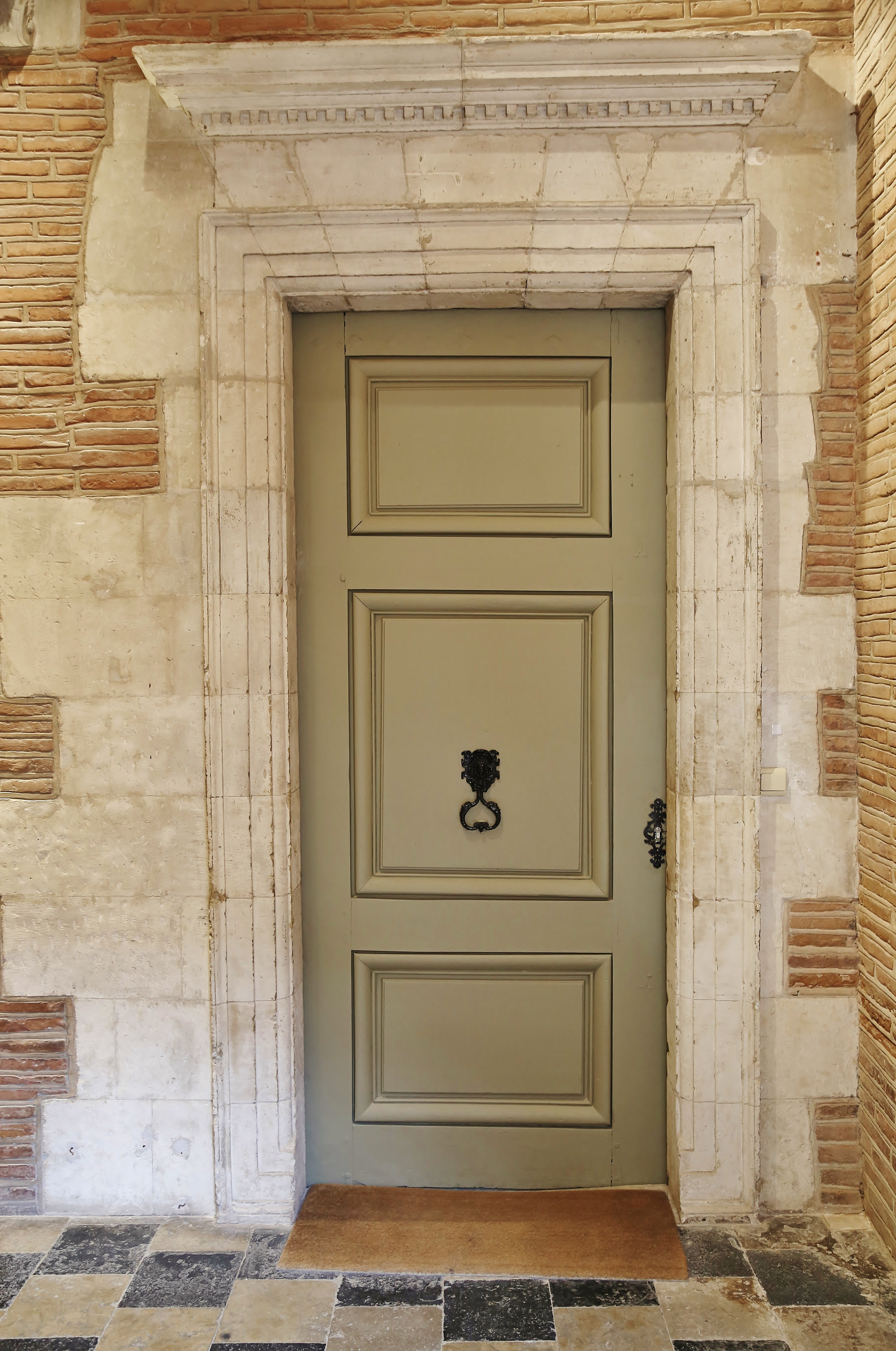
Interior door of the Hôtel d'Assézat (1555-1556, Nicolas Bachelier).

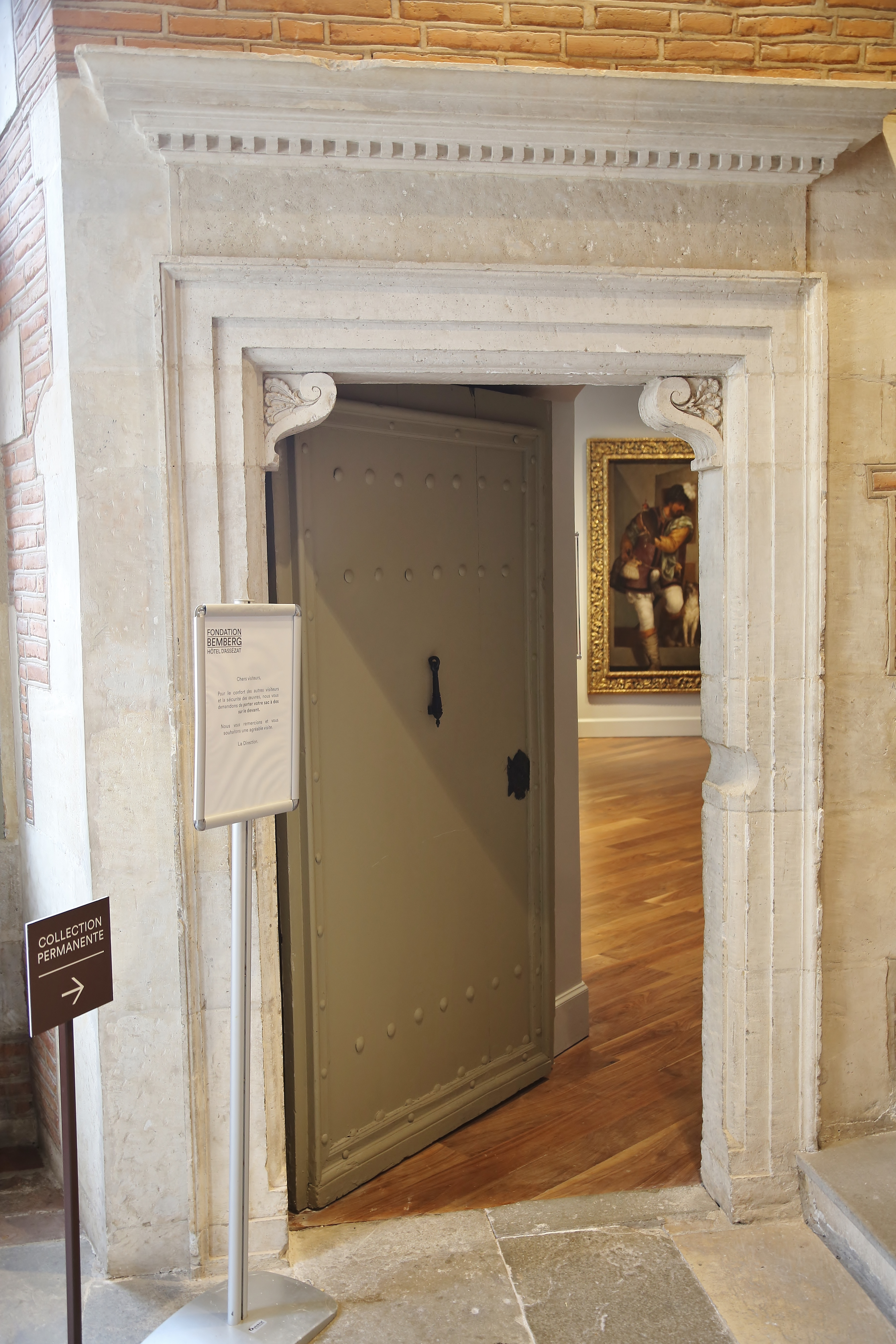
Interior door of the Hôtel d'Assézat (1555-1556, Nicolas Bachelier).

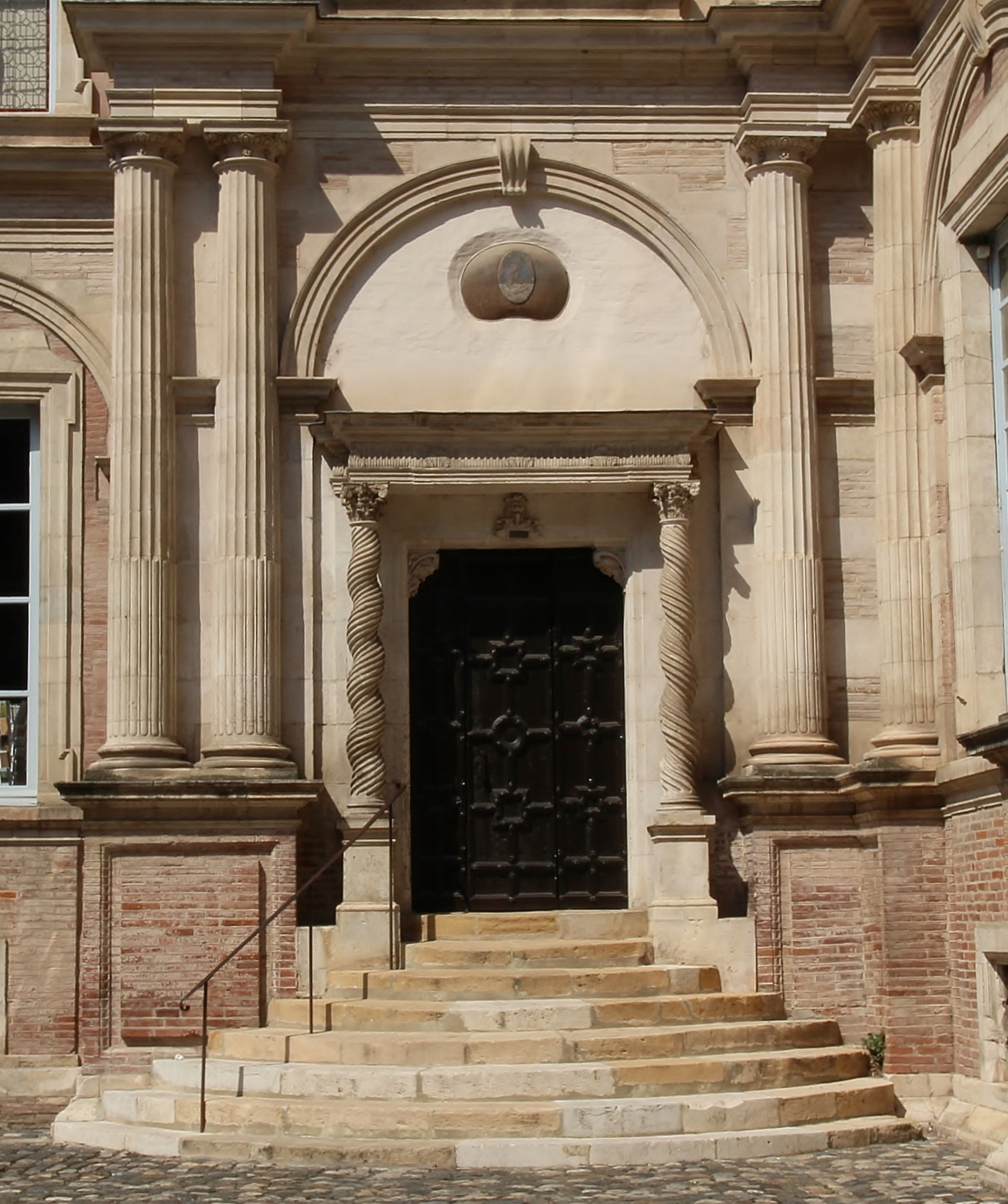
The door of the stair tower of the Hôtel d'Assézat (1555-1556, Nicolas Bachelier).

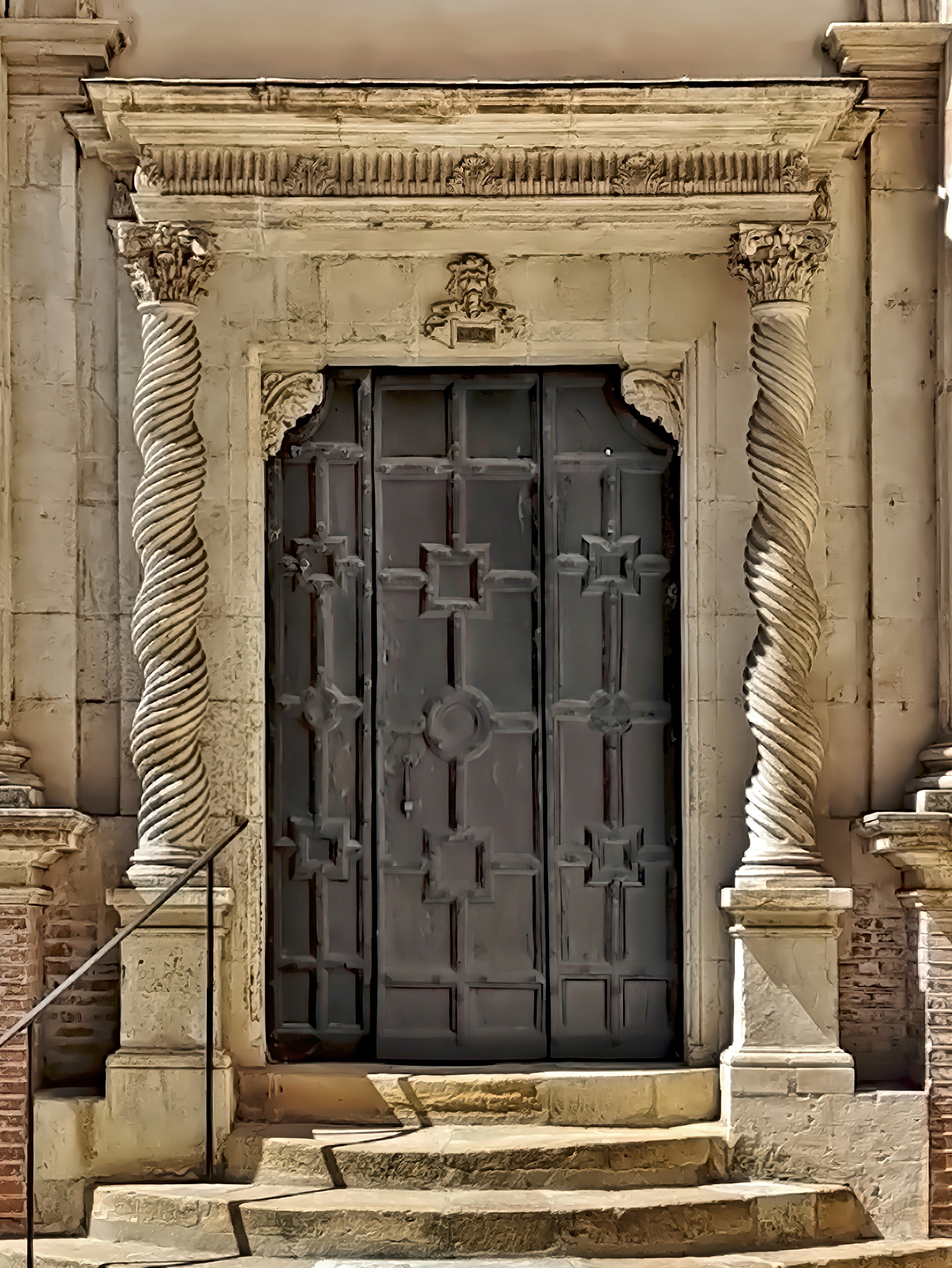
Detail of the previous photo (door of the Assézat stair tower).

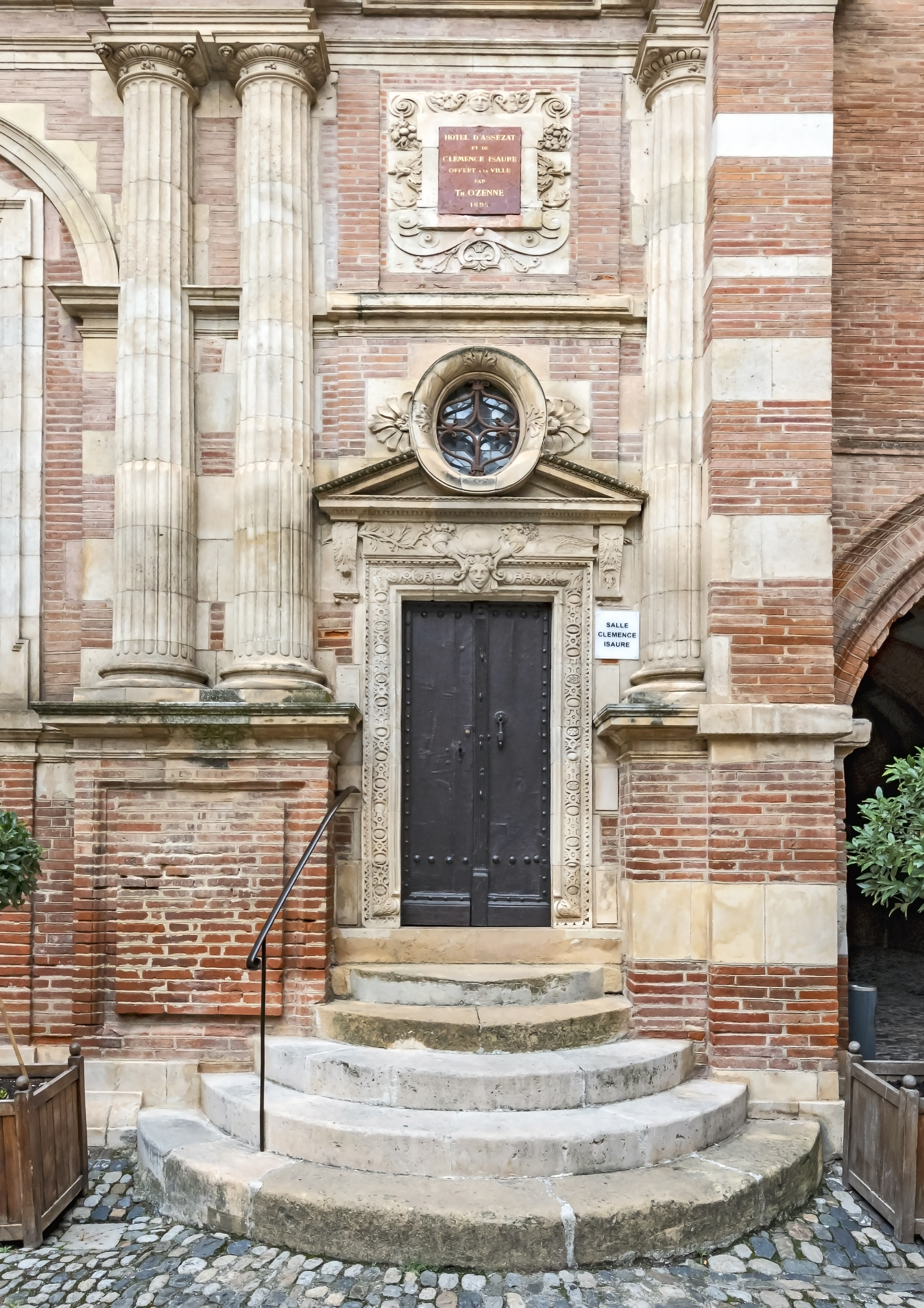
This door was that of the counter of the Hôtel d'Assézat.

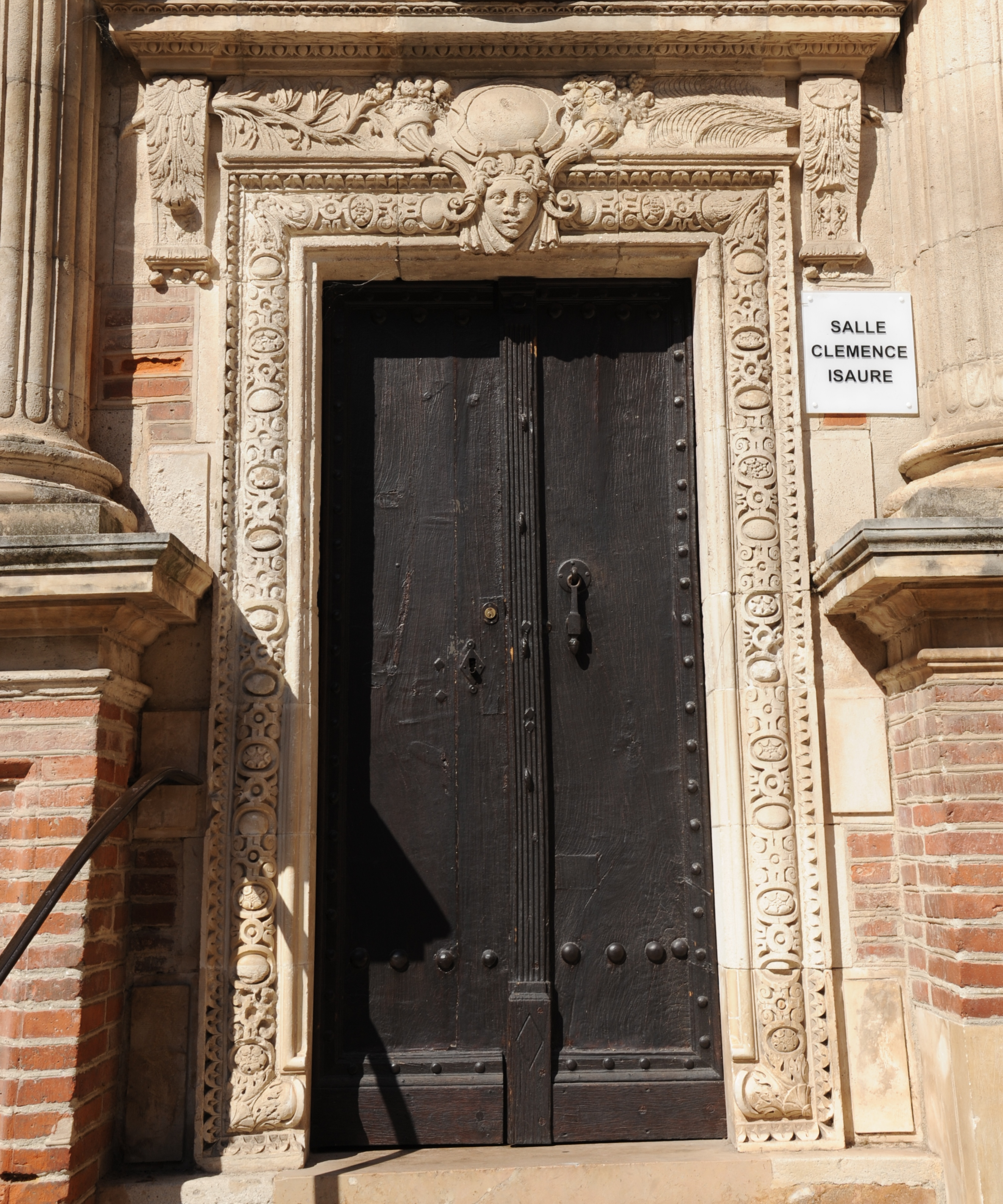
Detail of the previous photo (door of the counter of the Hôtel d'Assézat).

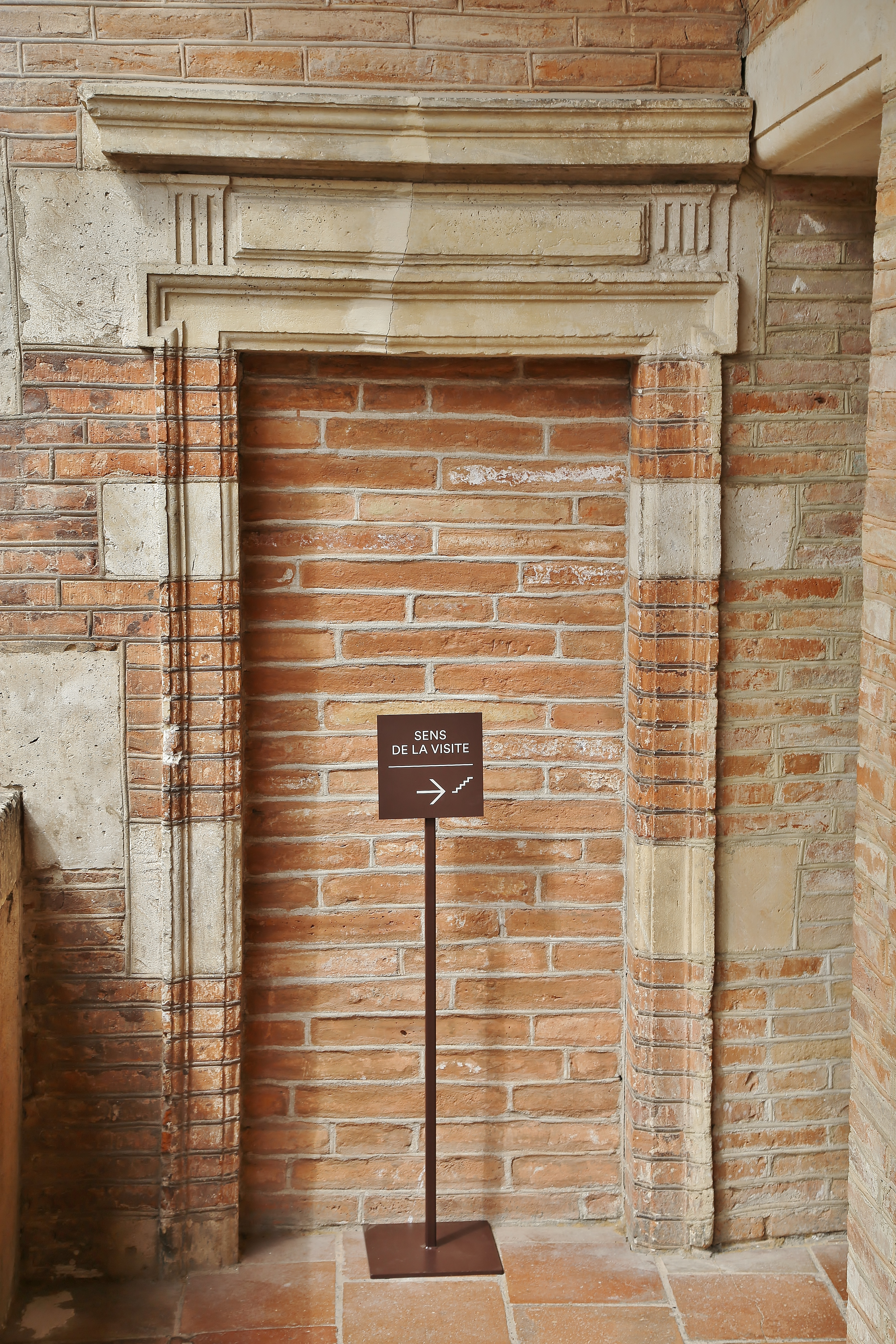
Walled door at the Hôtel d'Assézat (1560-1562, Dominique Bachelier).

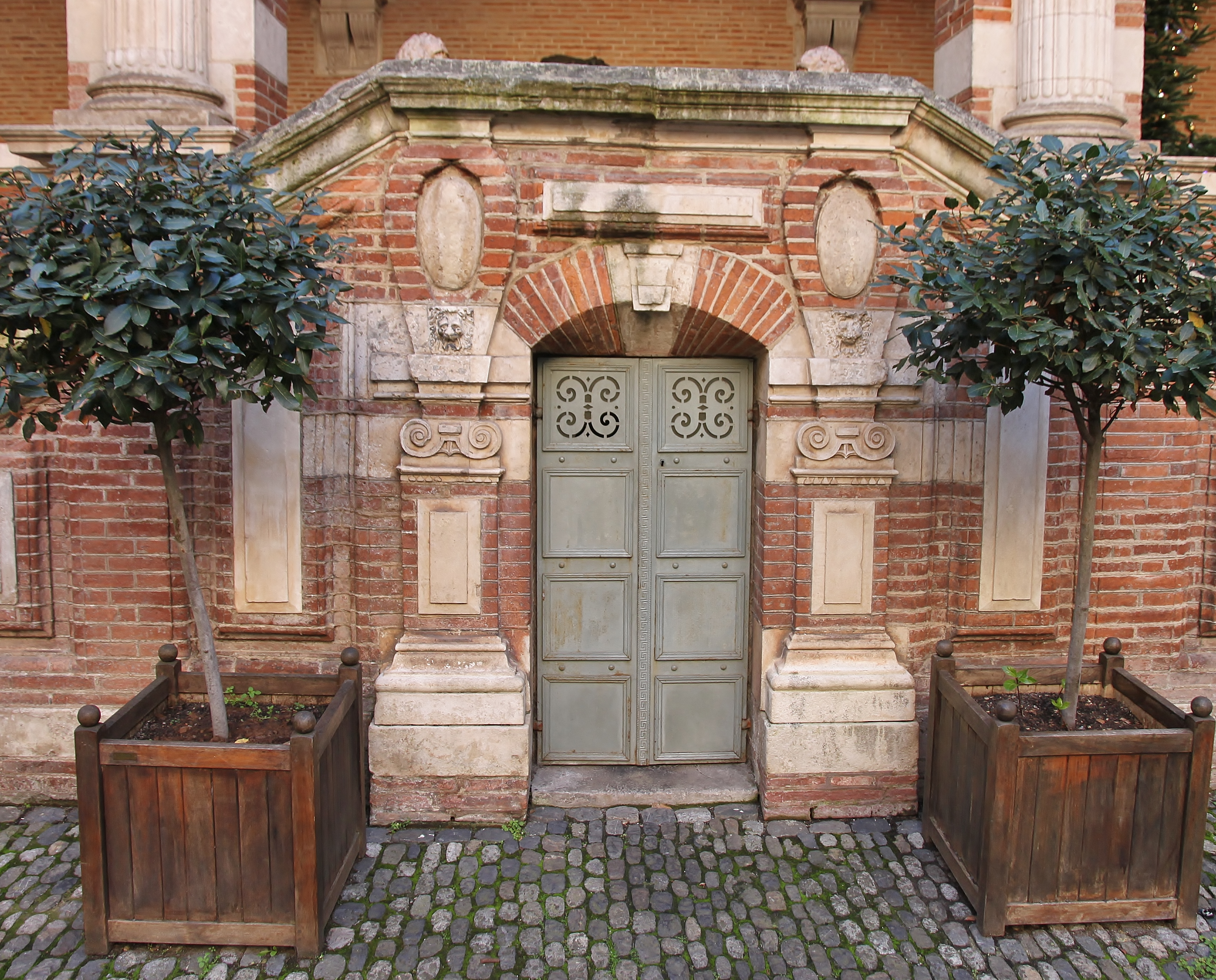
This small door opening under the stairs of the loggia of the Hôtel d'Assézat leads to the semi-buried cellars.

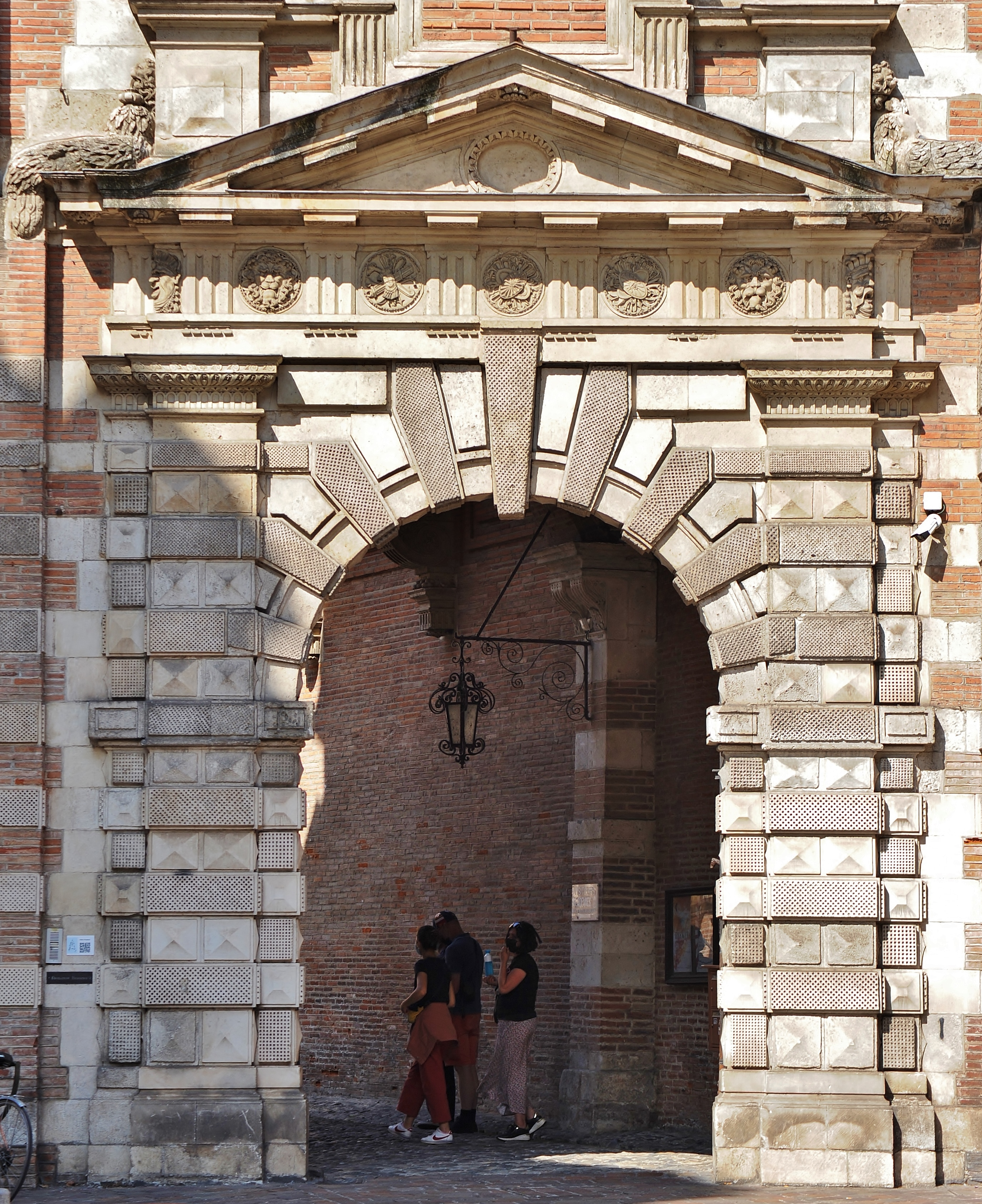
The large portal of the Hôtel d'Assézat is the work of Dominique Bachelier (1560-1562).

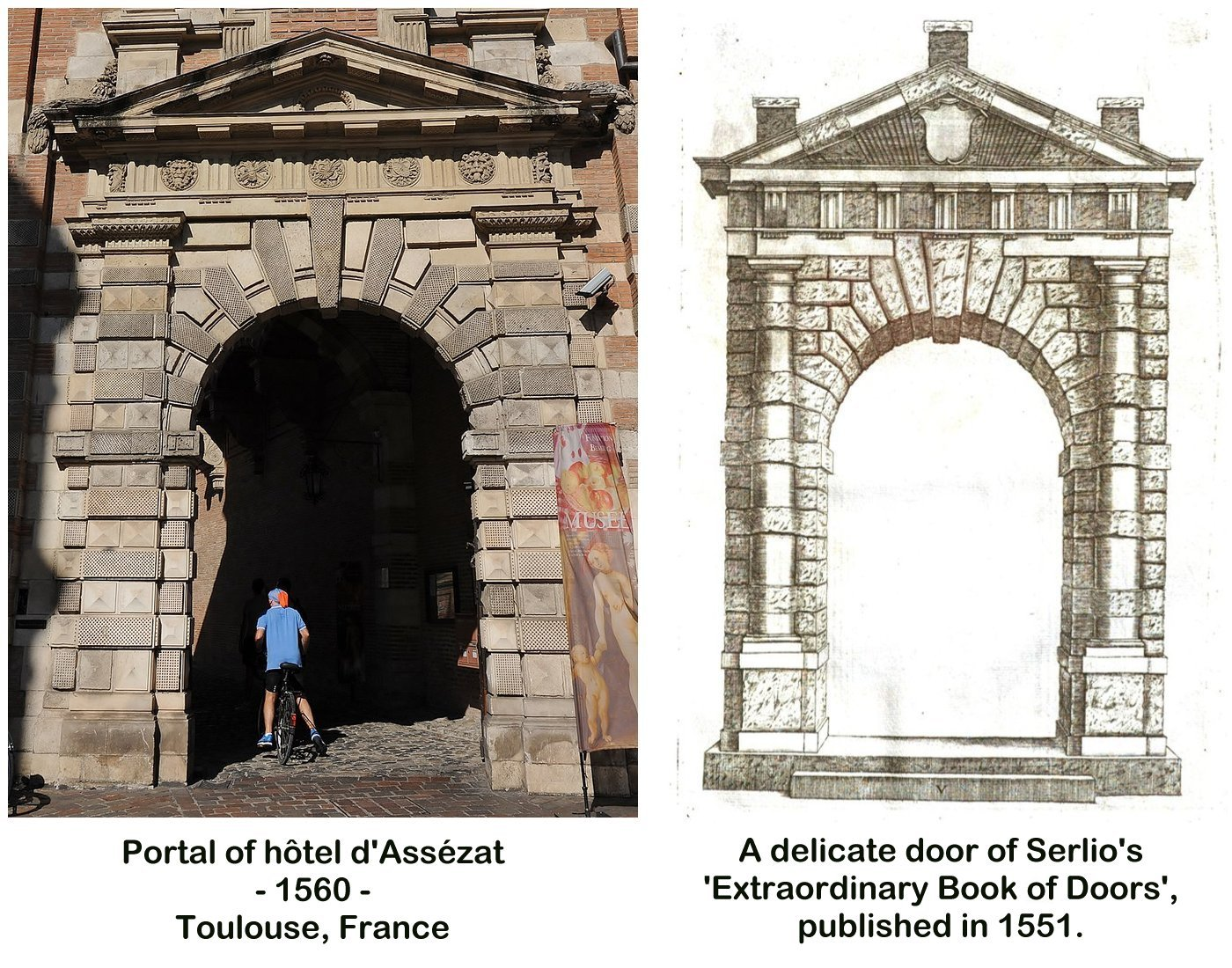
It is the delicate door 5 of Serlio's Extraordinary Book that gave the general design of the portal of the Hôtel d'Assézat.

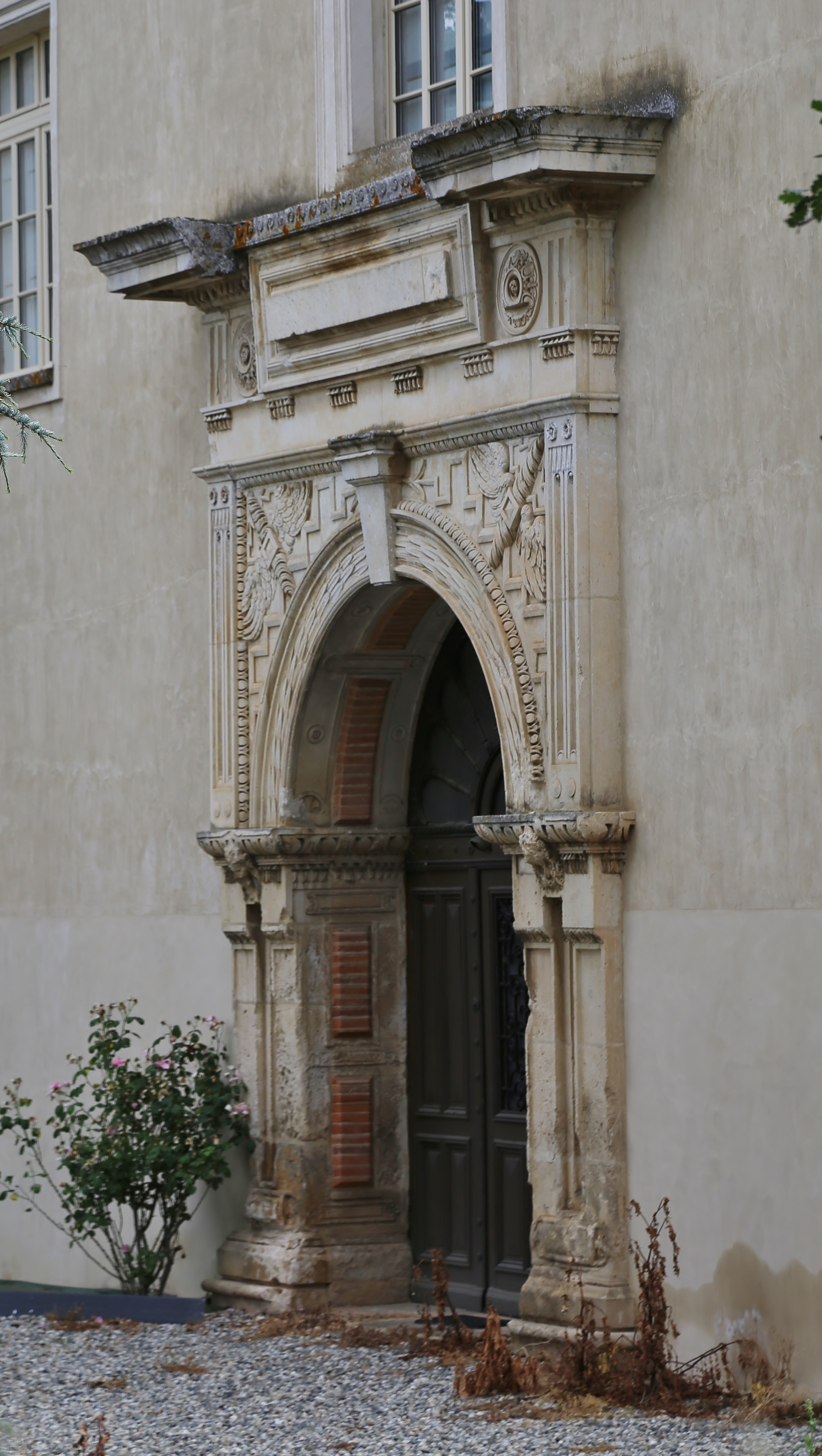
Door of the west facade of the Saint-Jory castle (circa 1560).

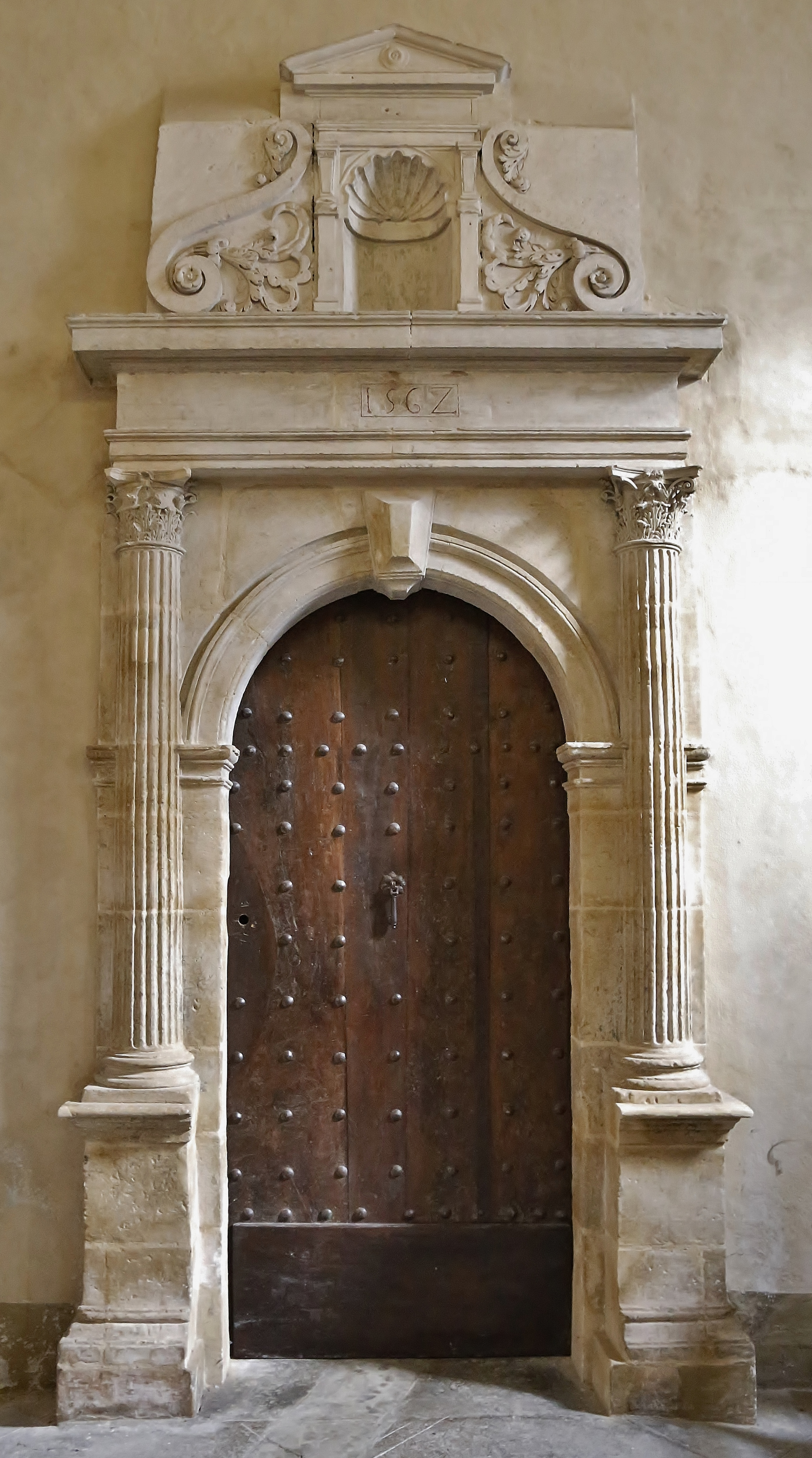
Saint-Nicolas church, interior door (1562).

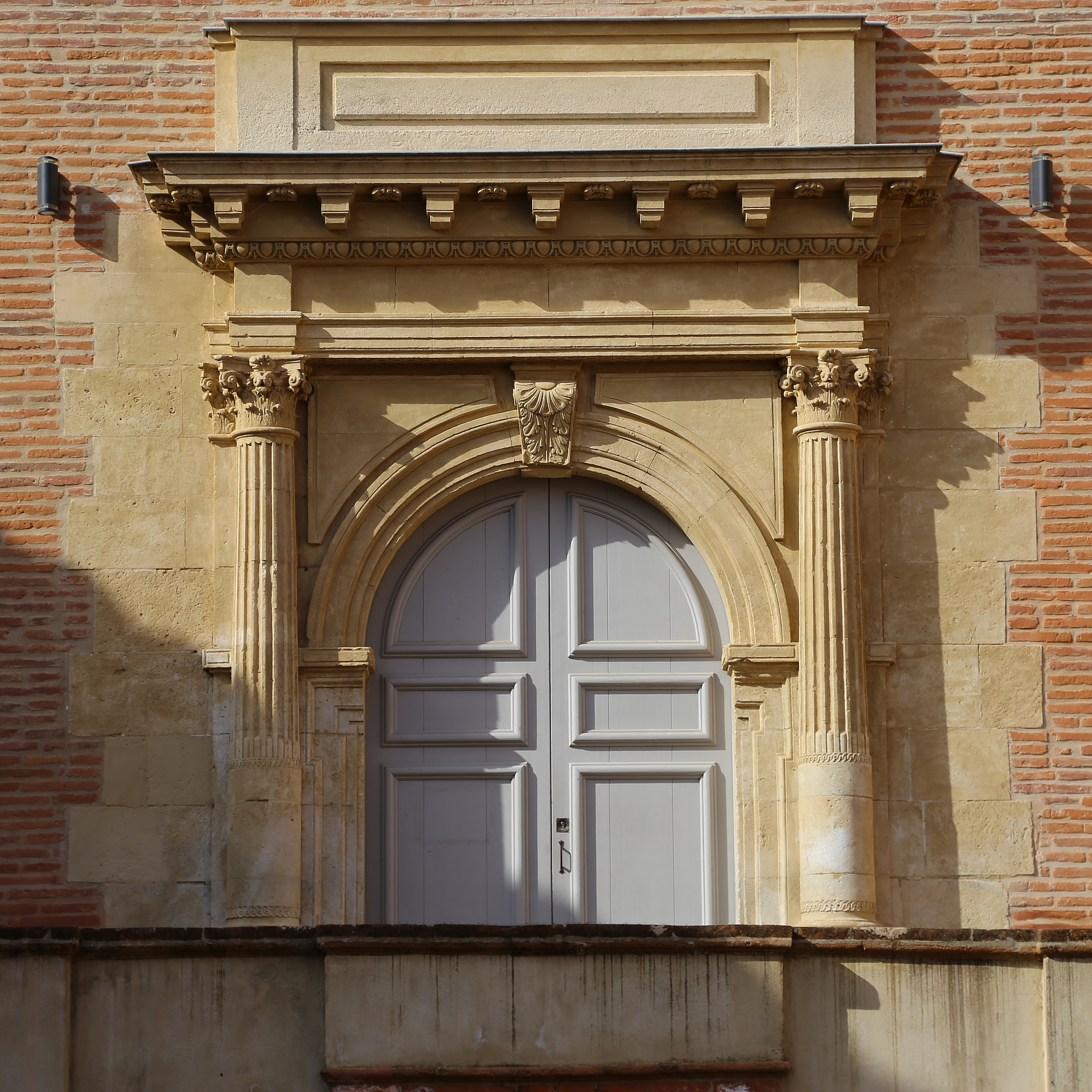
Door of the castle of Lacroix-Falgarde (after 1574, Dominique Bachelier?).

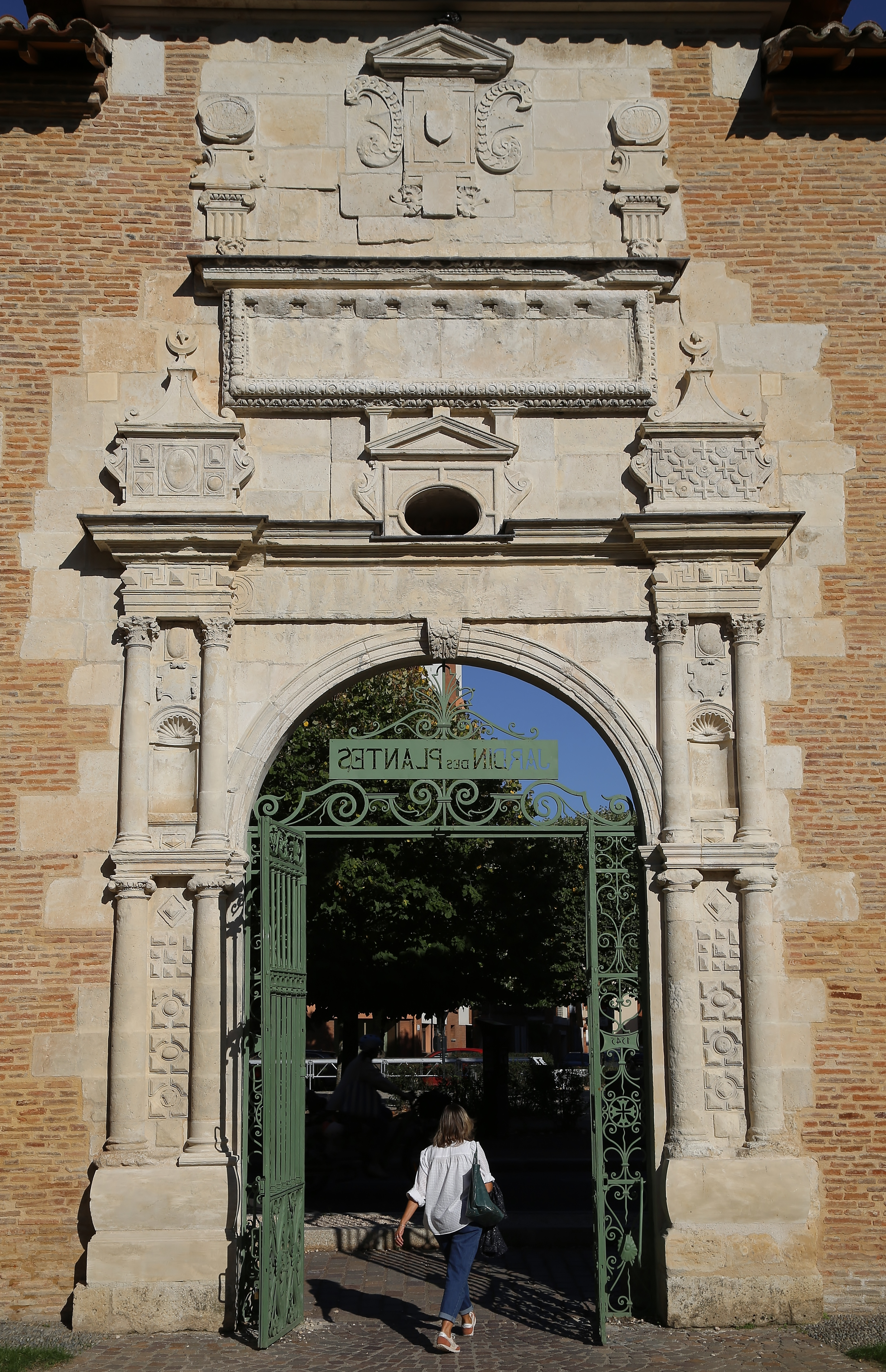
This door of the former Capitole, known as the Gate of the Commutation (1575, Jean Aleman), has been reassembled in the Jardin des Plantes.

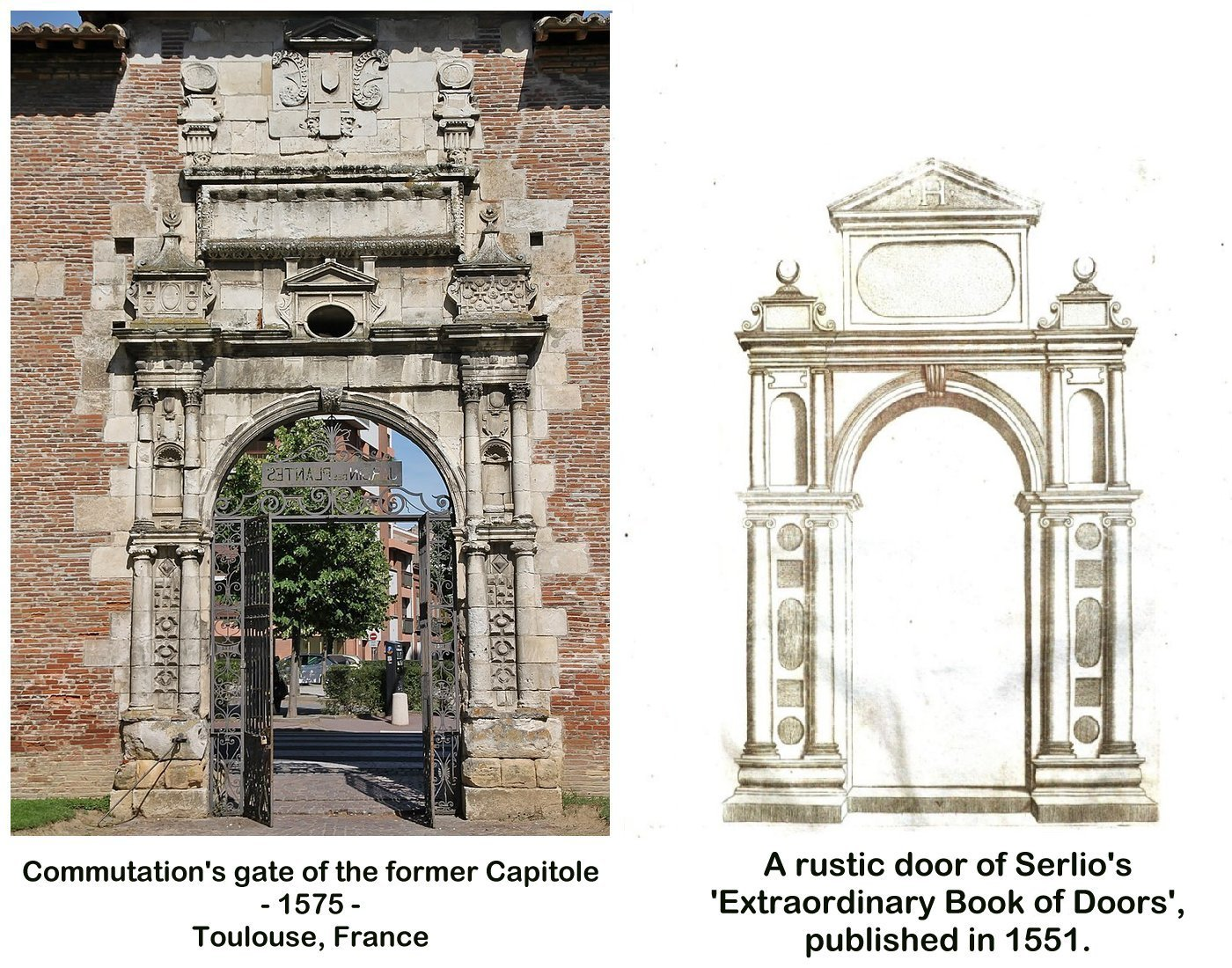
The door of the Commutation of the former Capitole is inspired by a rustic door from the Extraordinary Book by Sebastiano Serlio.

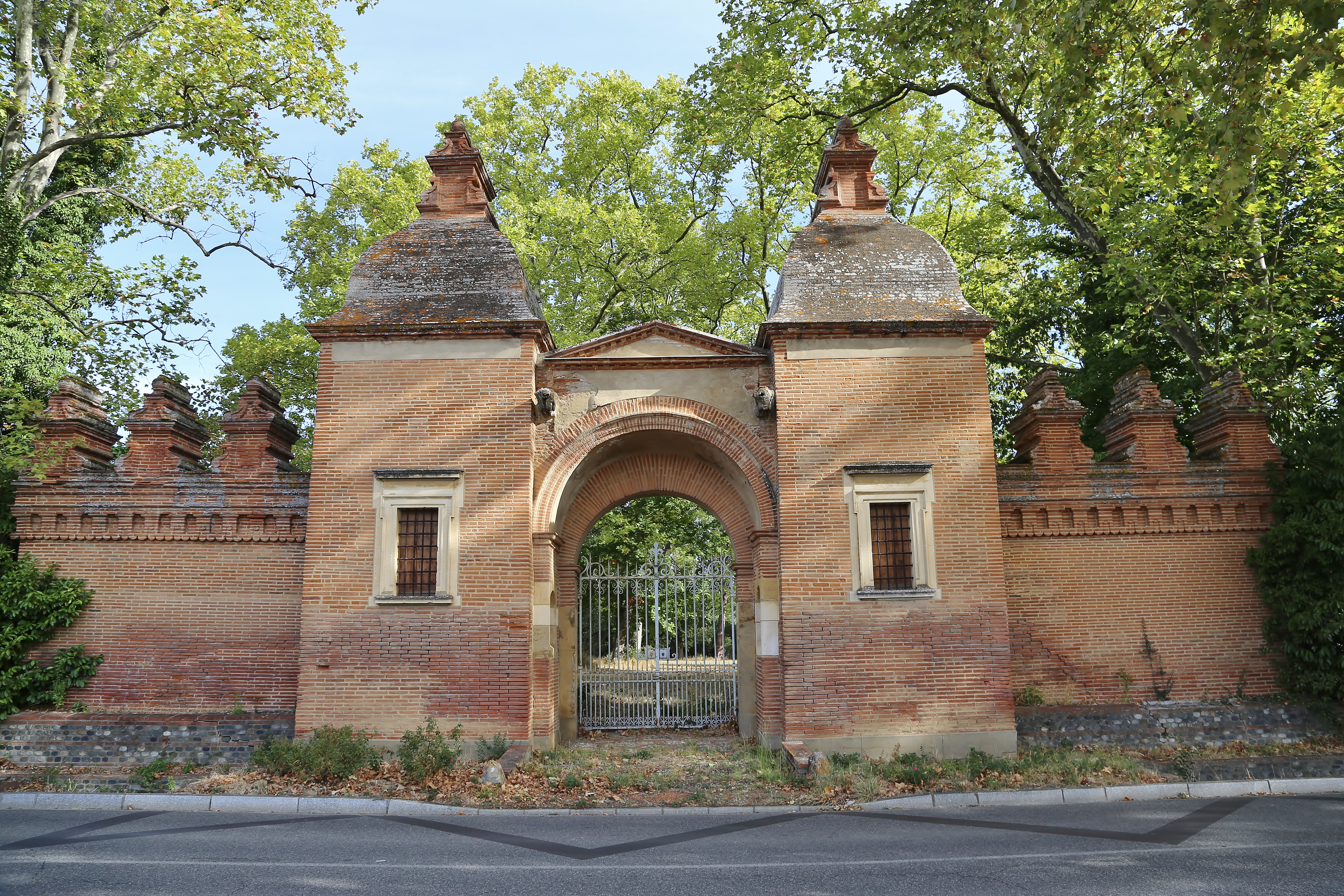
Henry IV portal of the castle of Pibrac.

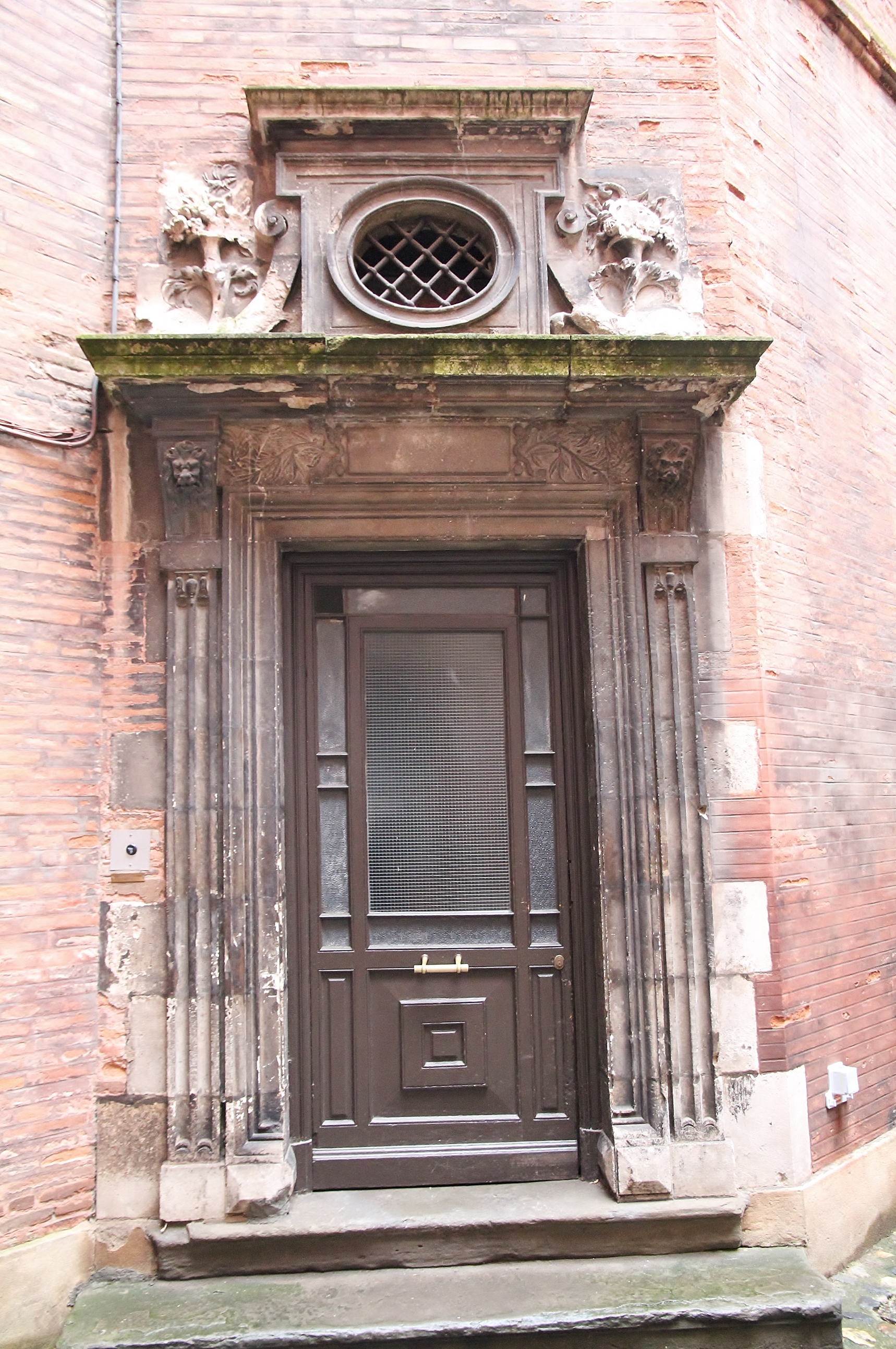
Gate in the courtyard of the Hôtel de Massas (or Hôtel d'Aldéguier), last quarter of the 16th century.

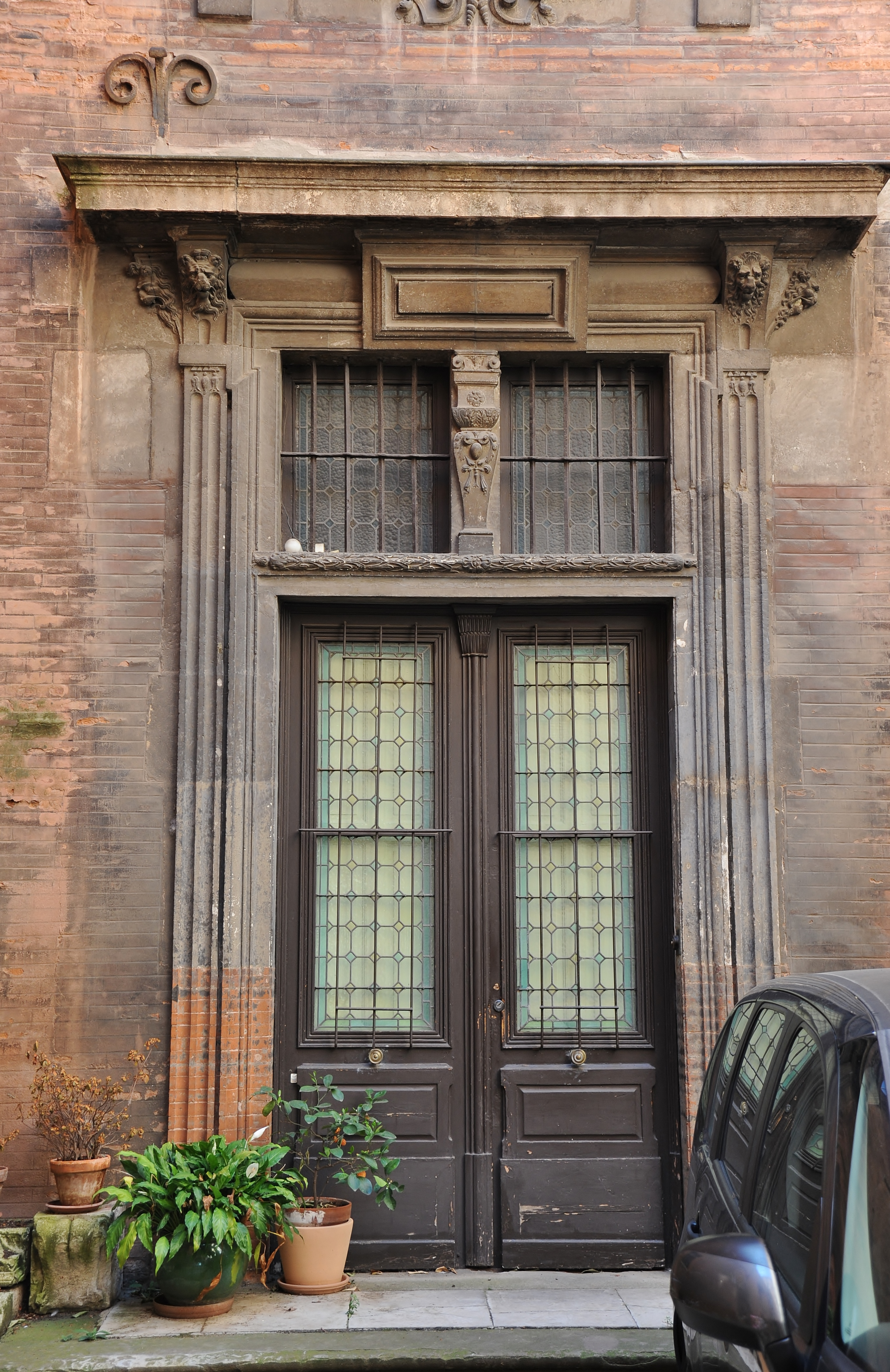
This door in the courtyard of the Hôtel de Massas is actually a window from the last quarter of the 16th century transformed into a door in the 19th century.

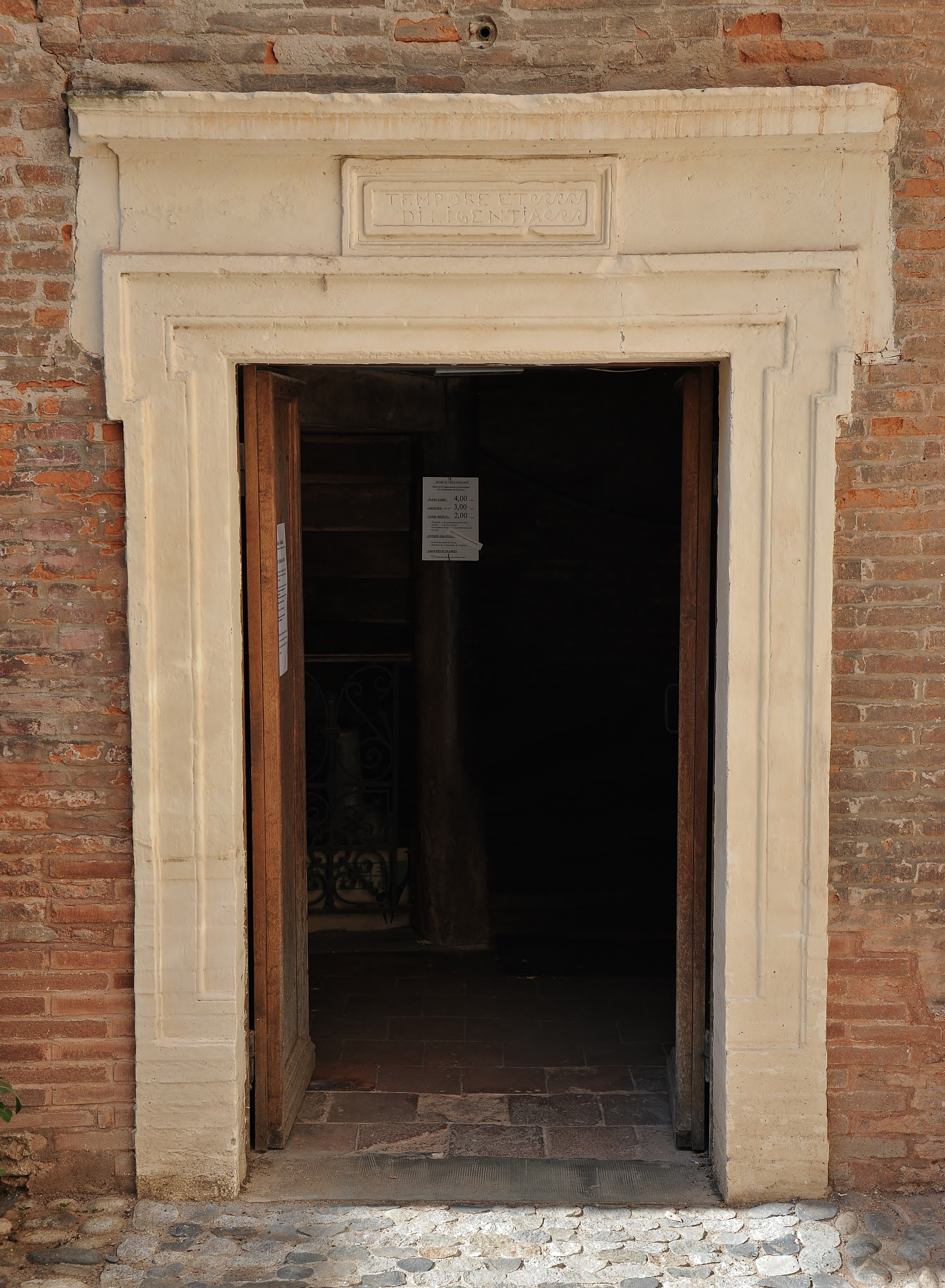
Door of the Hôtel Dumay.

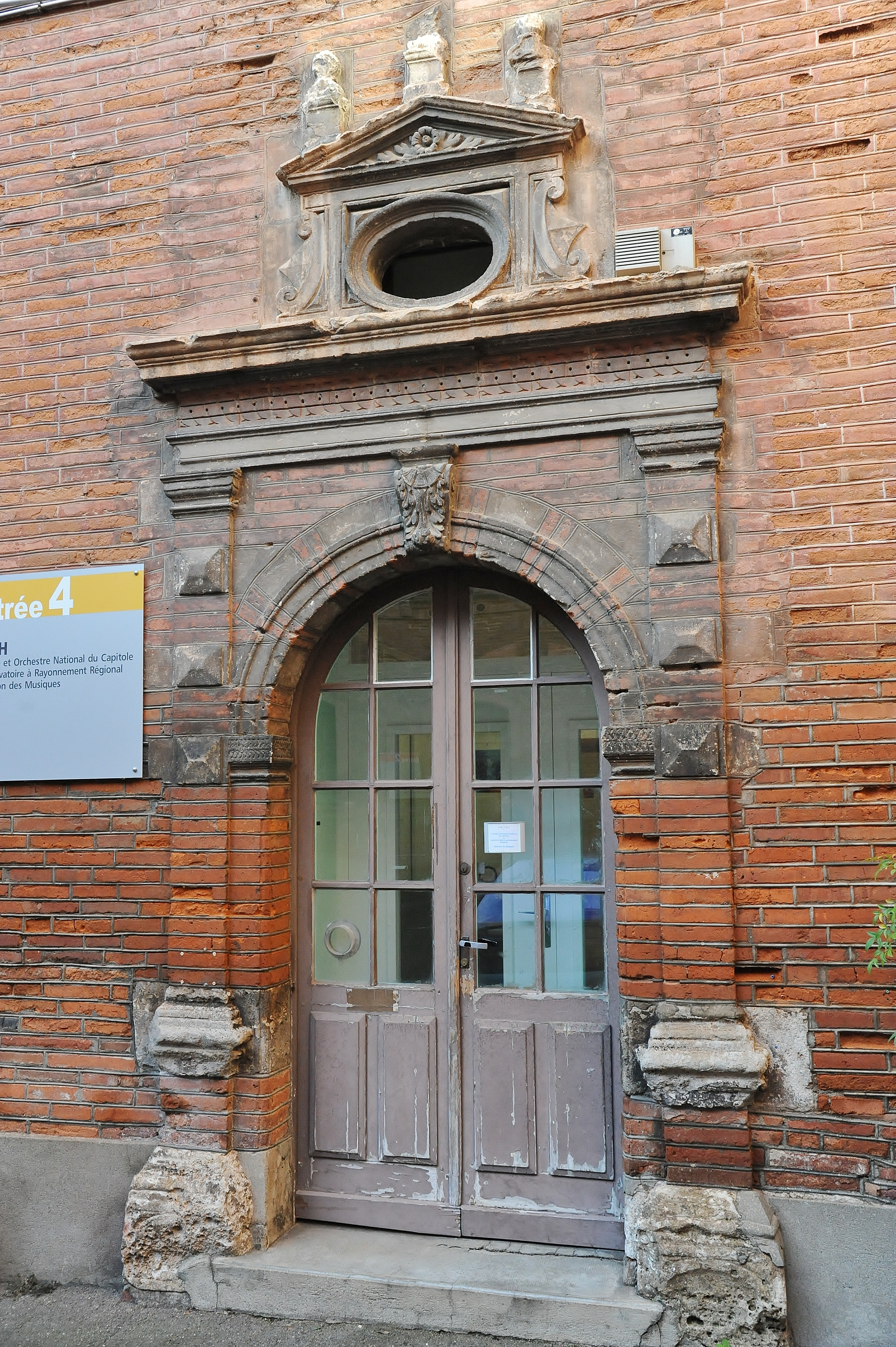
Door of the former Hôtel de Vesa (last quarter of the 16th century?), destroyed during the creation of Ozenne street.

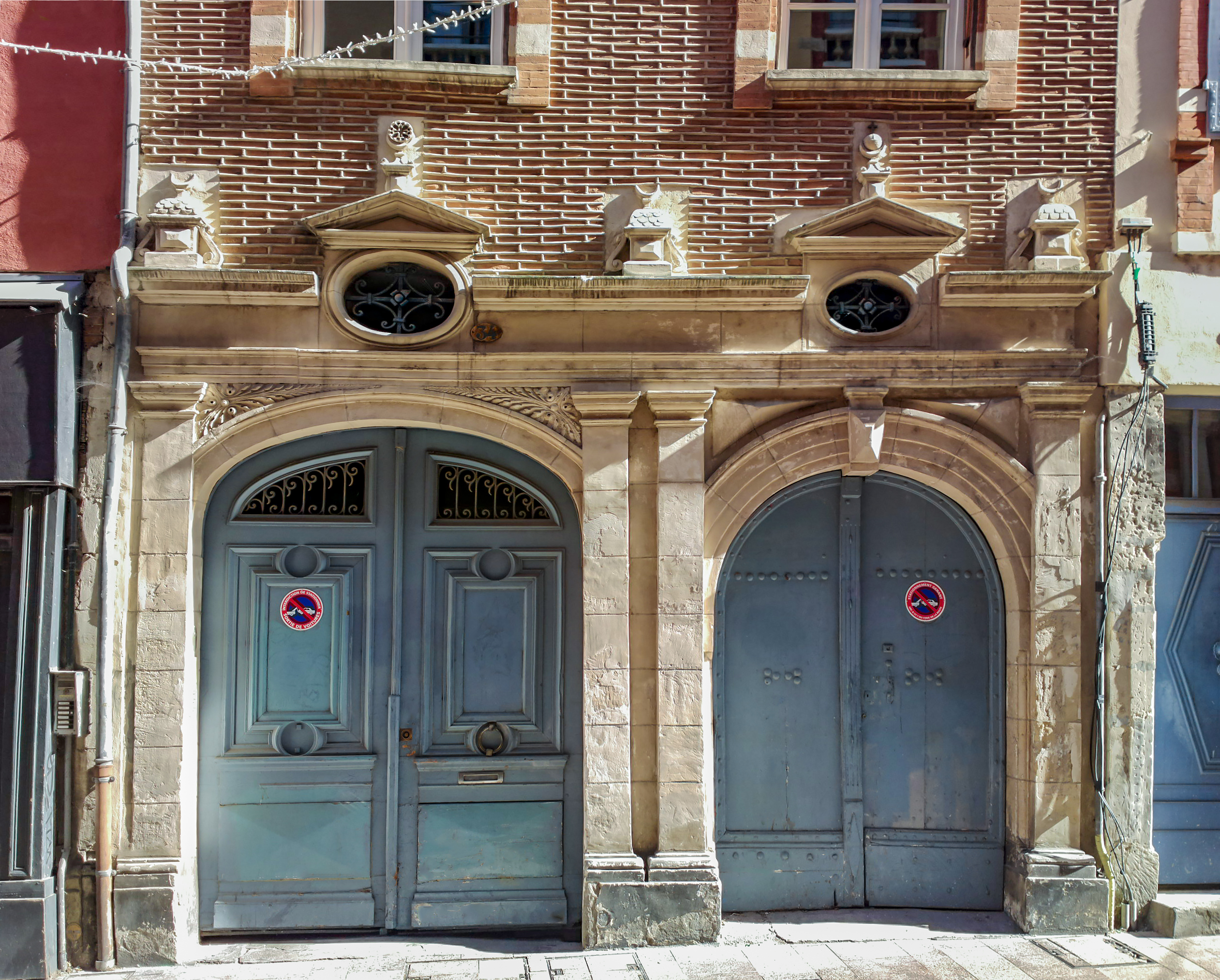
Portals of the Hôtel de Lagorrée. The one on the right is dated from the end of the 16th century, the one on the left from the beginning of the 17th century.

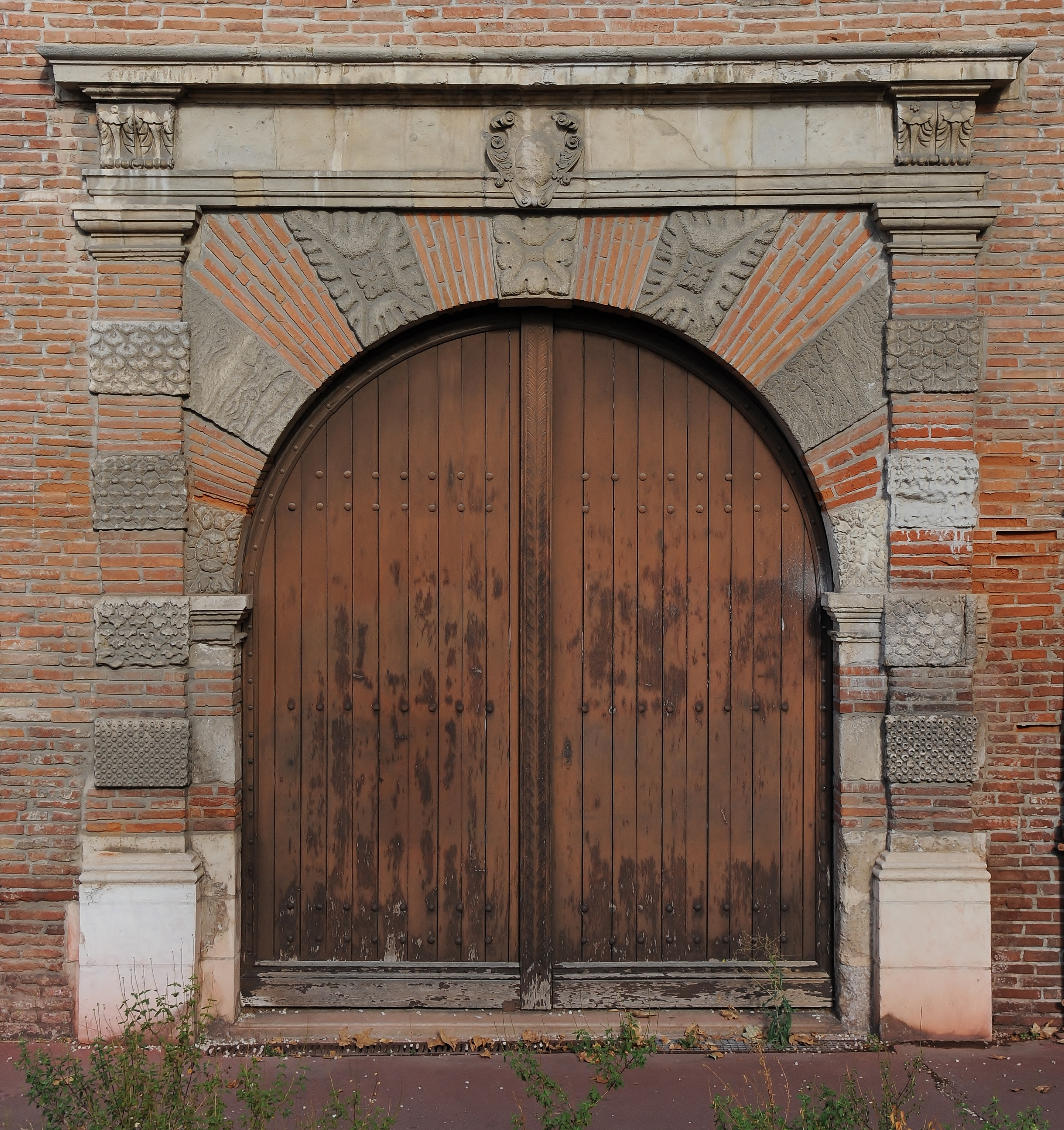
Portal of the Hôtel de Lestang, late 16th/early 17th century.

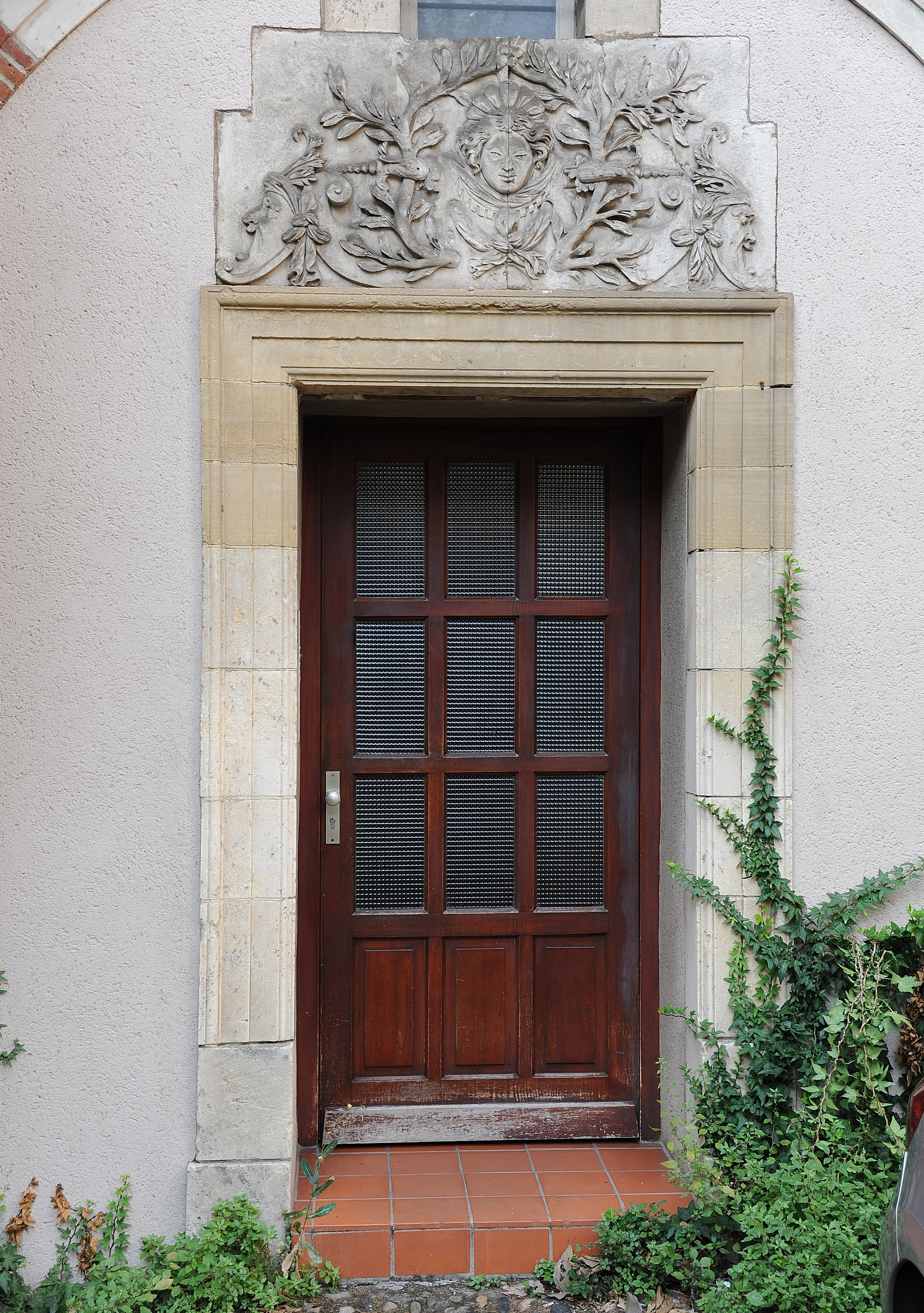
Door of the Hôtel Potier-Laterrasse, late 16th or early 17th century.

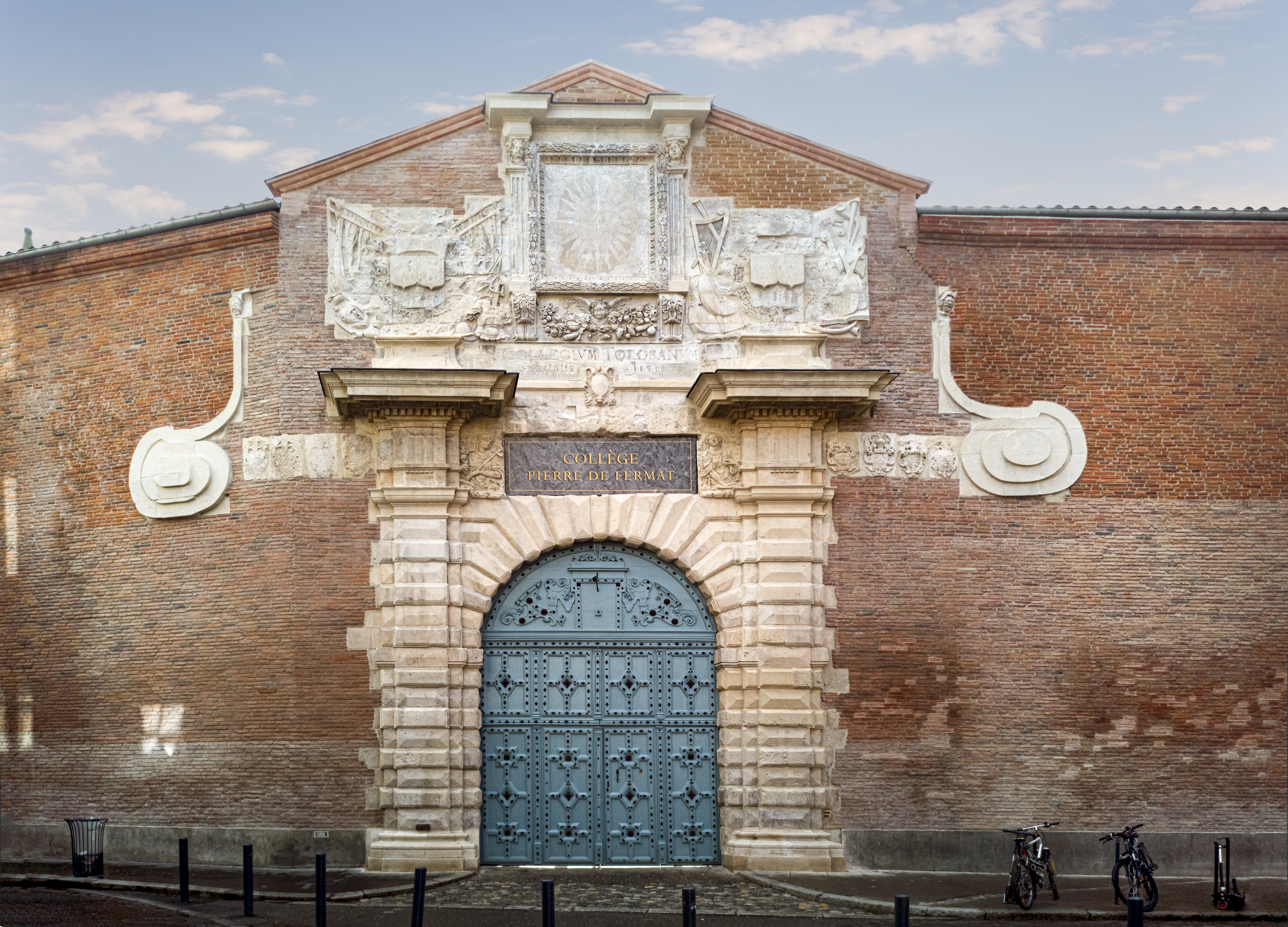
Large portal of the former Jesuit college (1604 or 1605).

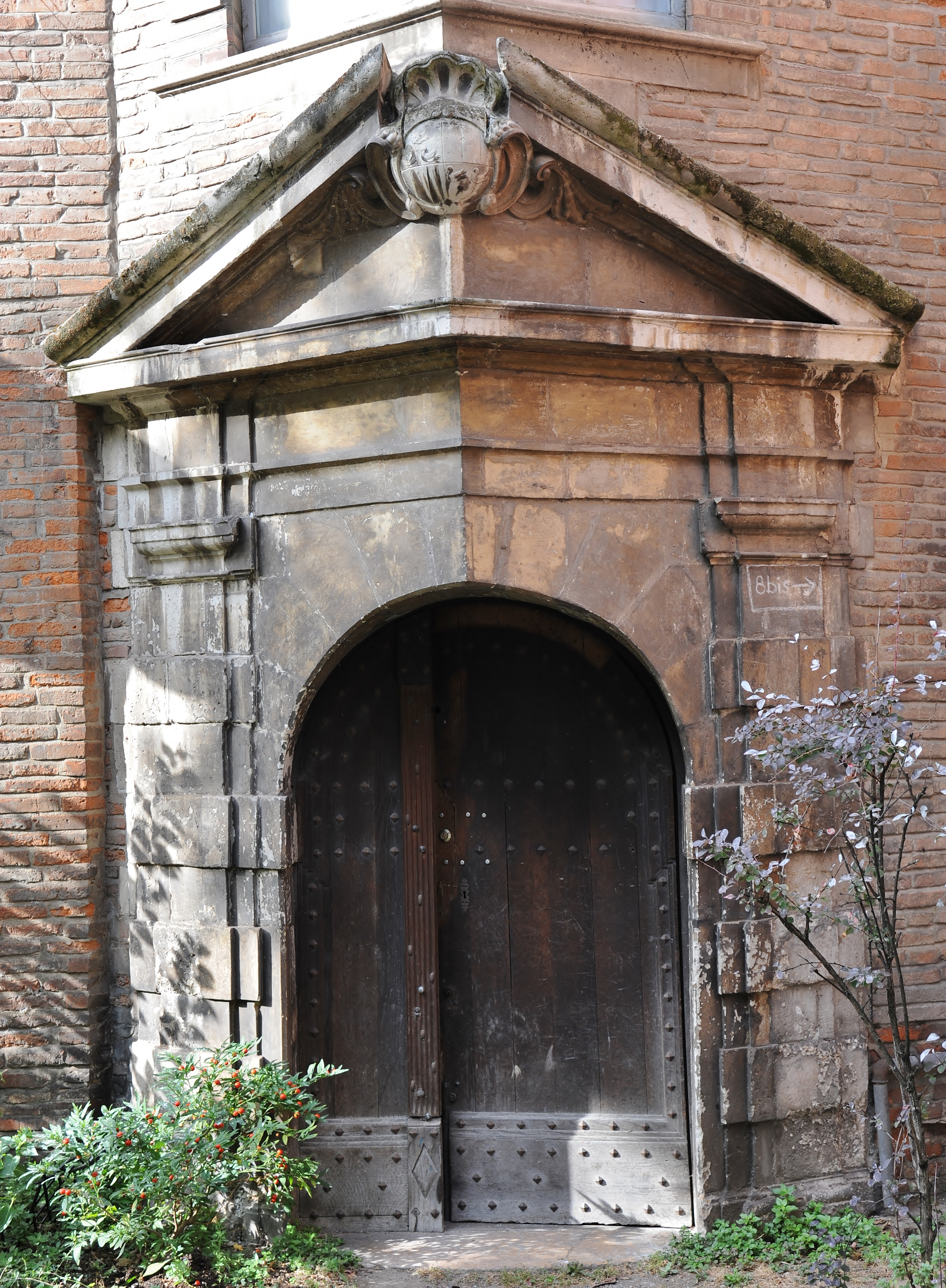
Corner door of the Baderon-Maussac tower (from 1606).

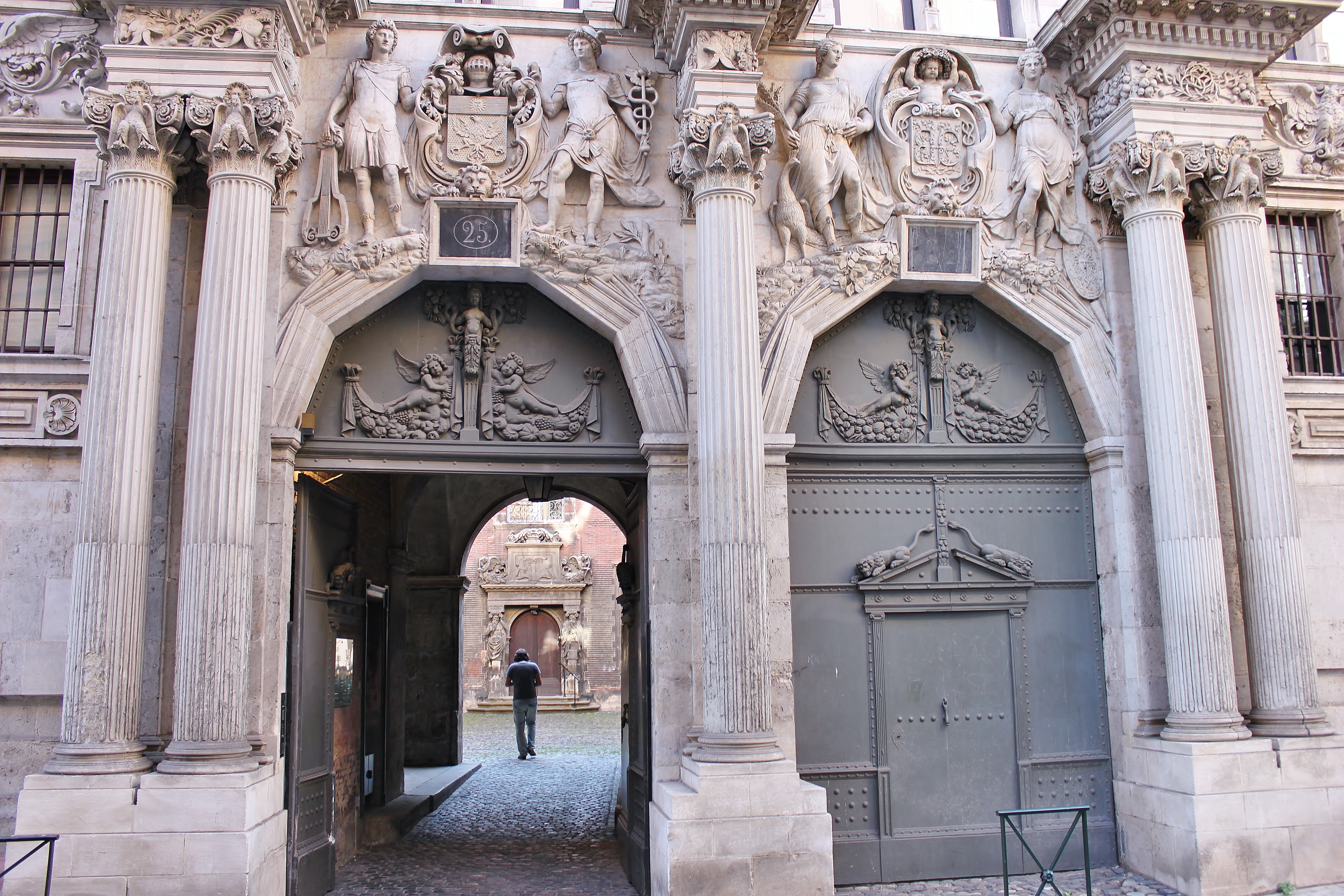
The portal of the Hôtel de Clary (1610-1616).

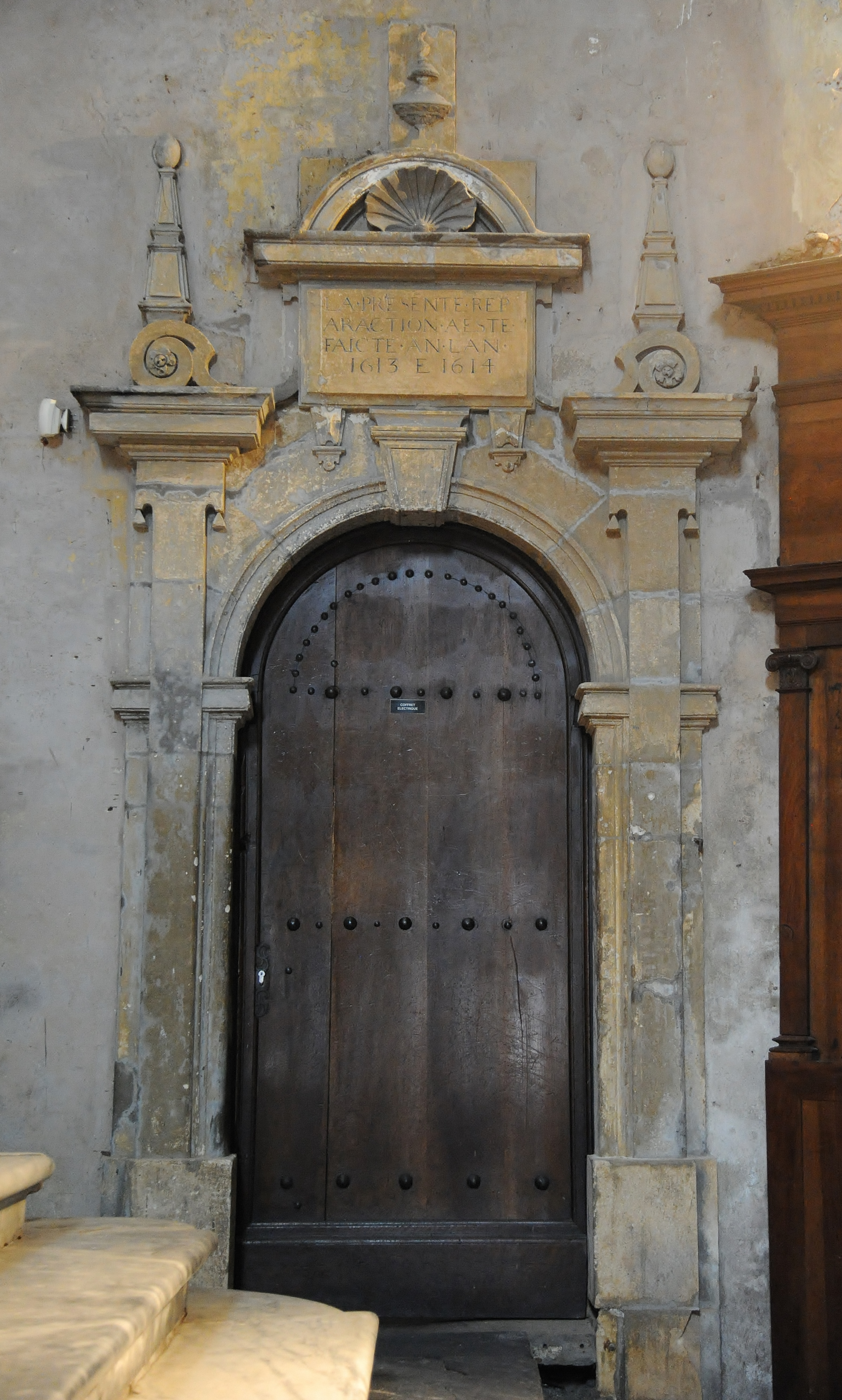
Door to Saint Stephen's Cathedral (1613-1614).

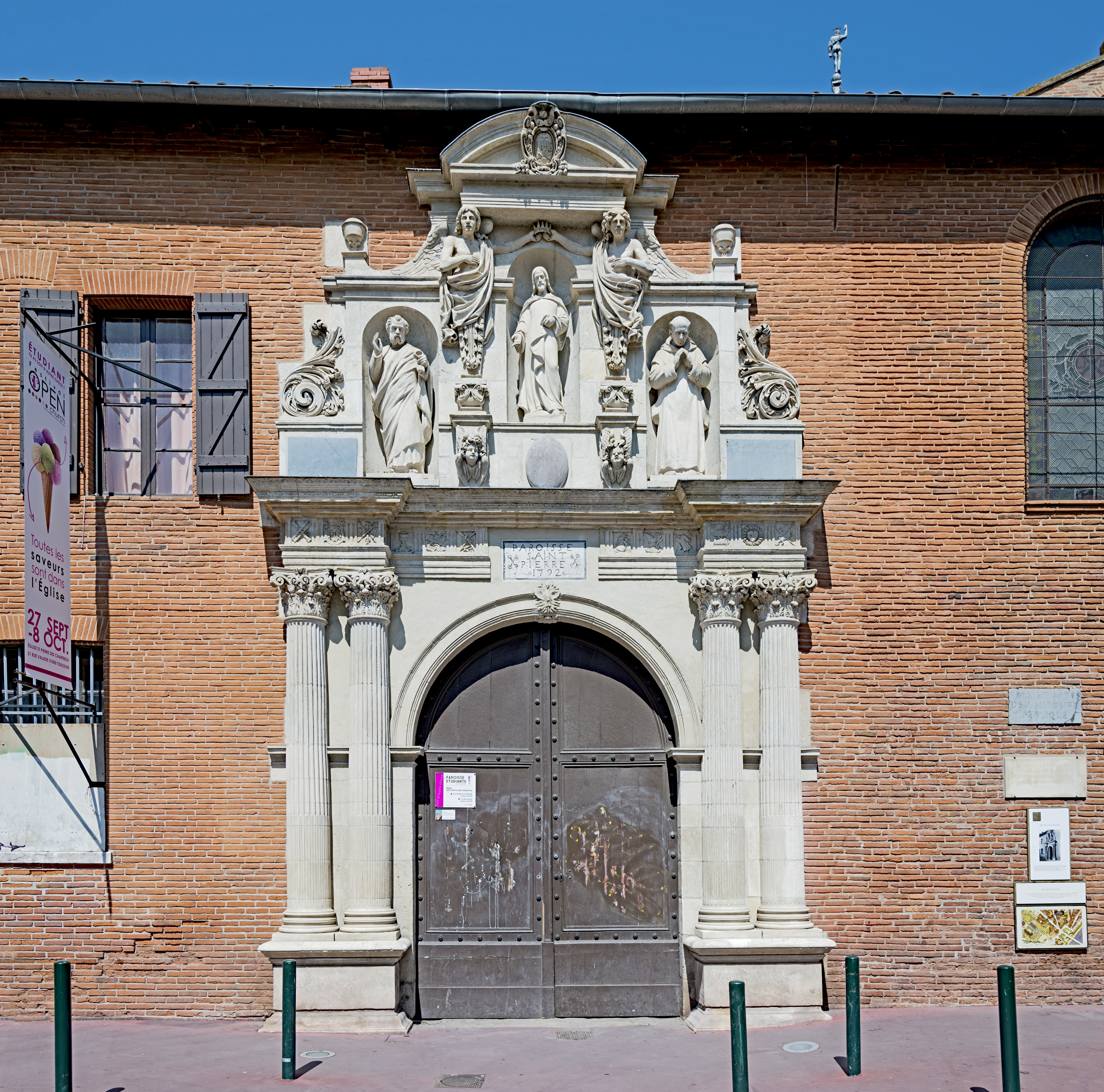
The portal of Saint-Pierre des Chartreux church was built in 1613 by Antoine Bachelier, one of the sons of the famous architect and sculptor Nicolas Bachelier.

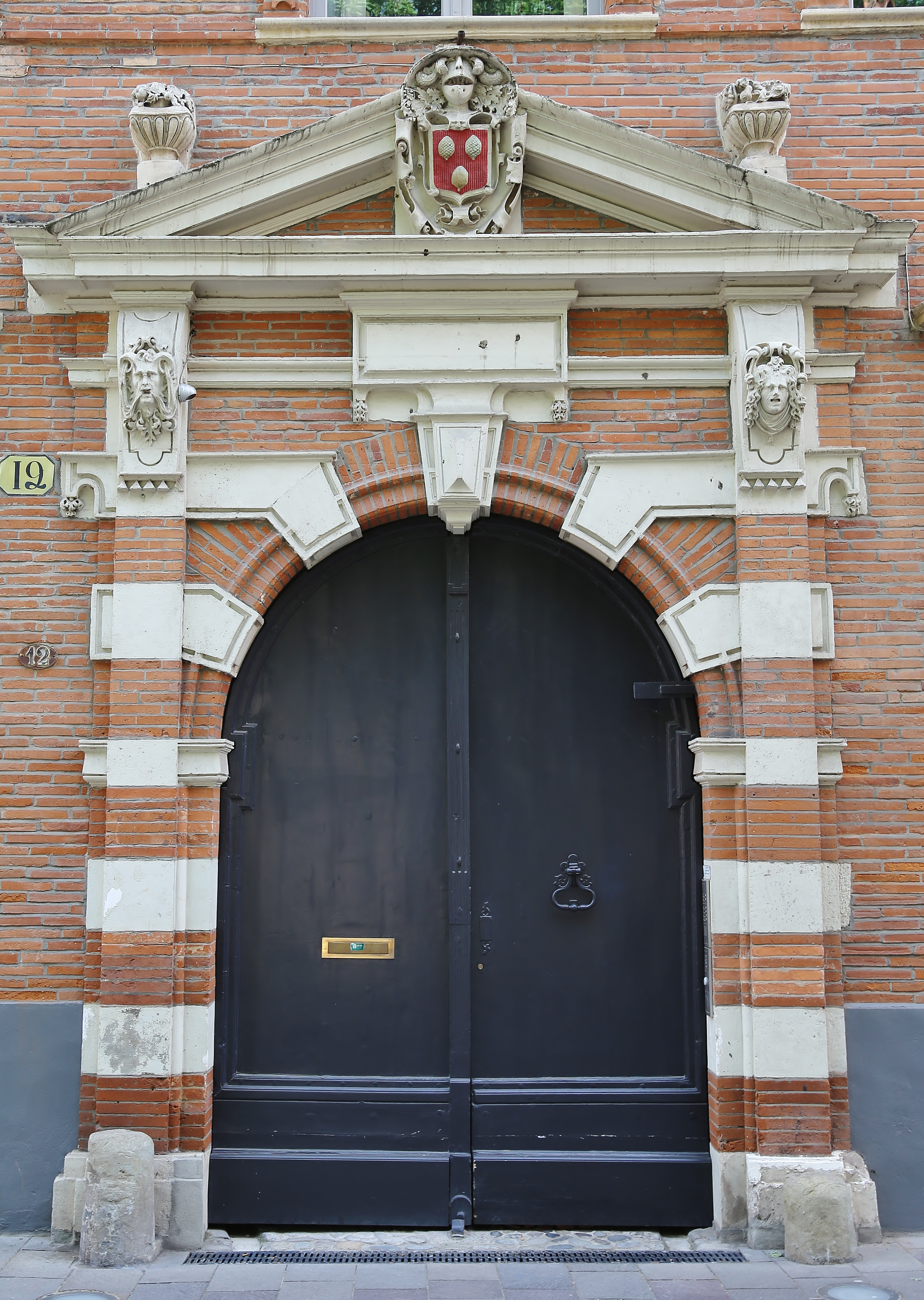
The portal of the Hôtel de Chalvet (1617), a transition between Renaissance references and the alternating brick and stone of 17th century Toulouse.

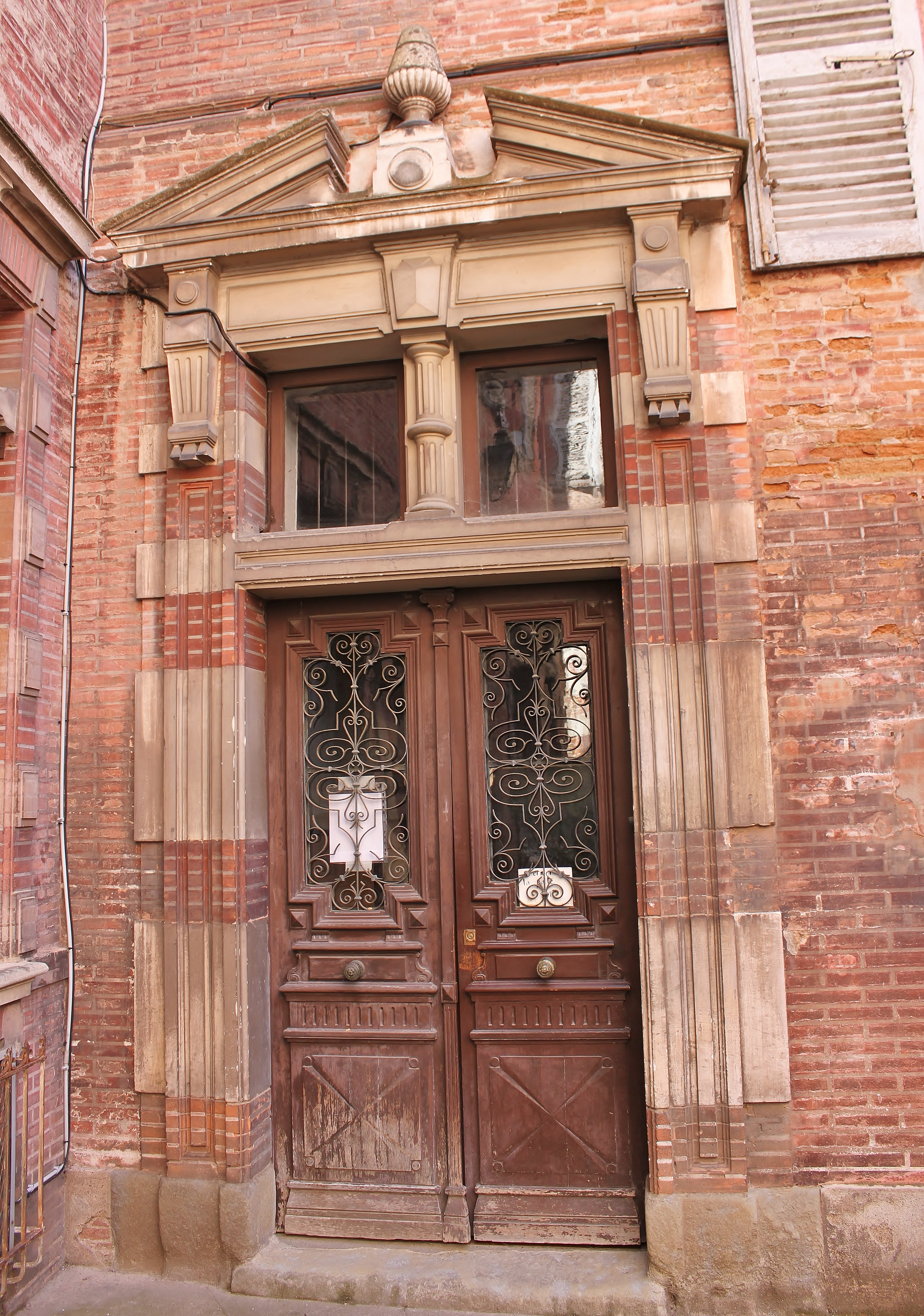
Door of the Hôtel de Jossé-Lauvreins, late 16th or early 17th century.

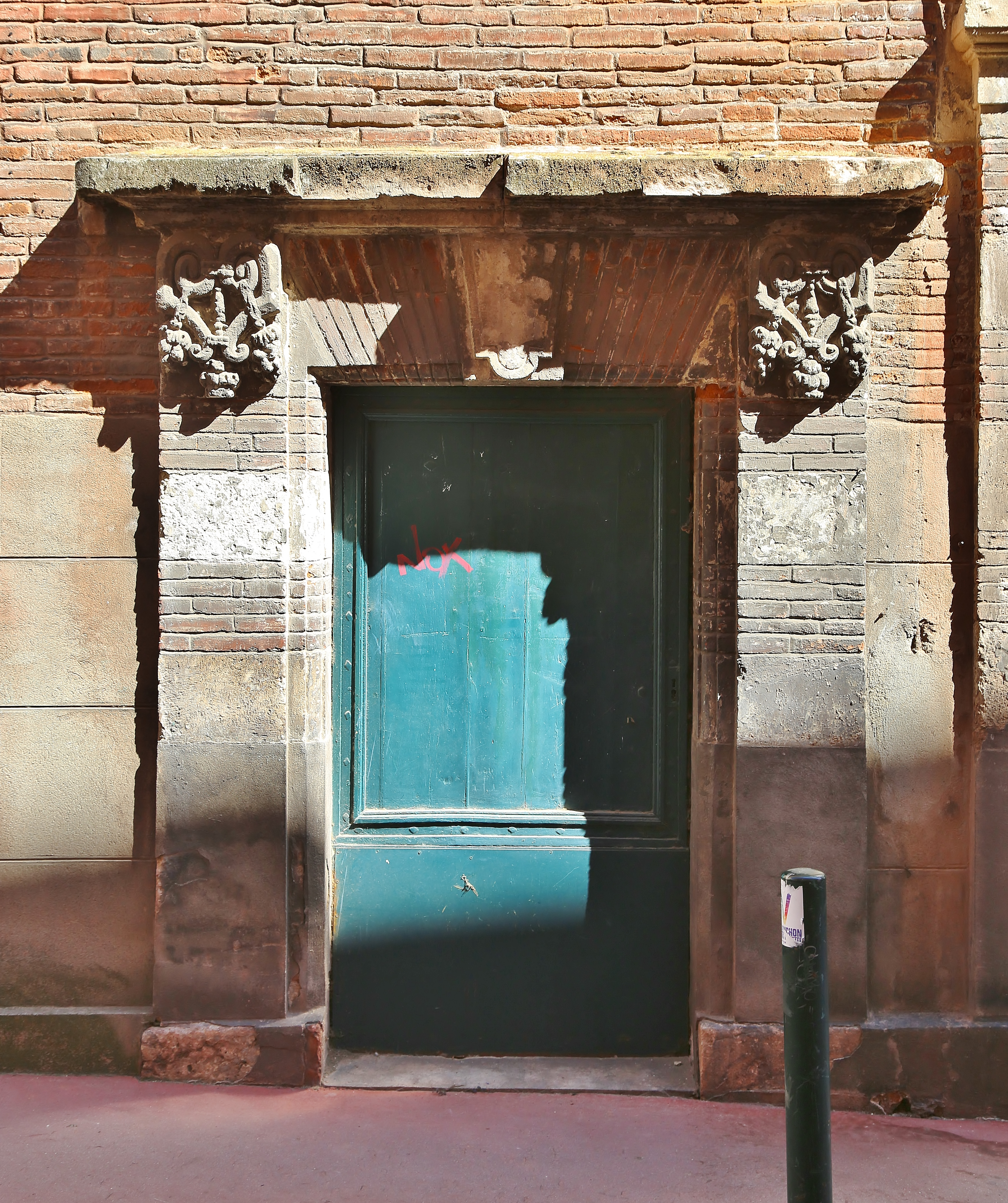
Little door of the Hôtel de Jossé-Lauvreins, late 16th or early 17th century.

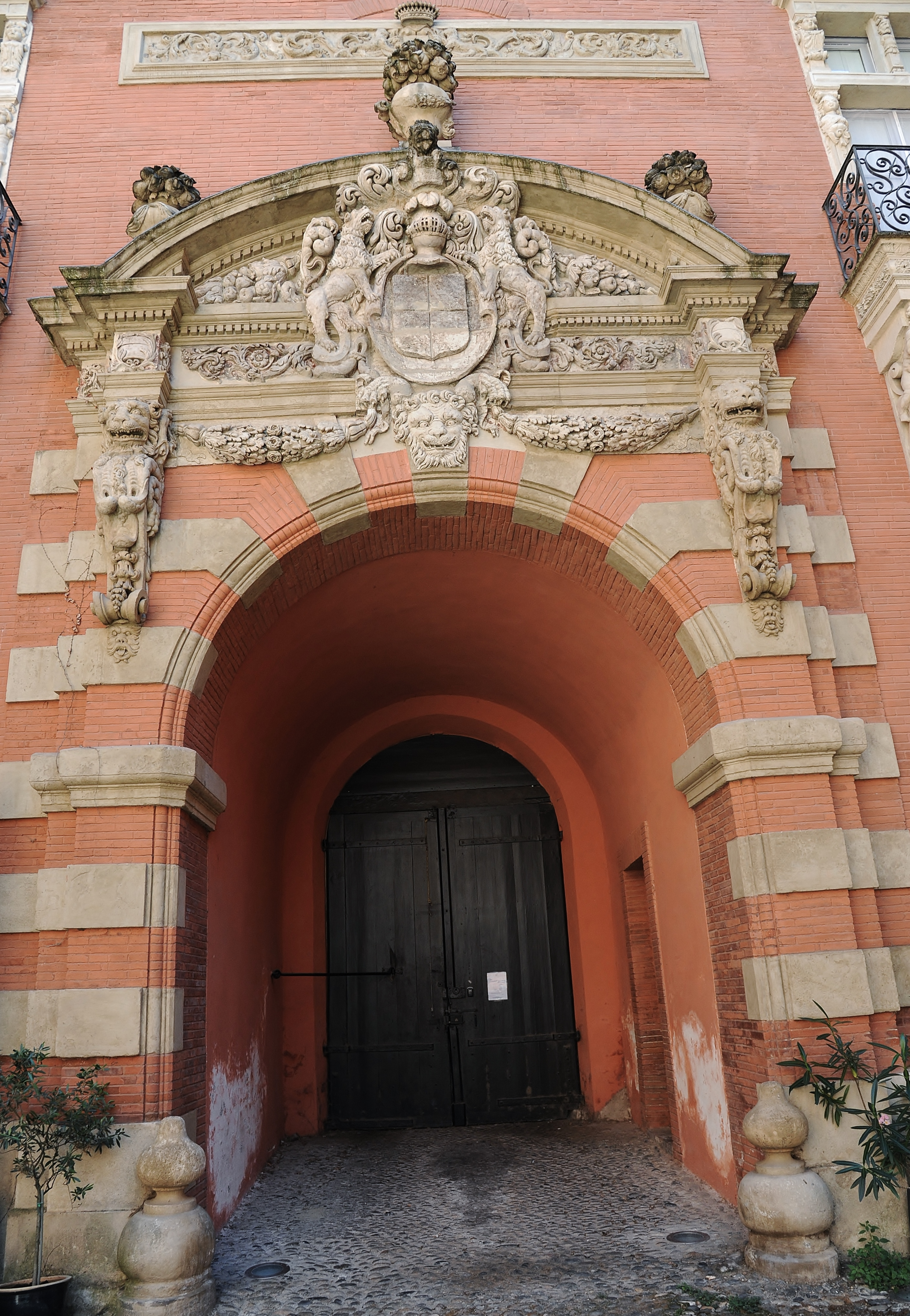
In a style of transition between the late Renaissance and the Baroque, this superb portal, now reassembled in a courtyard, was the monumental entrance to the hotel of Jean-Pierre Desplats, president at the Parlement between 1620 and 1622.

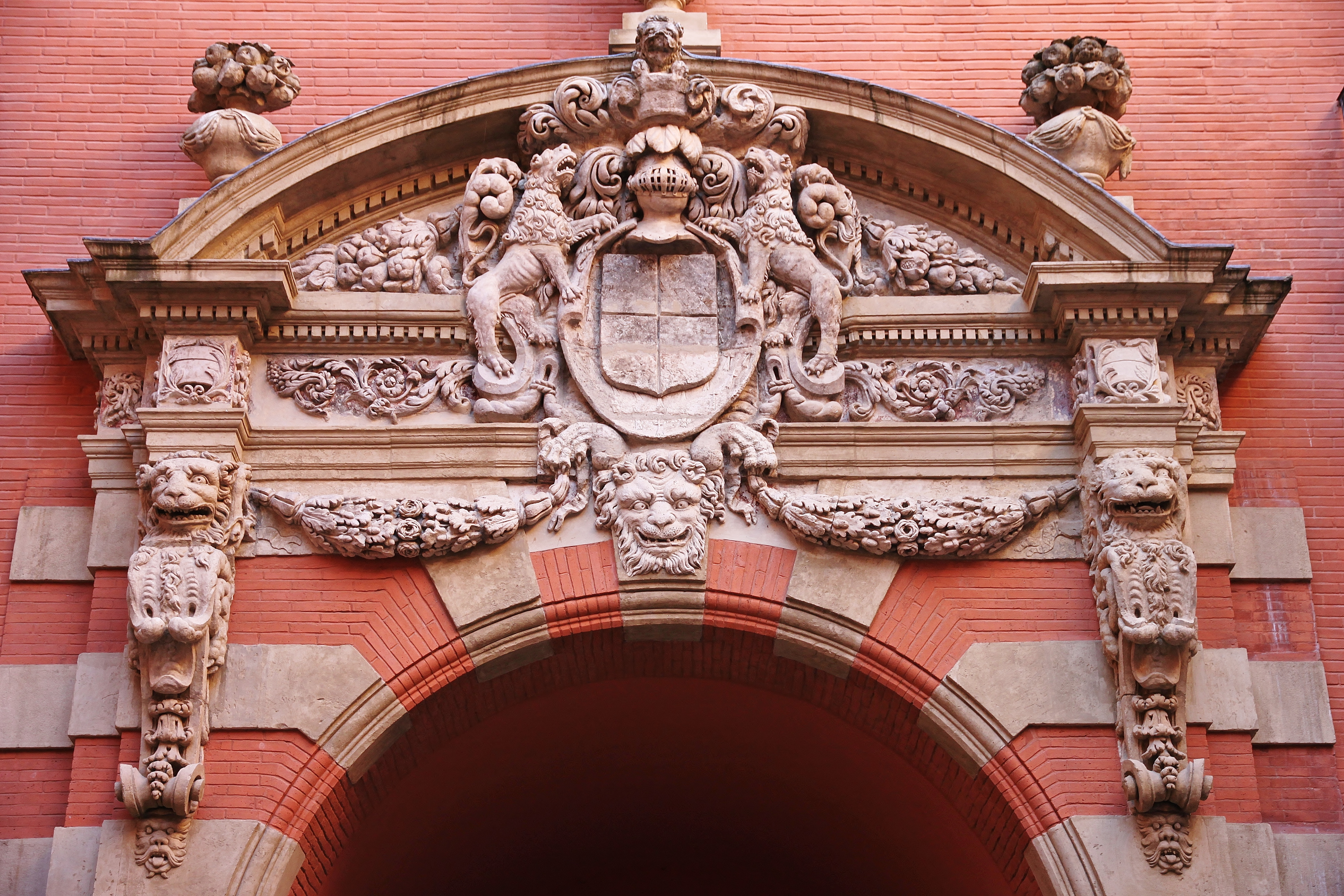
Détail of the previous photo (Hôtel Desplats).

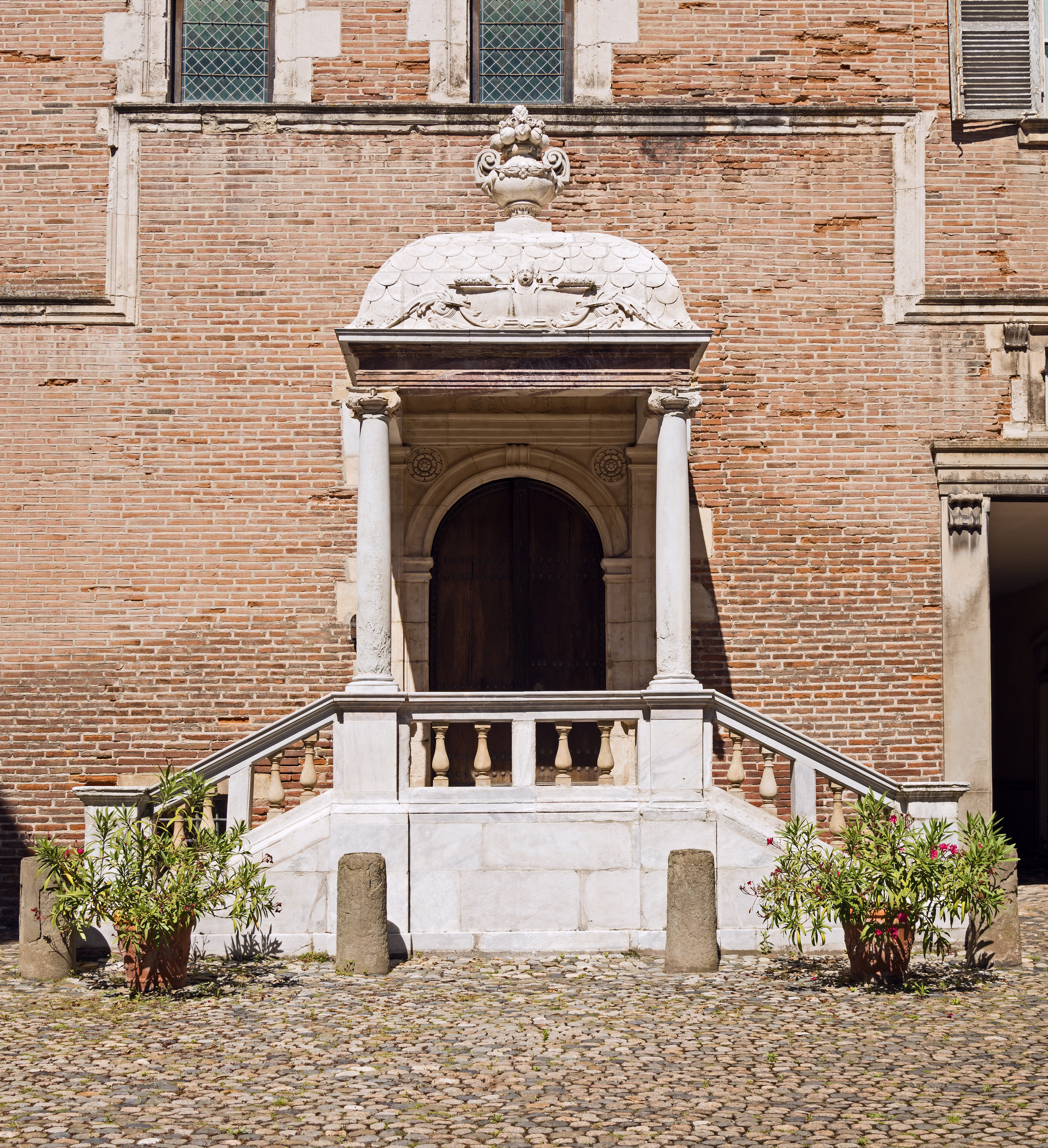
The stone and marble canopy of the Hotel d'Ulmo dates from the 17th century, however it could be a copy of a 16th-century canopy once located in the courtyard of the Toulouse Parlement.

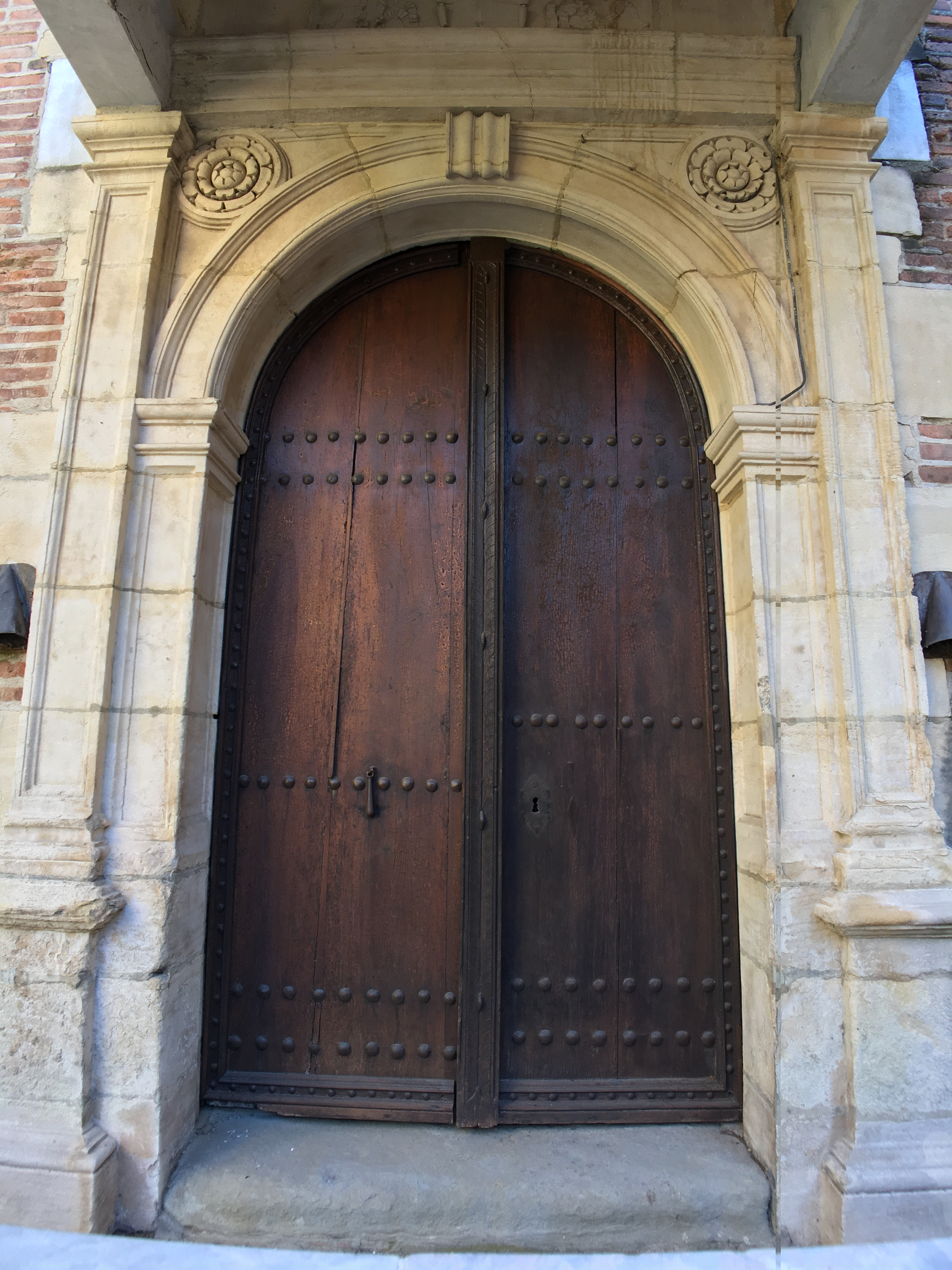
Door of the Hotel d'Ulmo under the canopy (17th century or between 1526 and 1536).

=== The ornate windows ===
Together with the gate, the most obvious sign of an owner's social status was the carved window. The use of stone on a brick background highlights these openings, which, as in Italy, constitute isolated motifs. The break with the flamboyant Gothic style was expressed by the term "à l'antique" (meaning in the antique-like style) used in the construction contracts, but this formulation actually covered a wide range of solutions that were constantly evolving.

The ornamental vocabulary of the first Renaissance (scrolls, medallions, putti) was replaced in 1538 by the "fenestre à l'antique" (antique window) installed by the architect and stonemason Nicolas Bachelier at the Hôtel de Bagis. On this occasion, Bachelier proceeded to a progressive representation of the Doric order, increasingly complete throughout the levels, making each window a miniature temple in the ancient style. Modernizing the window with superimposed columns from Italy, he took over the position of the quarter candelabra in the windows of the Hôtel du Vieux-Raisin by inserting a quarter Doric column in the spandrel. Rather than superimpose two small columns, Bachelier preferred to use the height of the bay to present a complete Doric order by placing a triglyph of elongated proportions on the small column, thus giving the opening, topped by an imposing cornice, a greater monumentality.

This formula of the "antique window" developed by Bachelier at the Hôtel de Bagis was taken up by himself in 1540–1544 at the Hôtel de Guillaume de Bernuy. The use of tables furnished with Mannerist decorations inspired by the School of Fontainebleau adds sophistication to the framing.

This model was once again taken up on the windows that in 1546 Jean Cheverry had built on the new buildings of the 15th century Hôtel de Boysson, with Doric or Ionic columns. Cheverry also modernised the appearance of the medieval staircase tower by inserting a window on the first floor decorated with terms, half man, half column, taken from ancient architecture. Above these, pilasters feature an engraving by Serlio inspired by a pulpit in the Roman Archbasilica of Saint John Lateran.

This desire to imitate the windows of a great parlementarian can be seen as a strategy for appropriating the taste of the city's most important figures (Jean de Bagis was also a member of the King's Great Council), appreciated by the merchants in full social ascent and in search of recognition.

Responding to a logic of honorary re-appropriation, this type of imitation was practised throughout the century. The merchant Jean Astorg proceeded in this way when, around 1562, in order to decorate the windows of his new building at the back of the courtyard, he had the windows of his neighbour, Pierre Delpech (1554–1560), an influential member of the Catholic League particularly involved in the fight against the Protestants, imitated. These windows have a frame known in French as a "chambranle à crossettes", supported by four short pilaster. These do not play a supporting role, but rather appear suspended and dependent on the frame they are supposed to support.

Some of the windows of the Hôtel de Massas (or Hôtel d'Aldéguier) were designed based on the engraved models of the Extraordinary Book by the royal architect Sebastiano Serlio. An edition of this book, kept in Paris, contains a sheet of drawings by the architect of the Hôtel de Massas. They detail the designer's reflections on the profiles of the courtyard windows and their decoration based on the models engraved by Serlio. They are most certainly the work of Nicolas Bachelier's son, Dominique, who was one of the great builders of the second half of the 16th century. This sheet of sketches tells us about the taste and preferences of an architect for the extraordinary shapes he creates, mixes and combines to his liking. It is the oldest surviving record of the graphic invention of a French architect-artist.

The windows of the house of Élie Géraud, master goldsmith, are more modest as they are made of wood and placed on a half-timbered house. They reflect the desire to imitate the stone framed windows of hôtels particuliers.

The astonishing stylistic diversity of Toulouse's Renaissance windows reveals both the influence of numerous prestigious formal sources and the abundant creativity of the architects in adapting them.

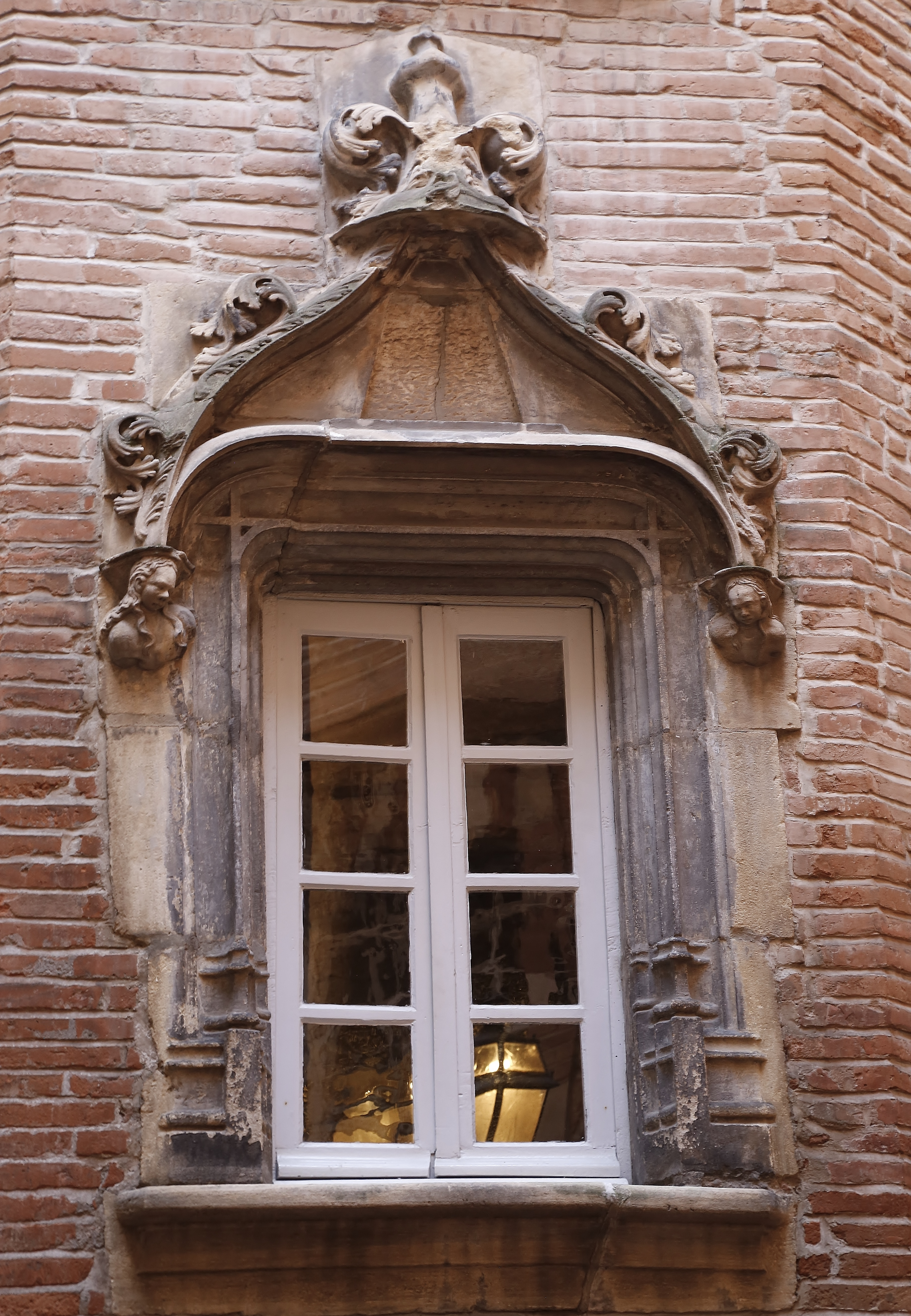
Hôtel Bérenguier Bonnefoy (tower), Gothic window (1513) with modillions representing busts in Renaissance style.

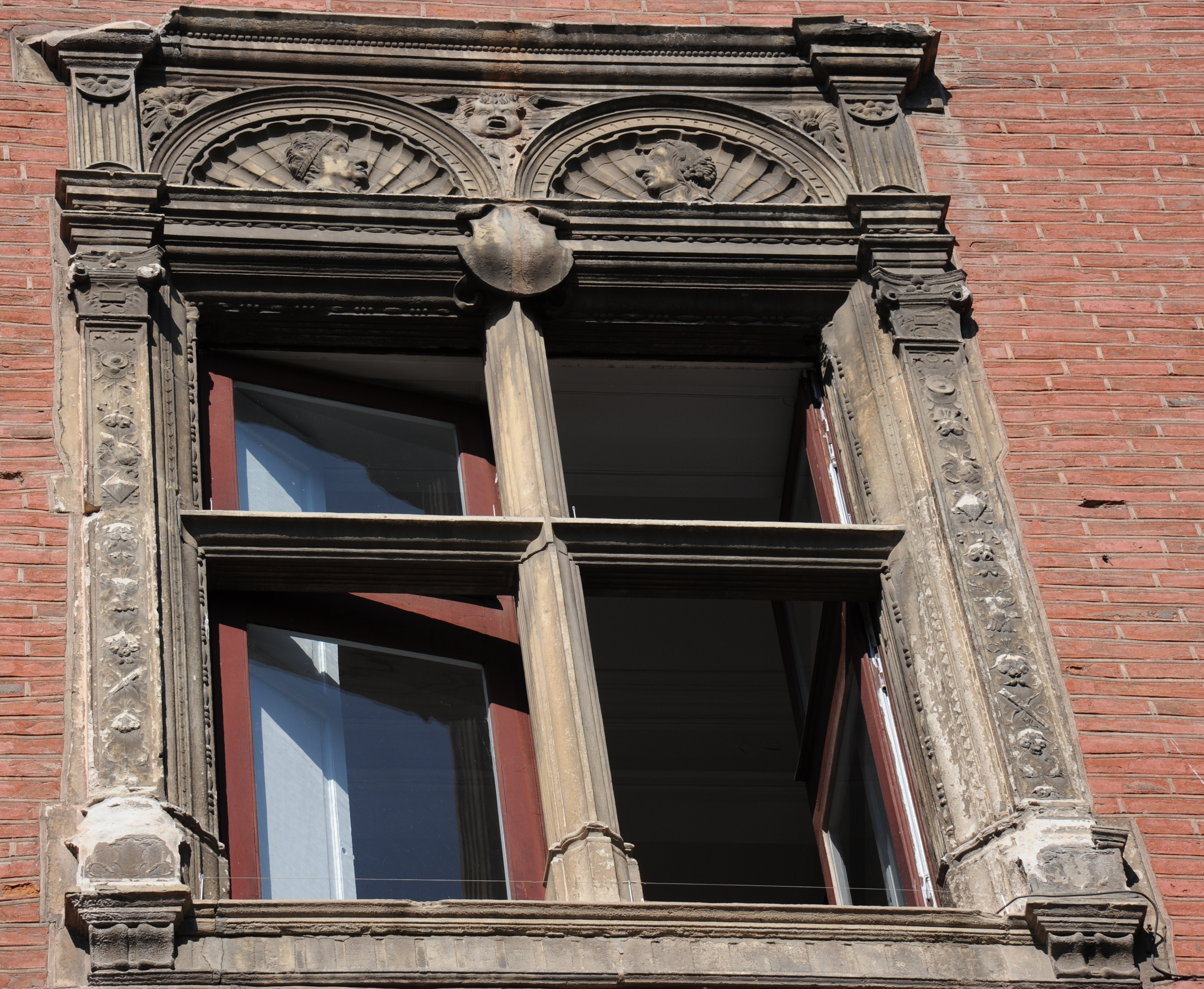
Hôtel du Vieux-Raisin (rear façade).

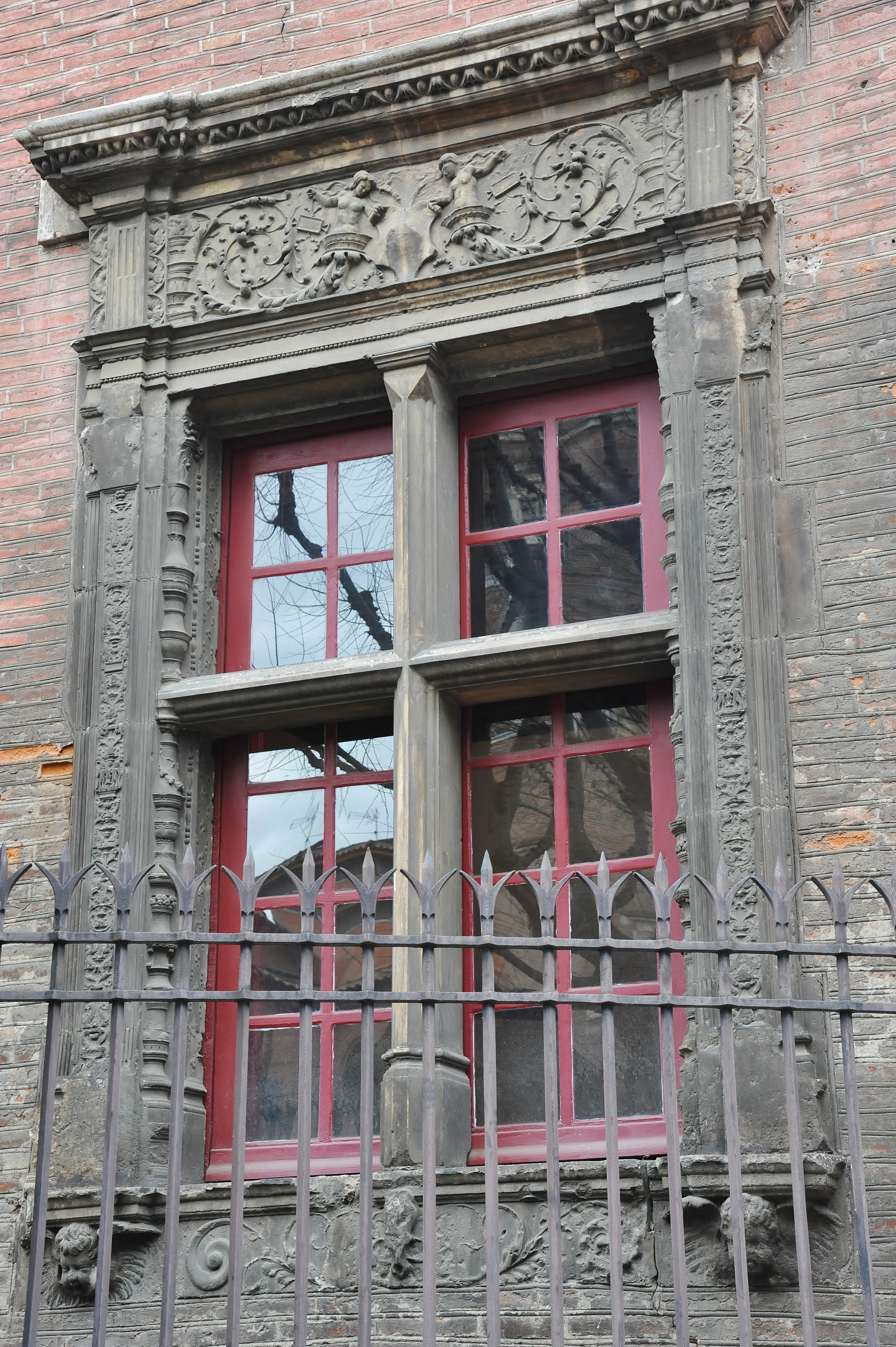
Hôtel du Vieux-Raisin (rear façade).

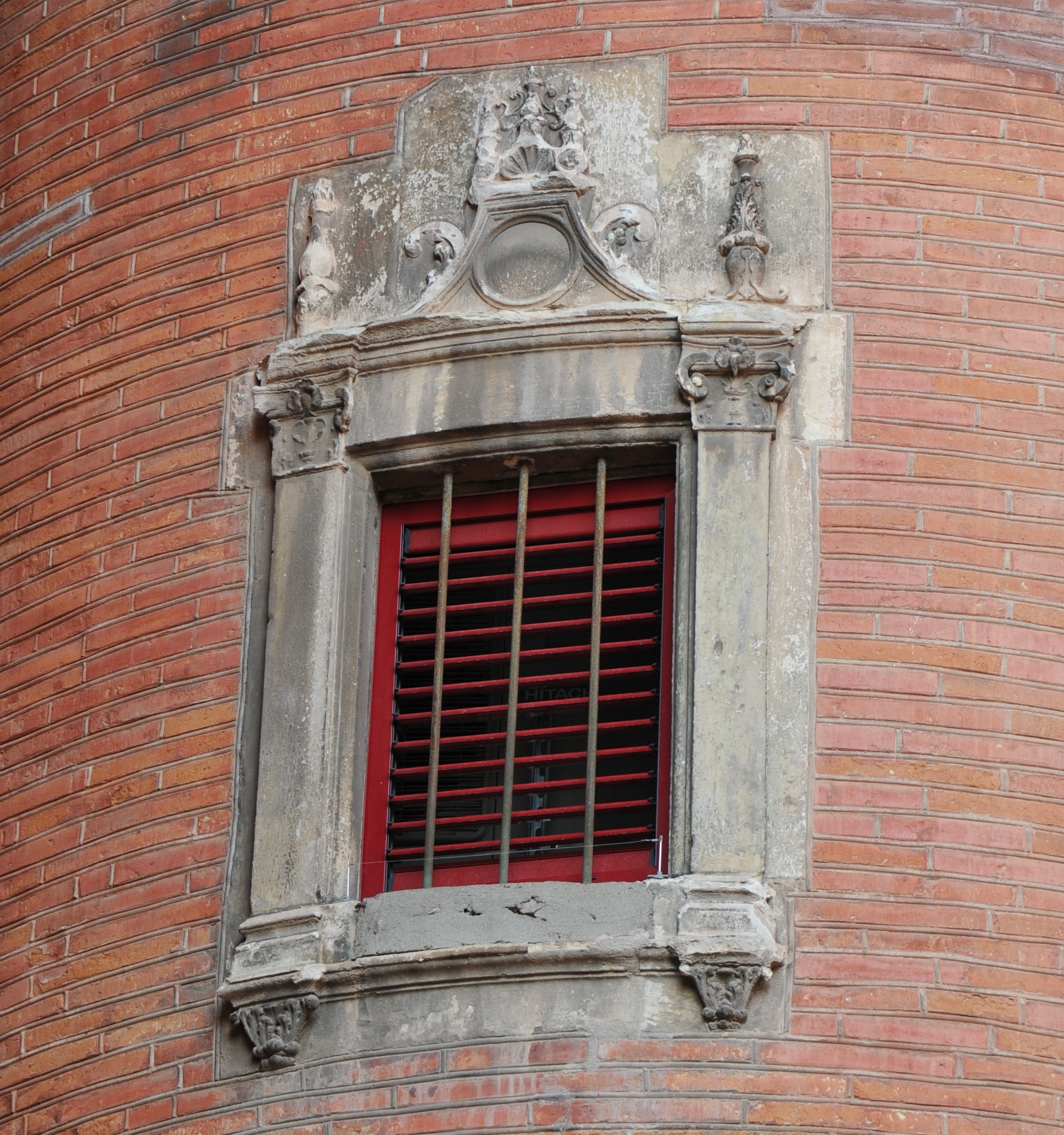
Hôtel du Vieux-Raisin (rear façade).

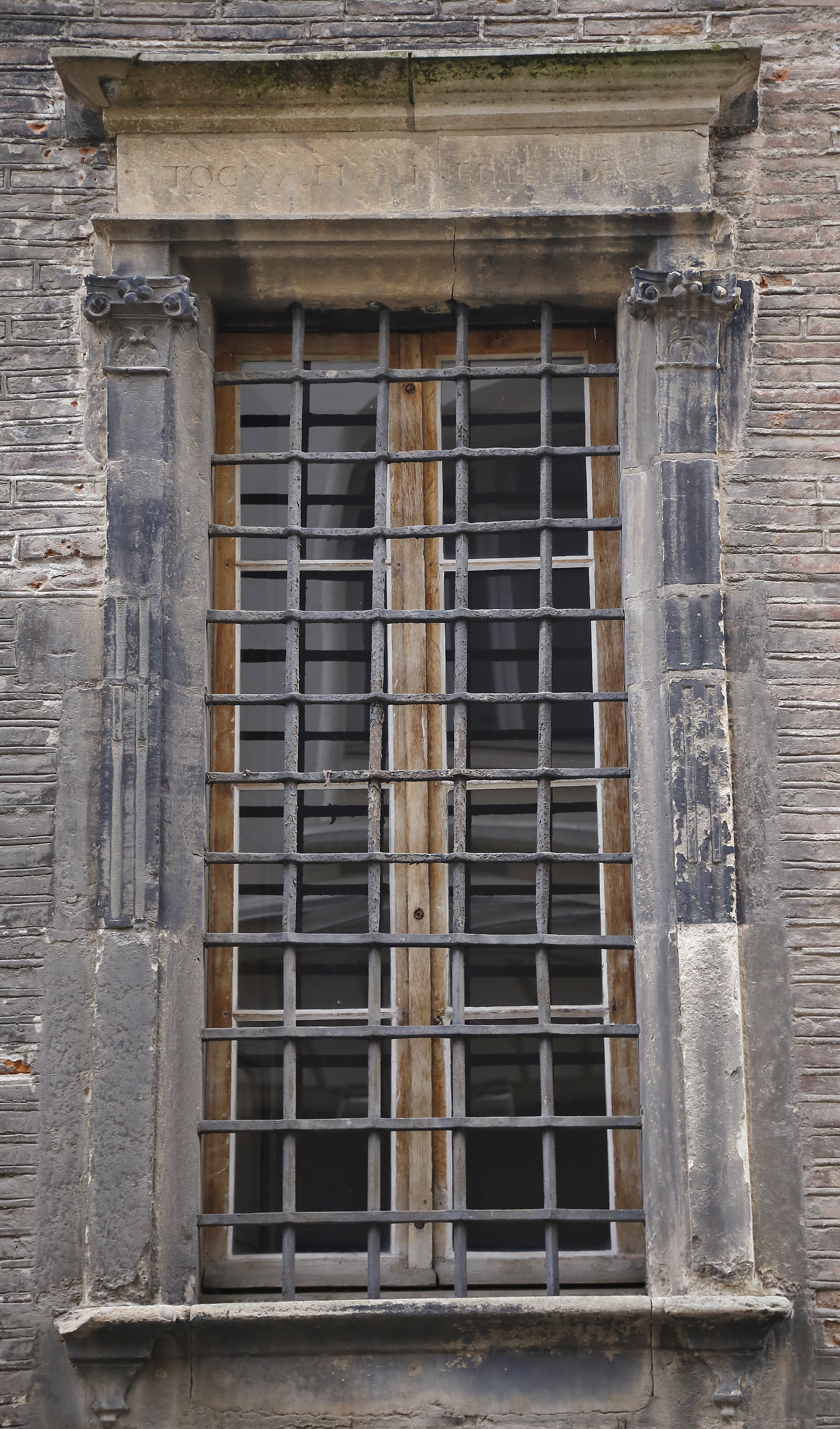
Hôtel du Vieux-Raisin (on Félix street).

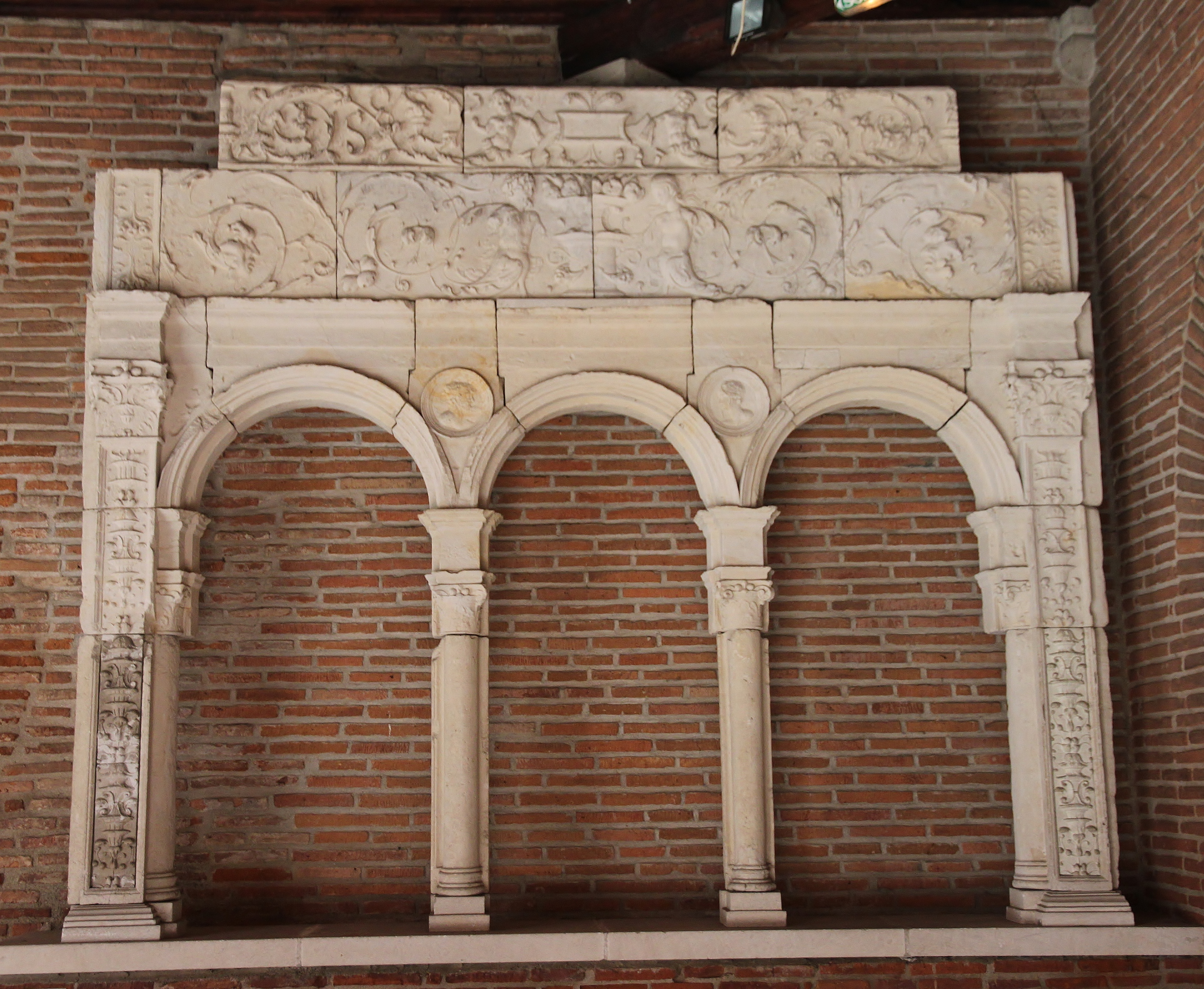
Hôtel du Vieux-Raisin (destroyed façade).

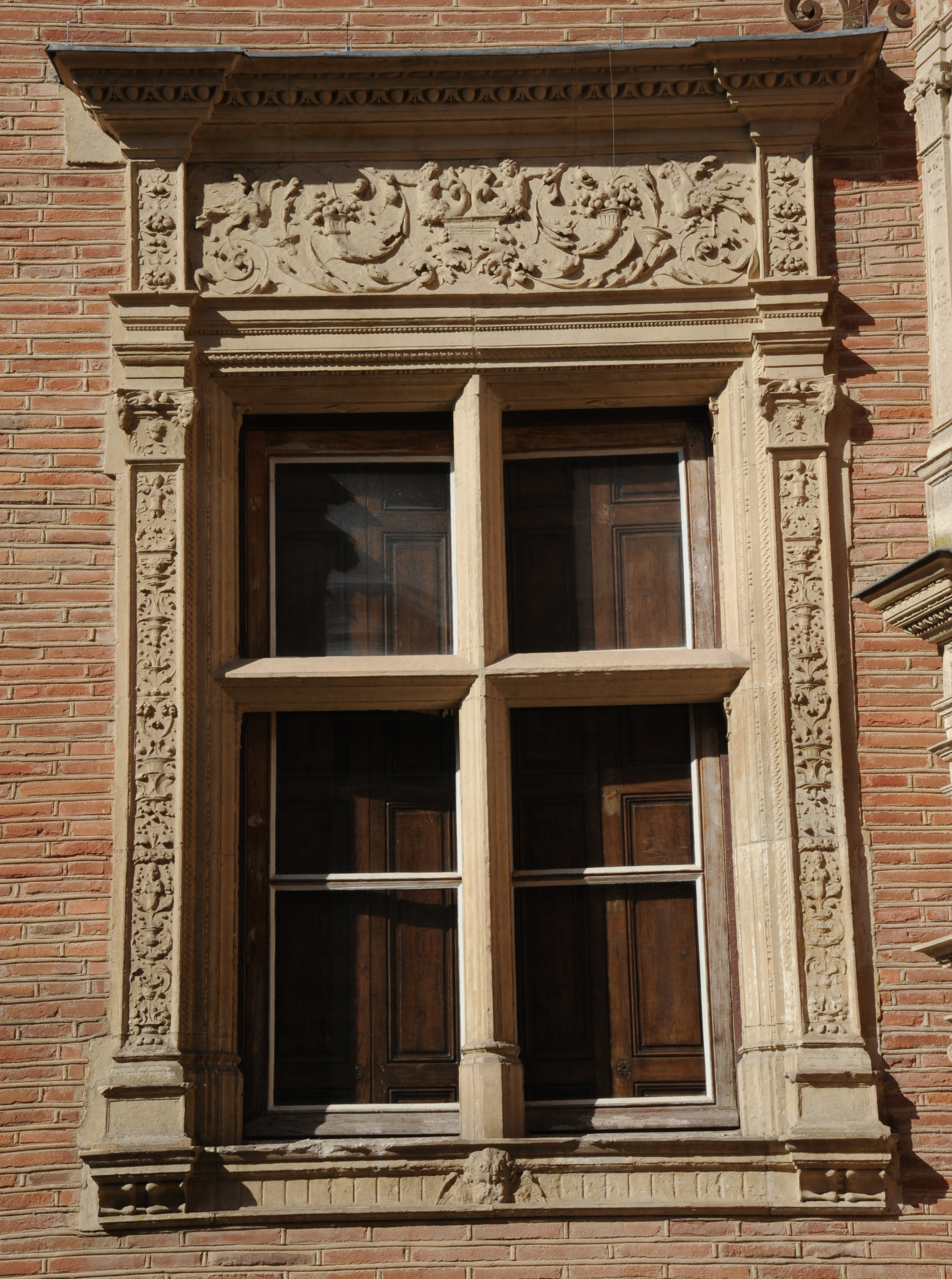
Hôtel du Vieux-Raisin.

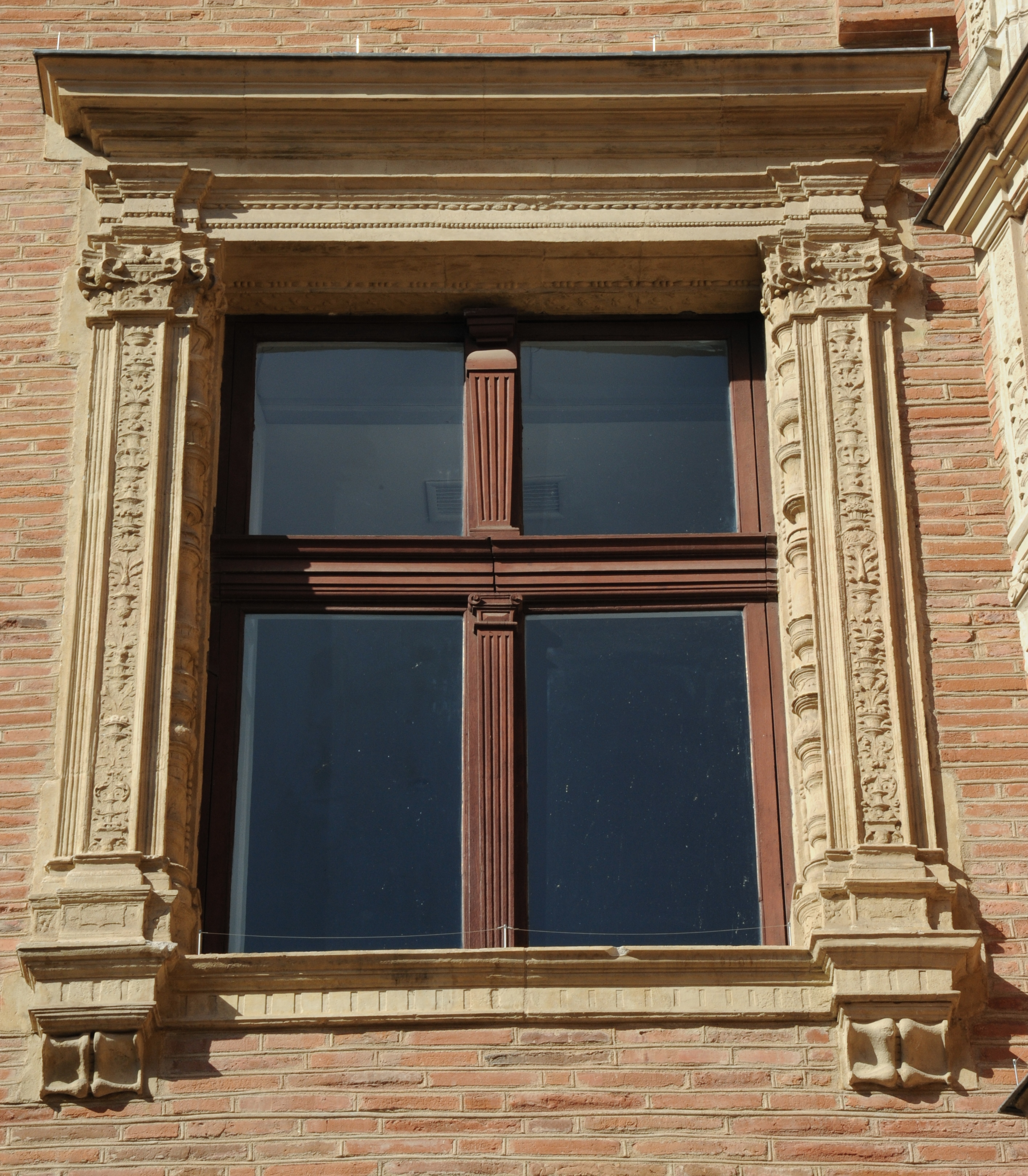
Hôtel du Vieux-Raisin.

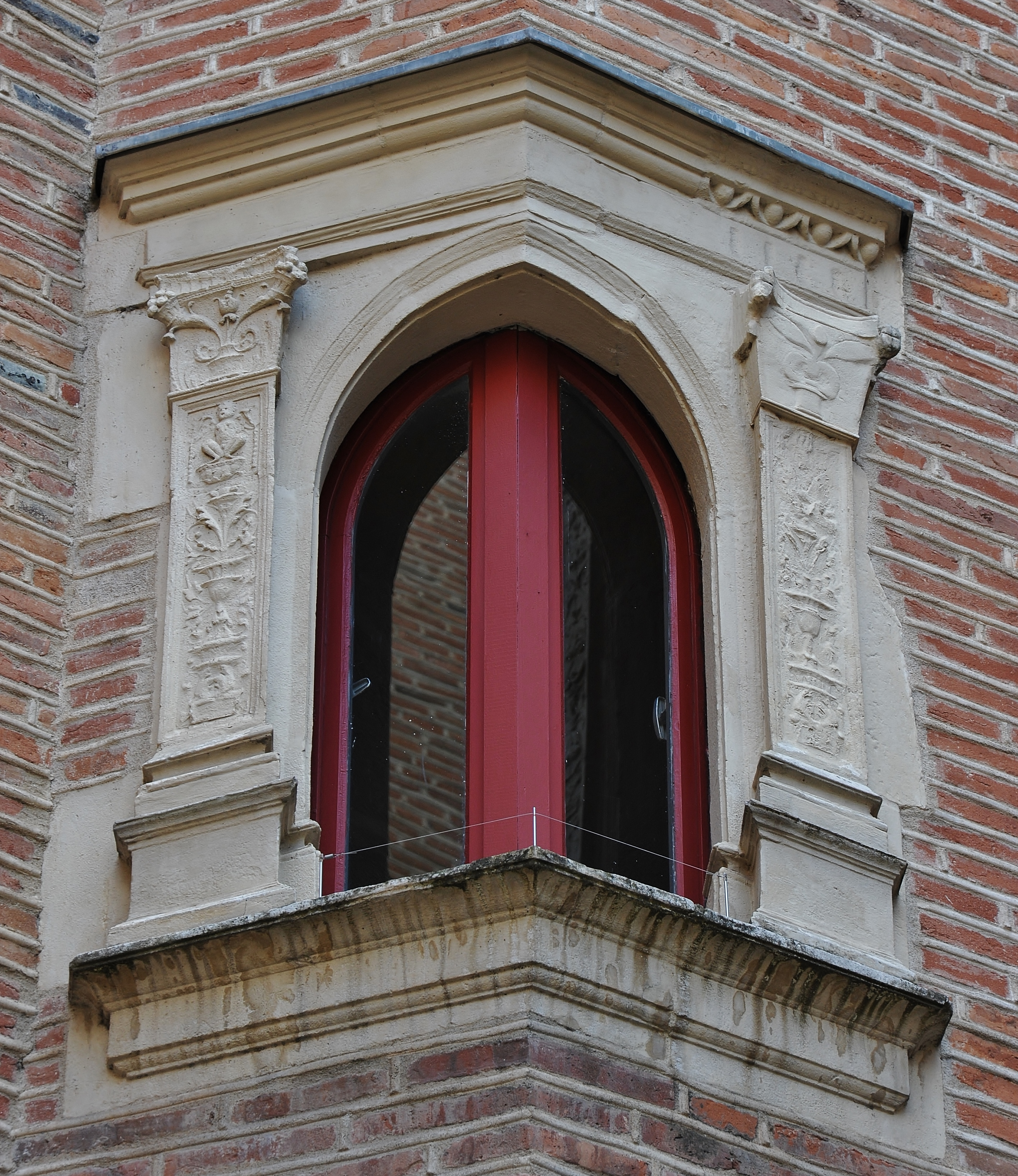
Hôtel du Vieux-Raisin.

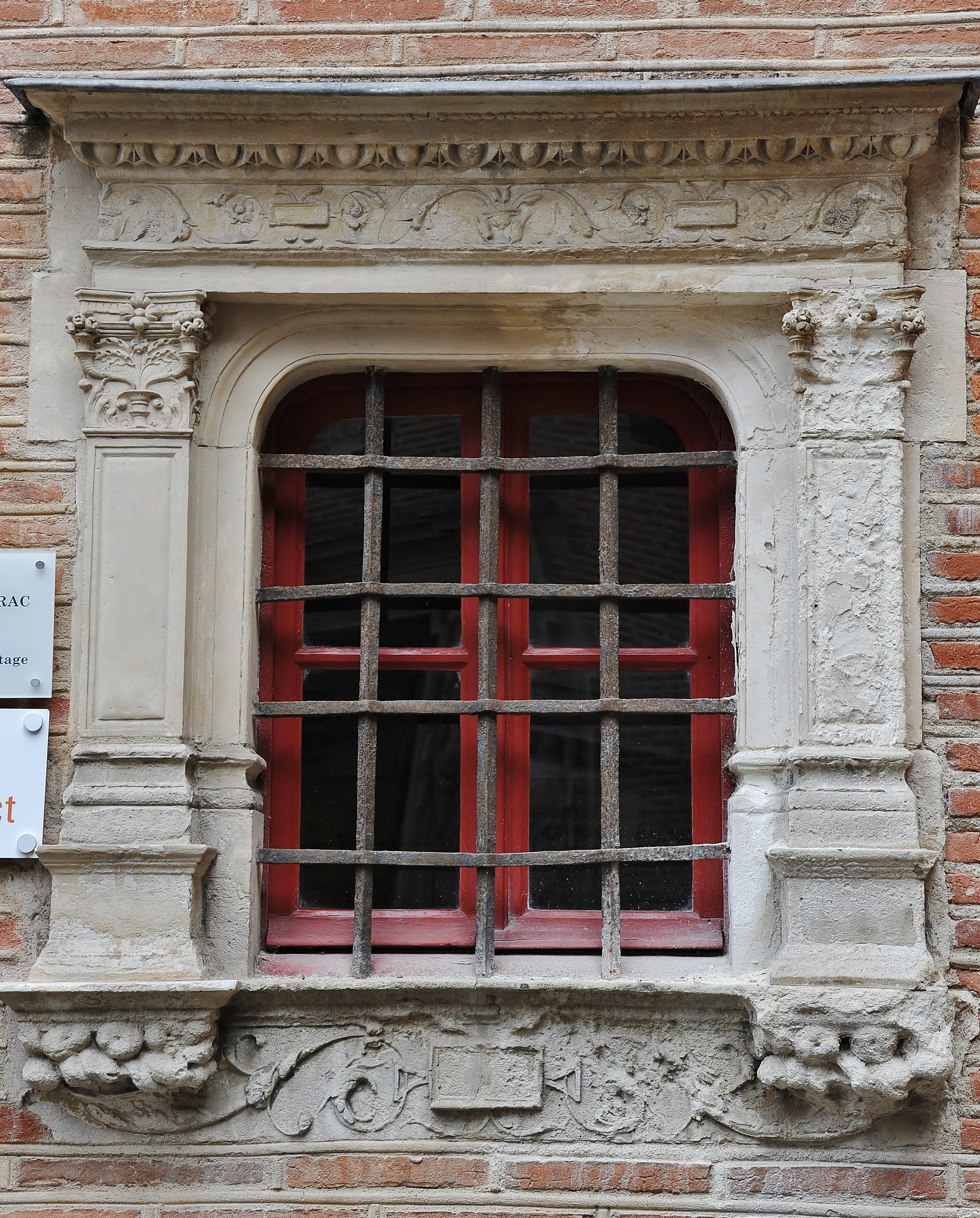
Hôtel du Vieux-Raisin.

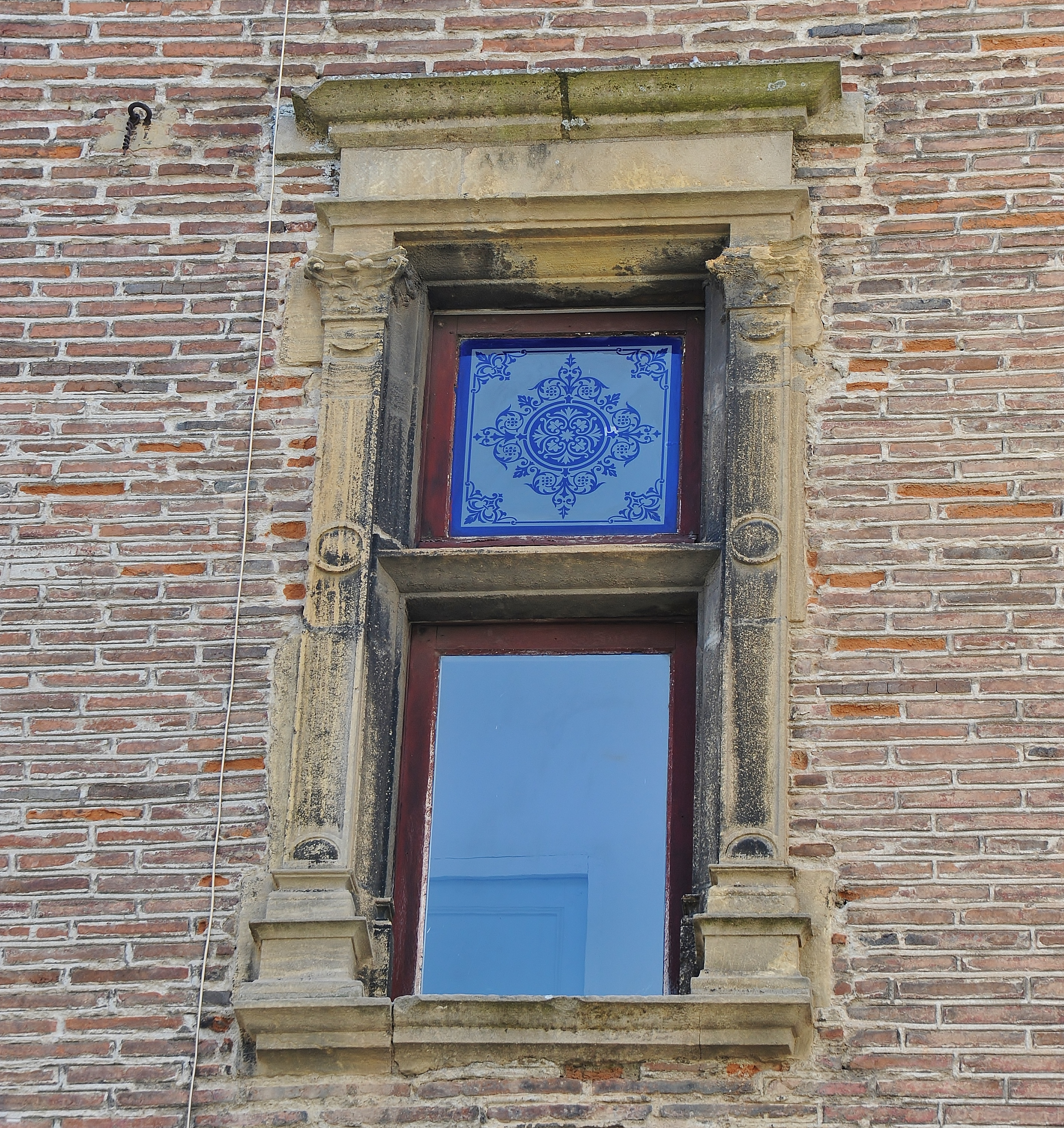
Hôtel du Vieux-Raisin.

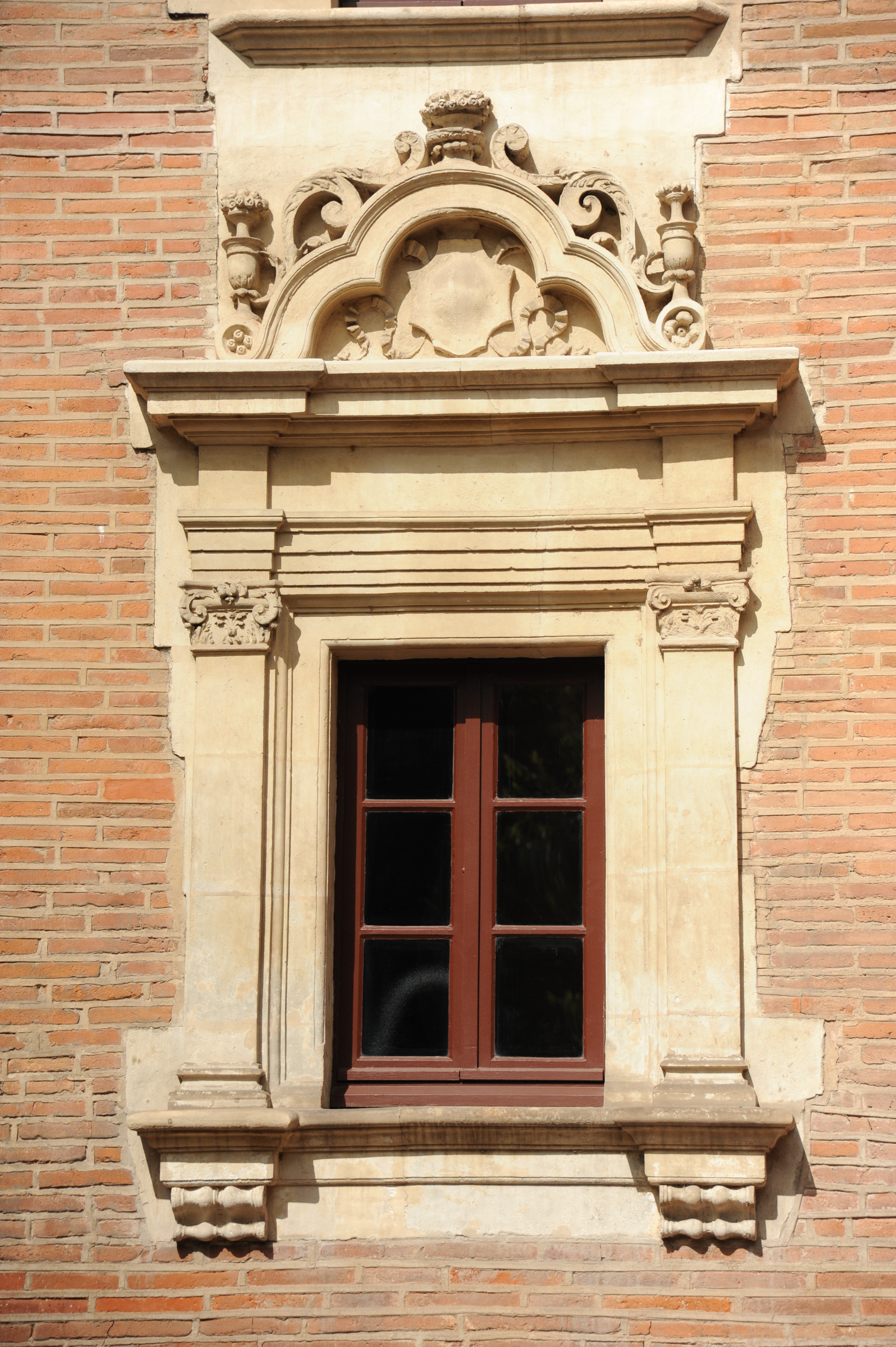
Hôtel de Tournoer.

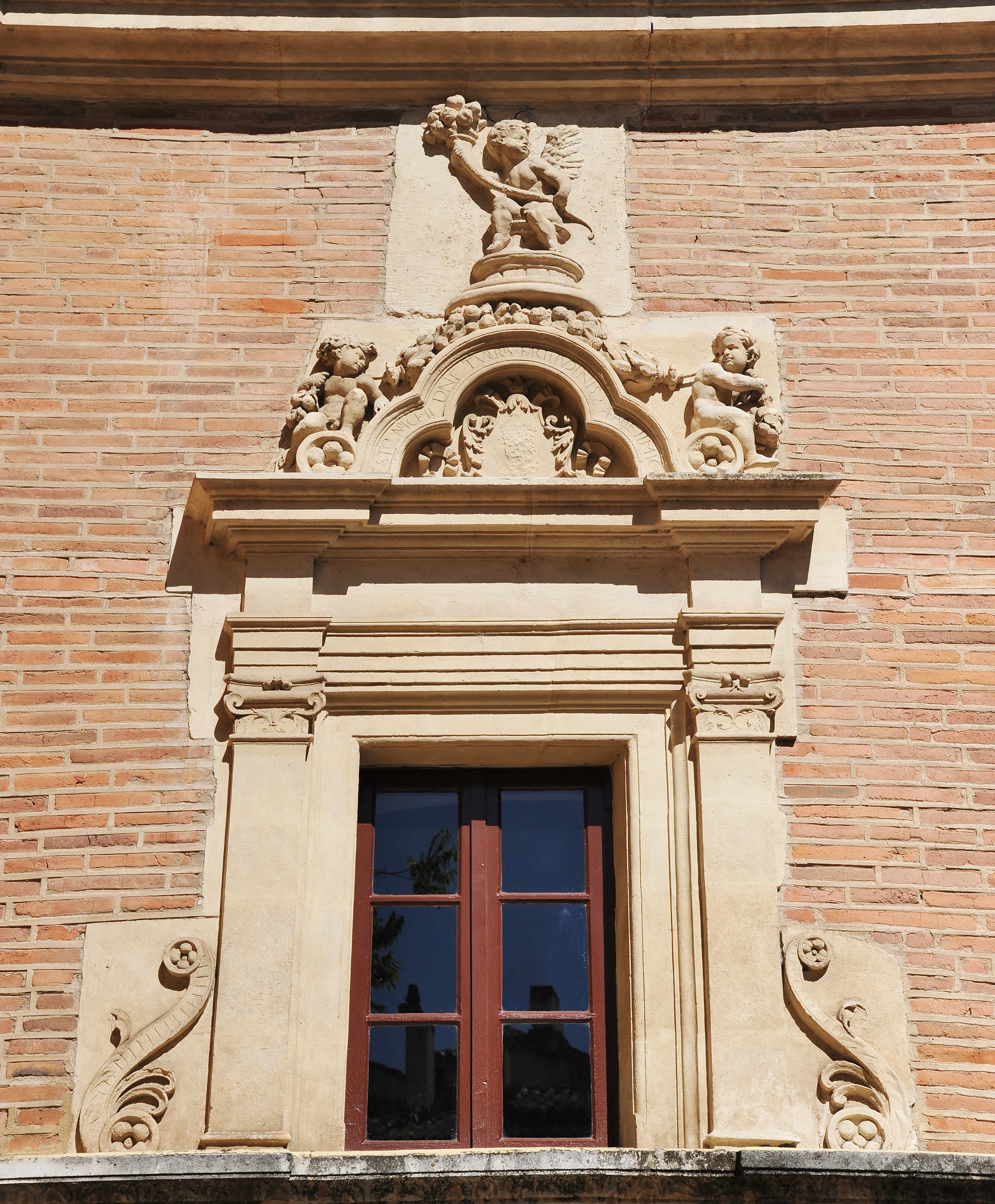
Hôtel de Tournoer.

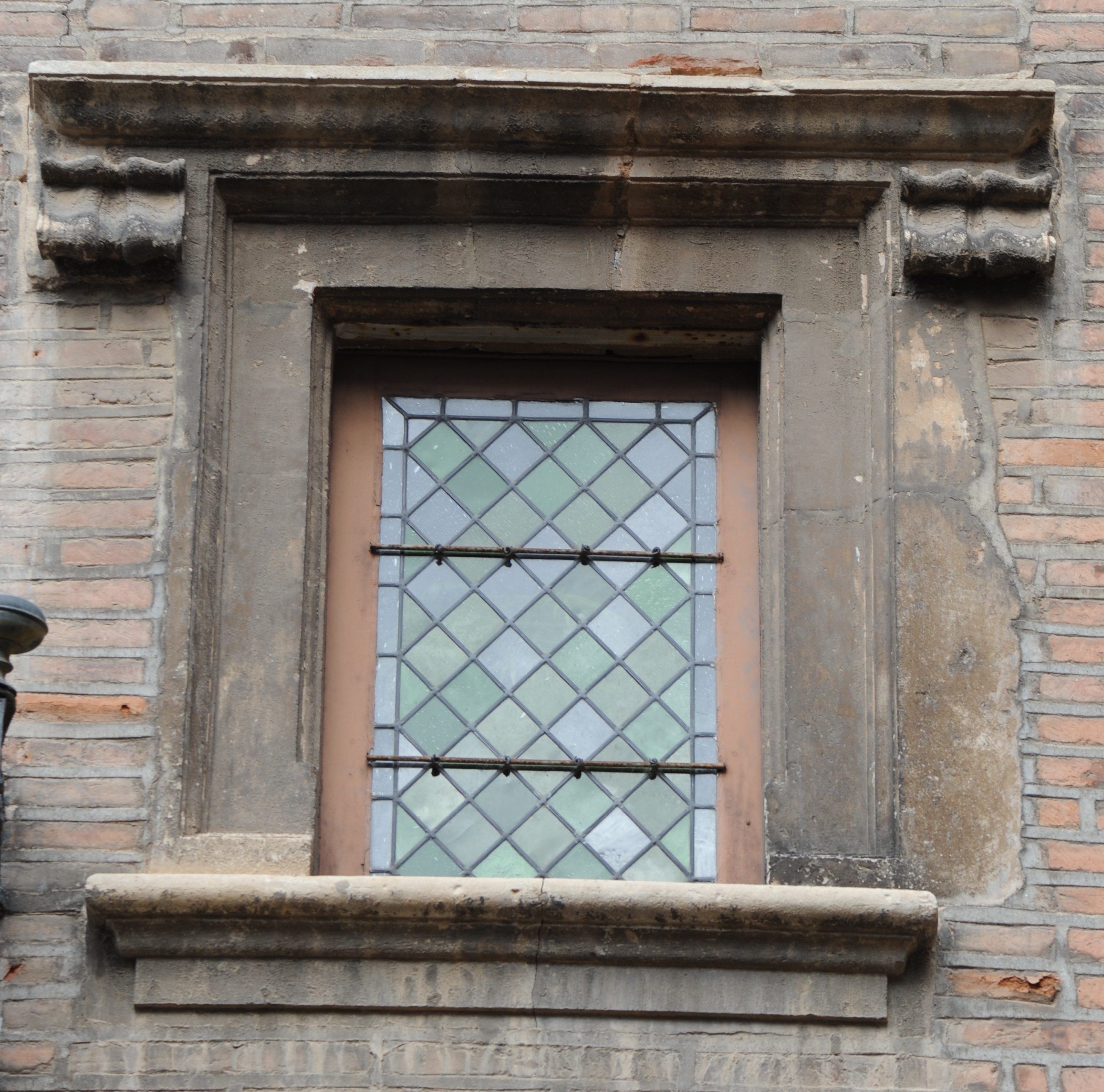
Hôtel d'Ulmo (tower).

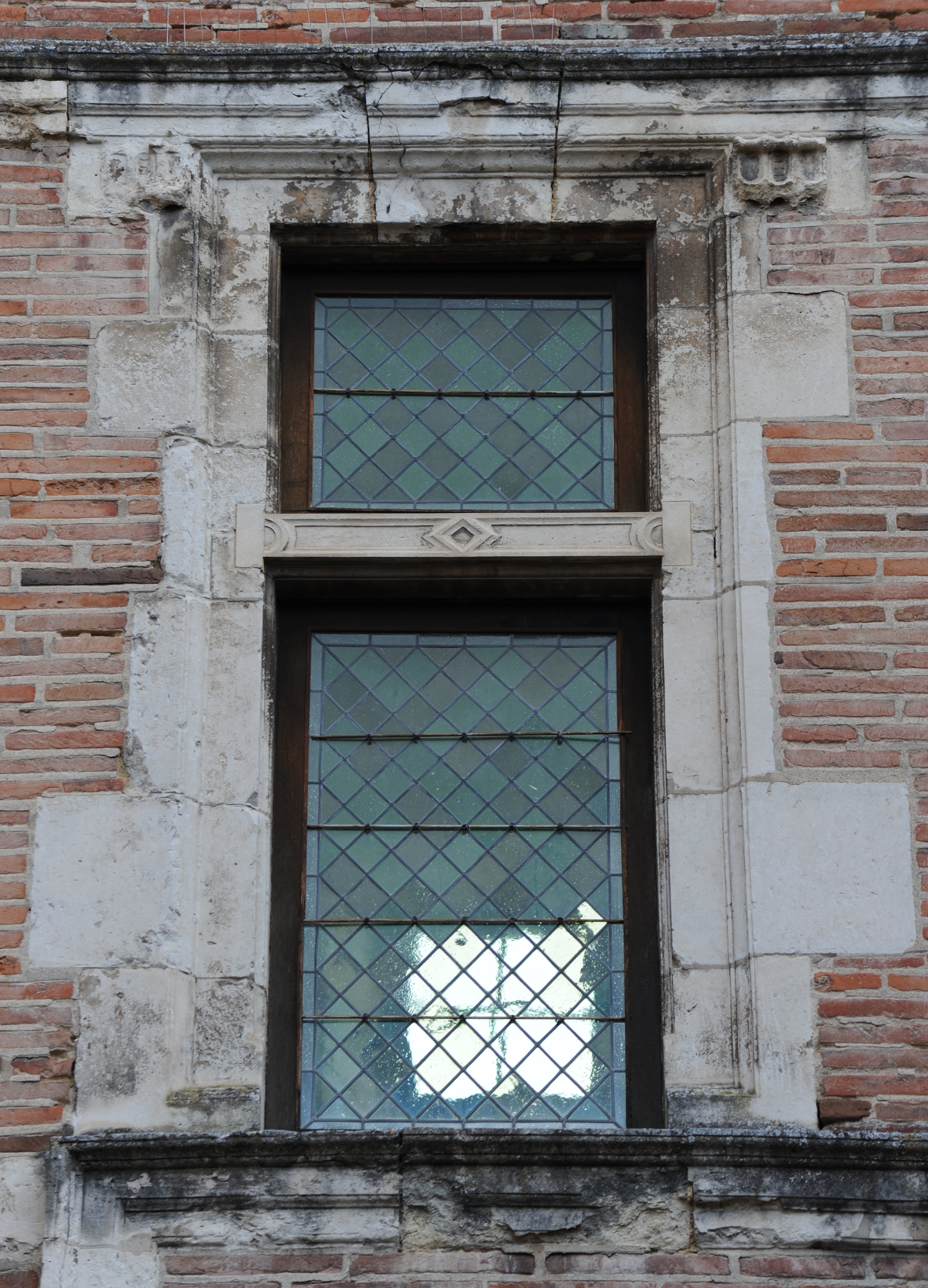
Hôtel d'Ulmo.

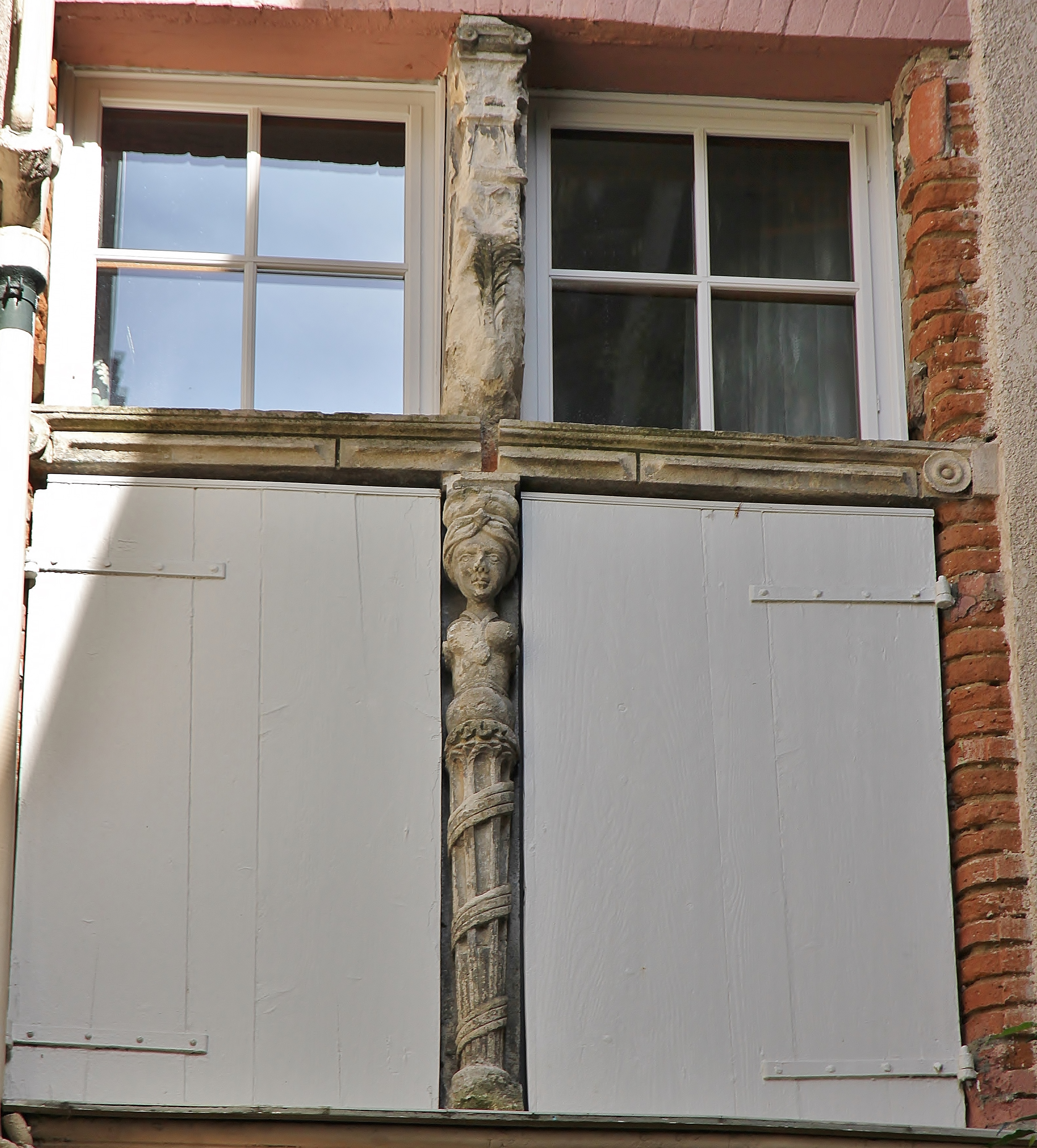
18 rue des Paradoux (courtyard).

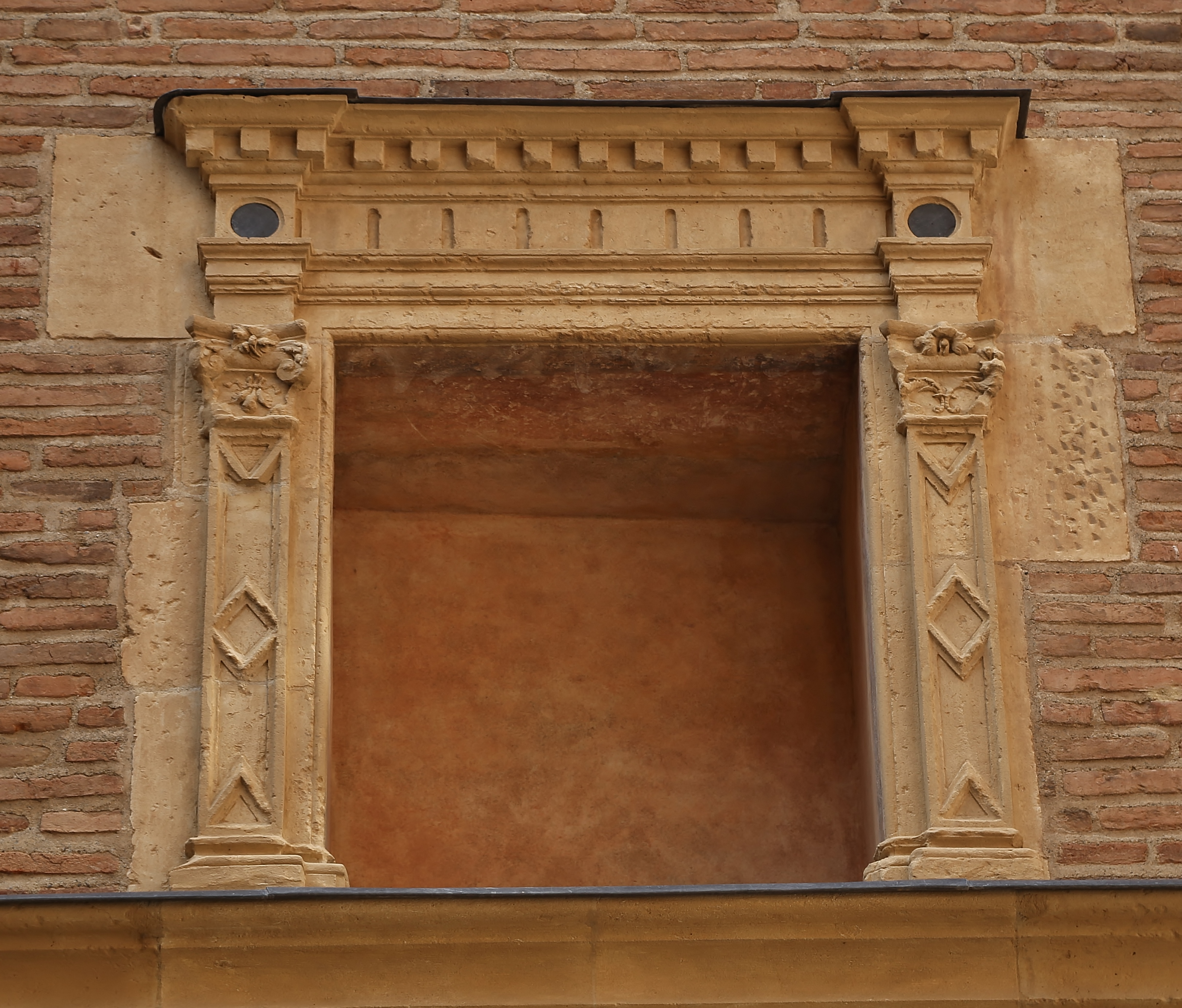
Hôtel de Bernuy.

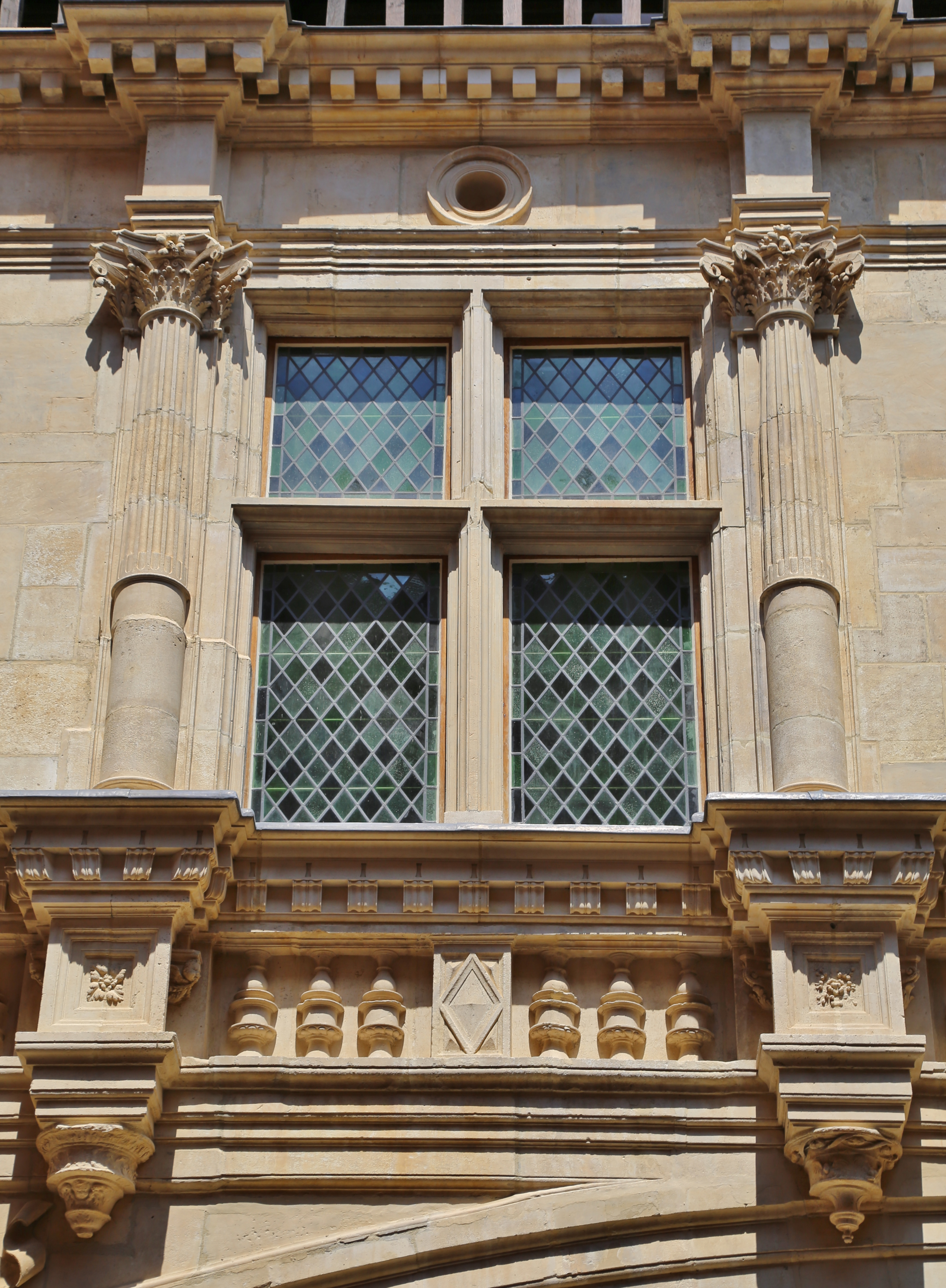
Hôtel de Bernuy.

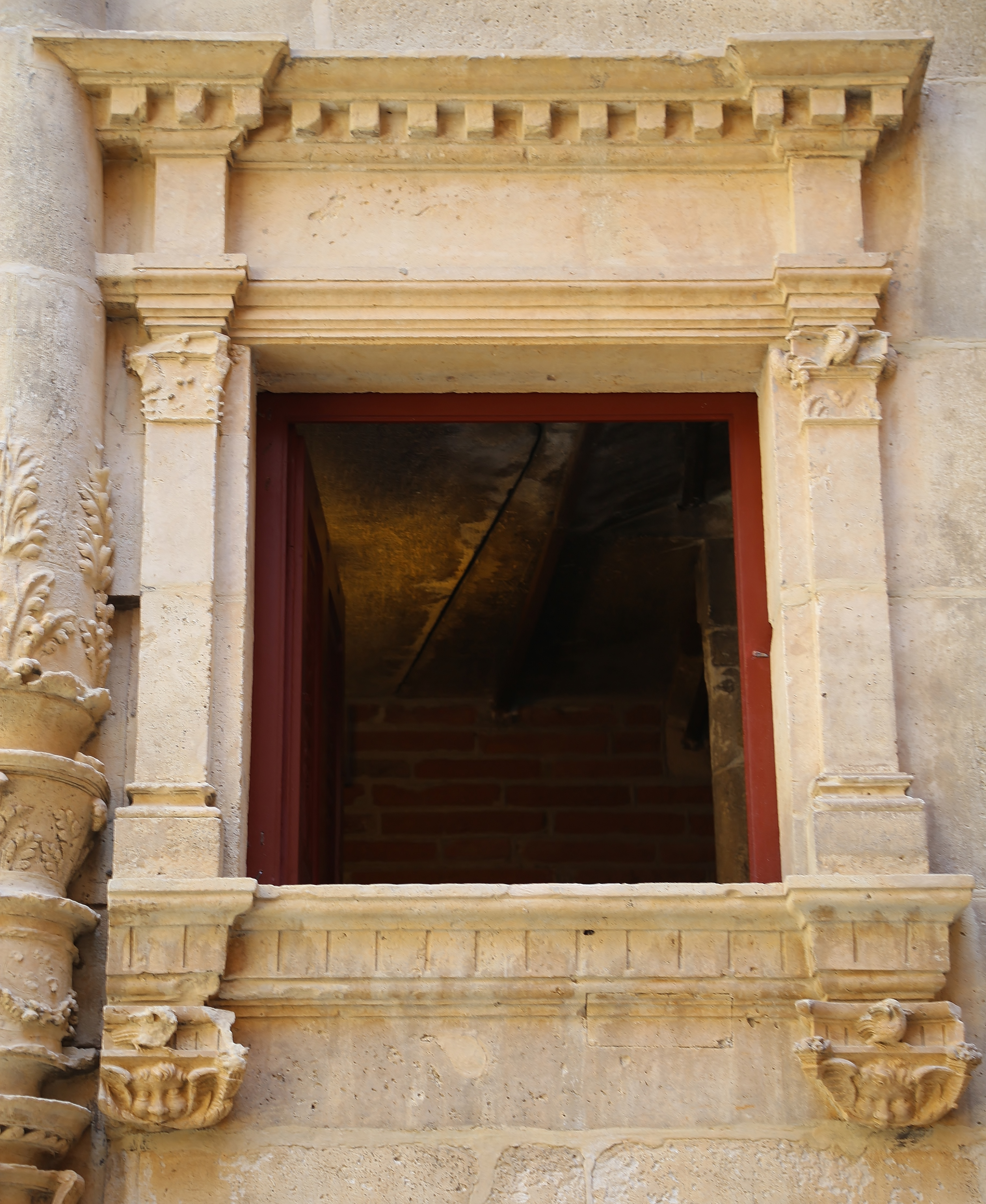
Hôtel de Bernuy.

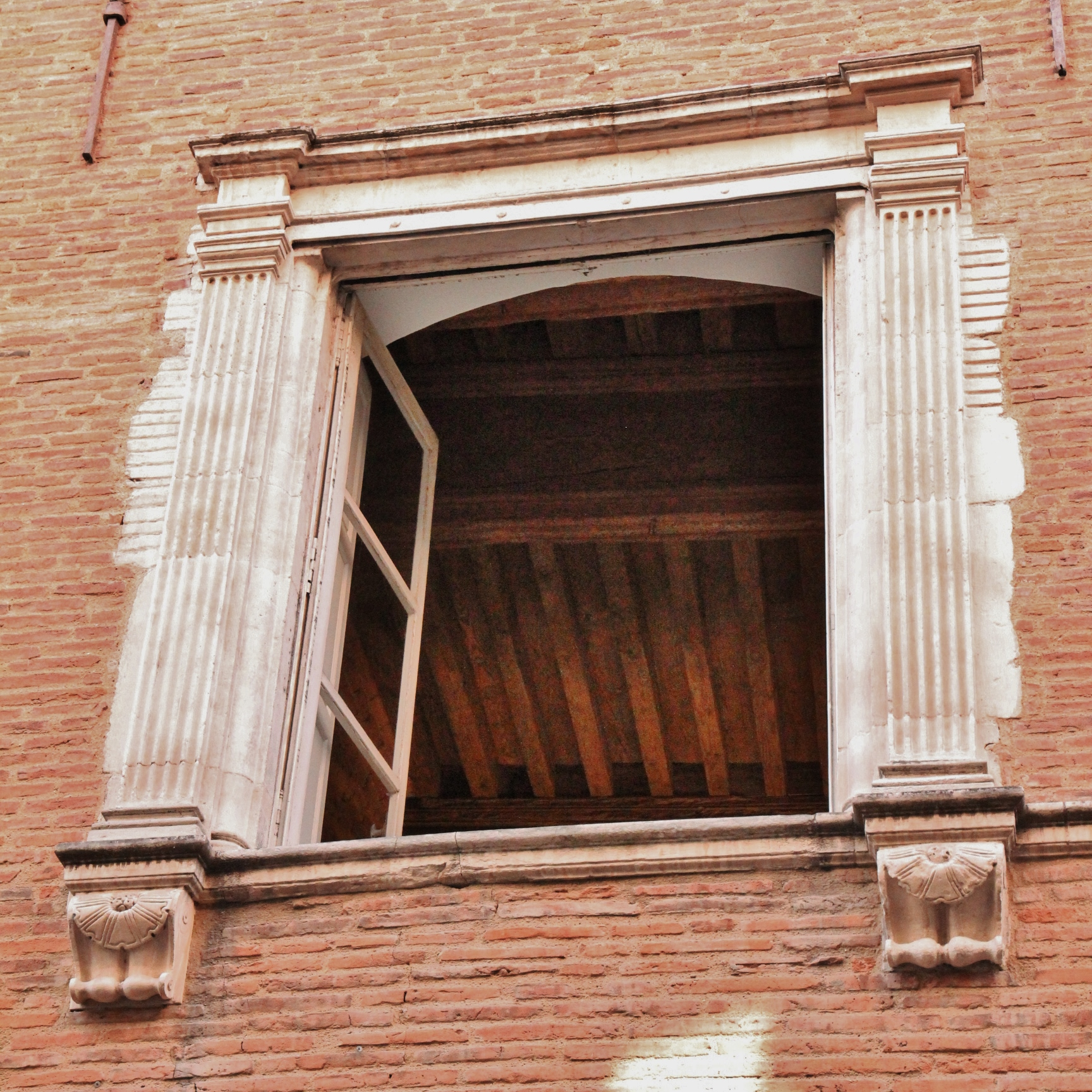
Hôtel d'Astorg (street).

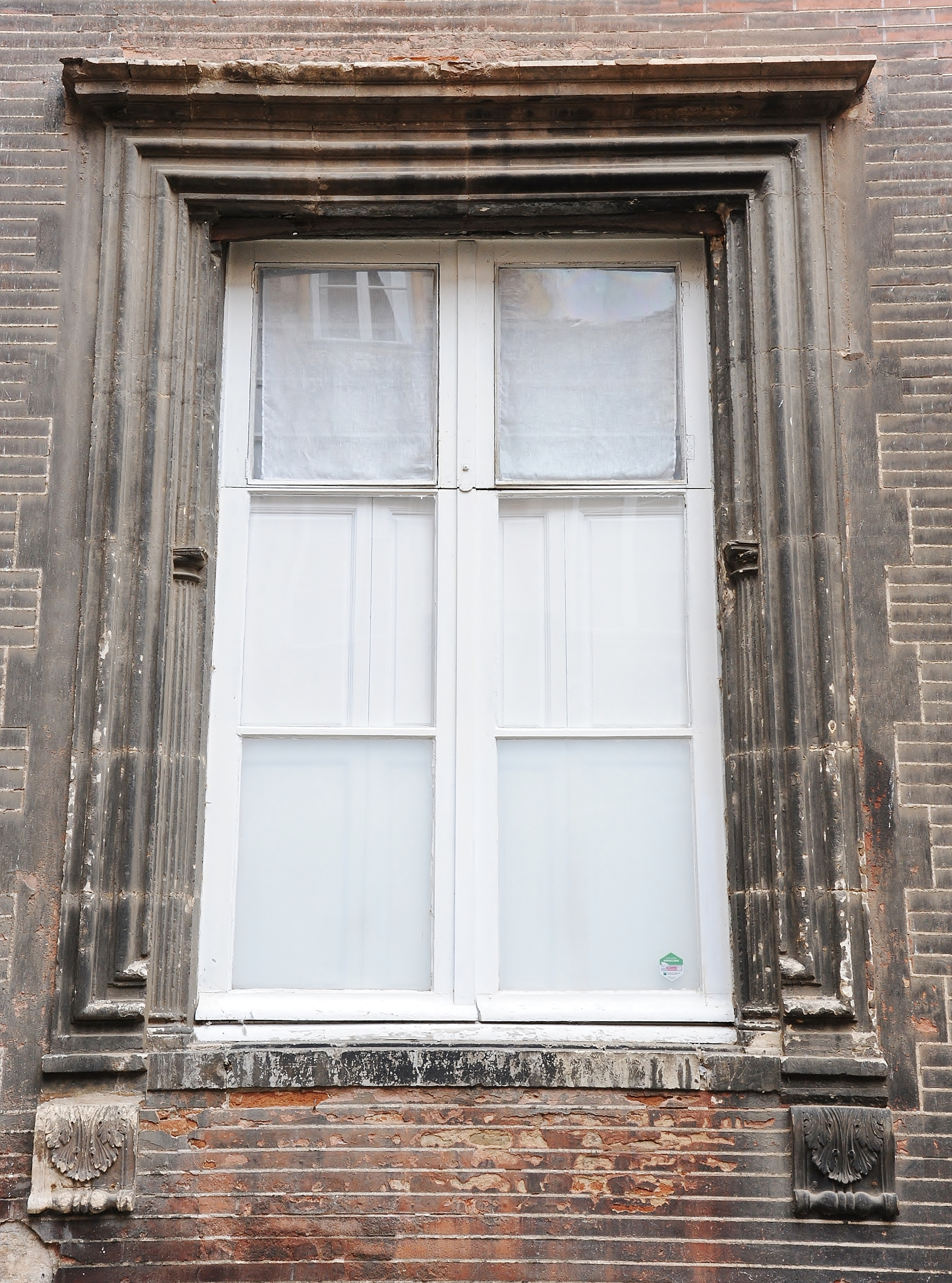
Hôtel de Bagis, ground floor.

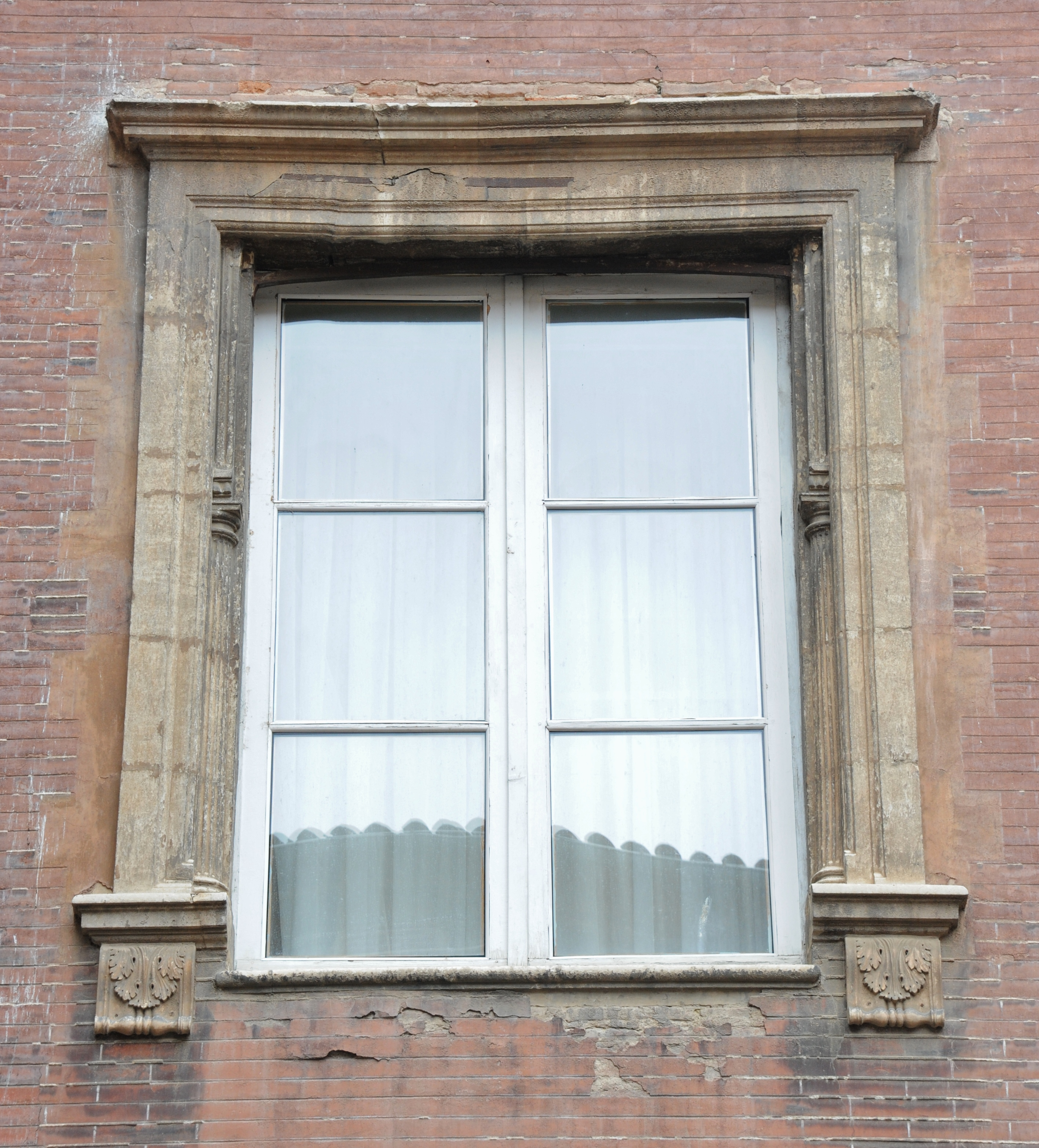
Hôtel de Bagis, first floor.

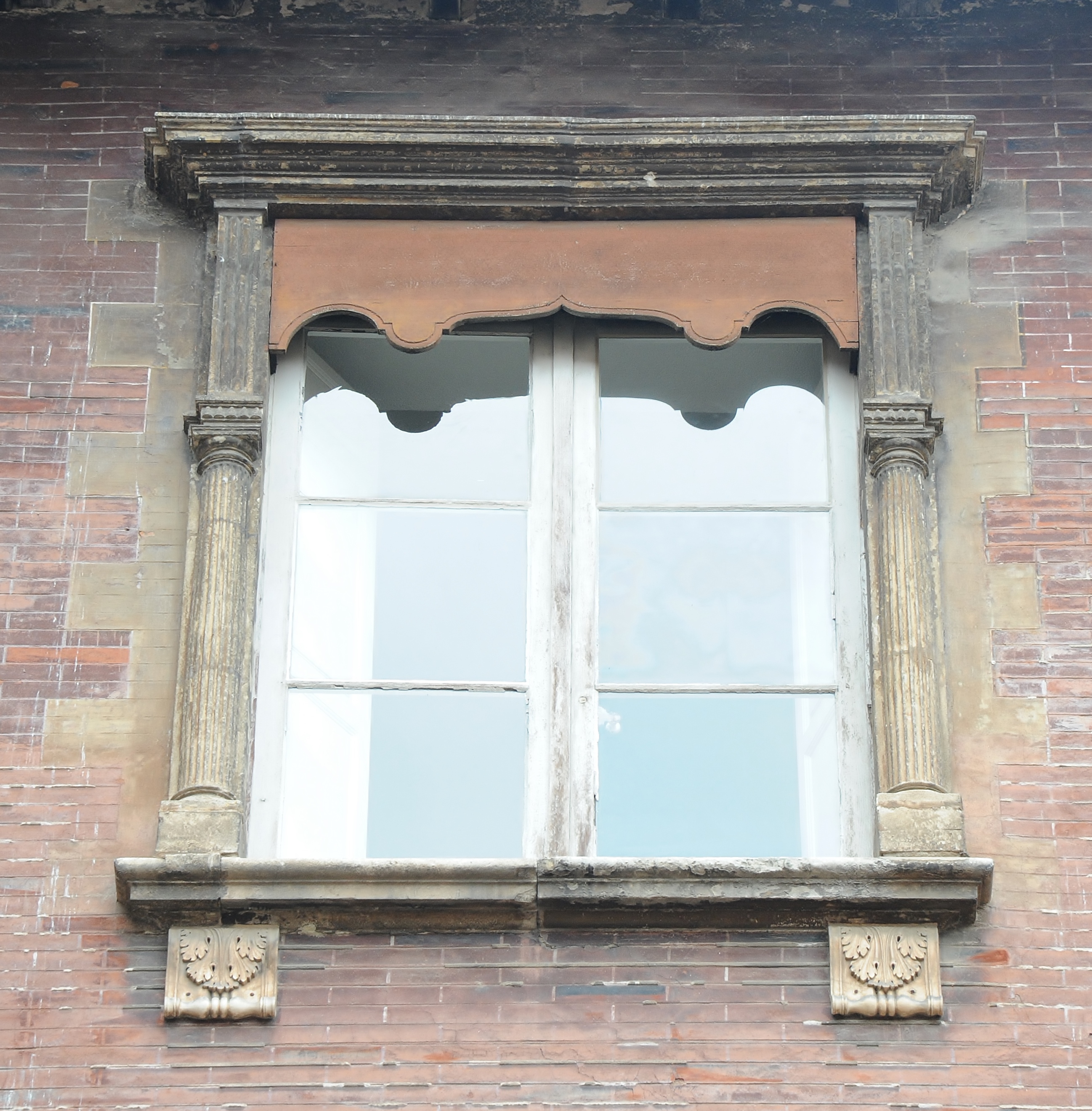
Hôtel de Bagis, second floor.

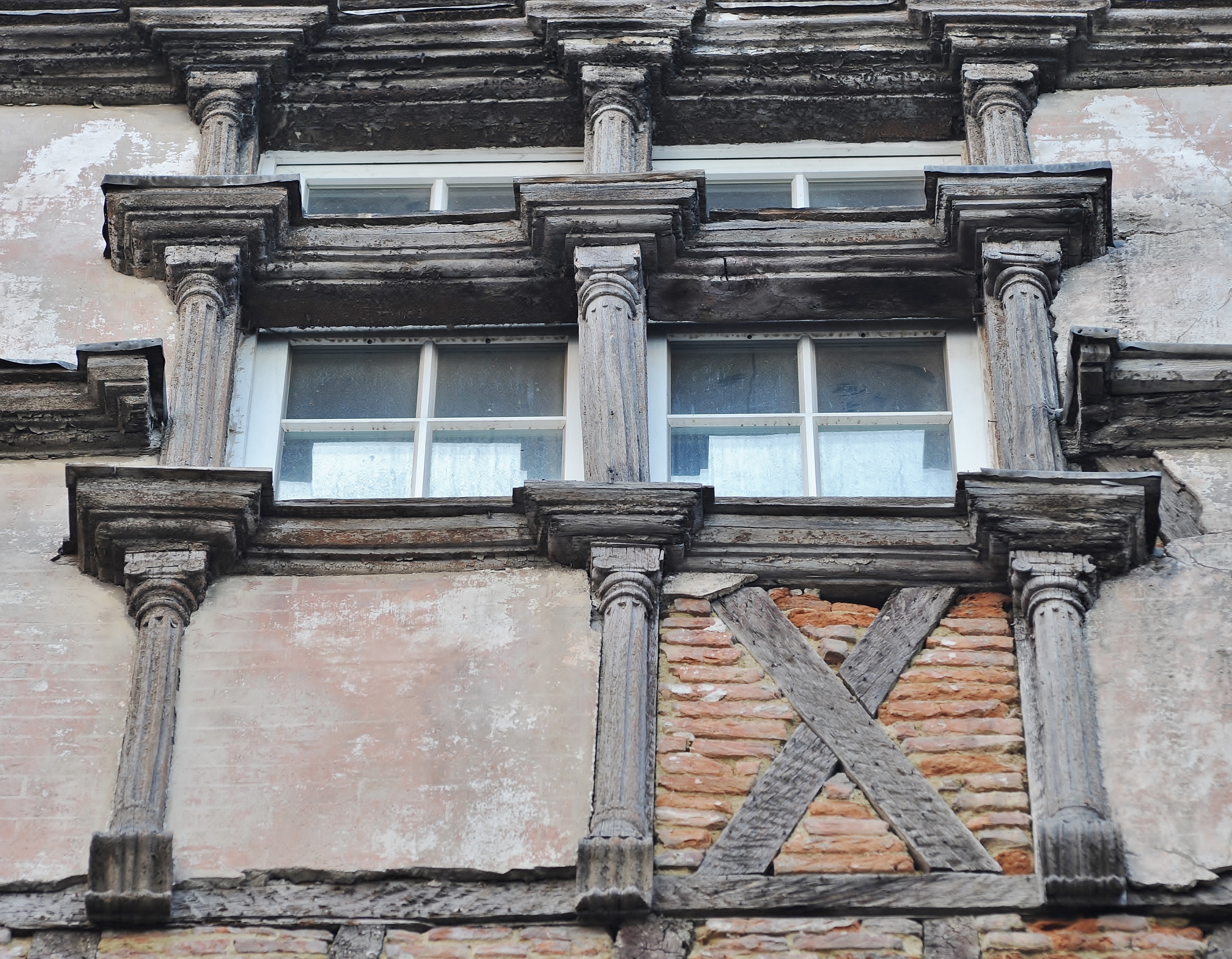
Hôtel Boscredon (wooden).

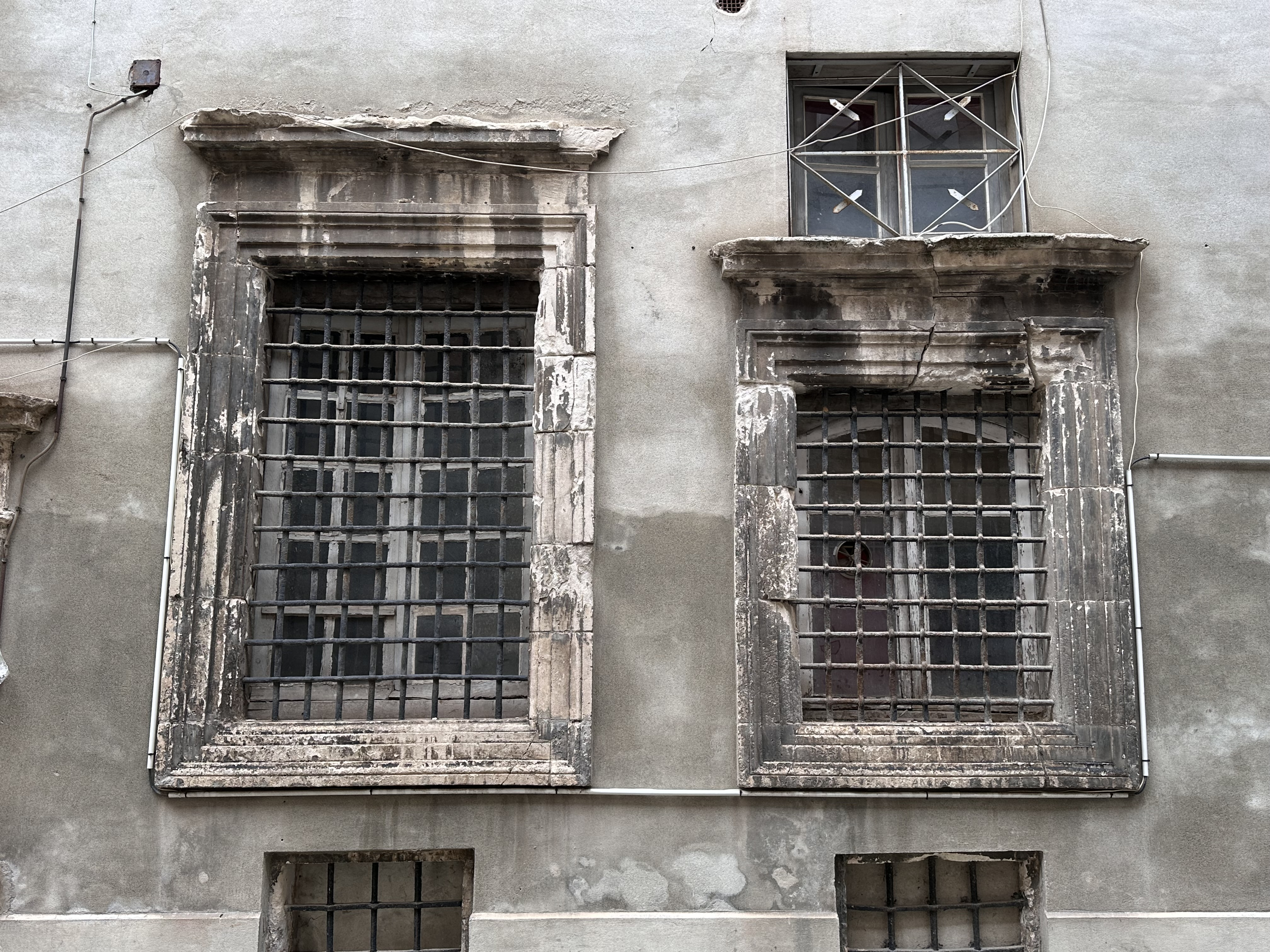
14 rue des Gestes, courtyard.

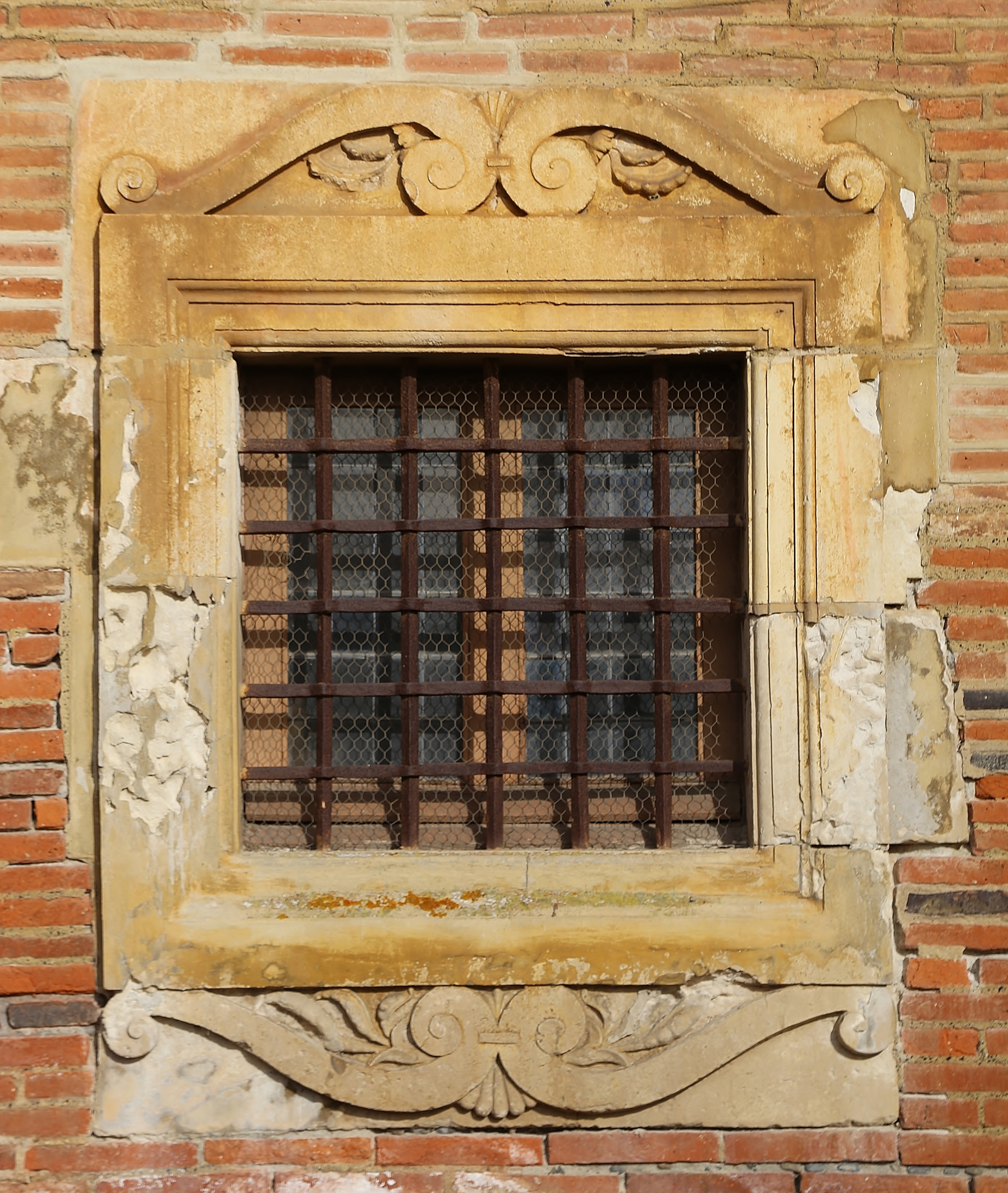
Castle of Pibrac, ground floor.

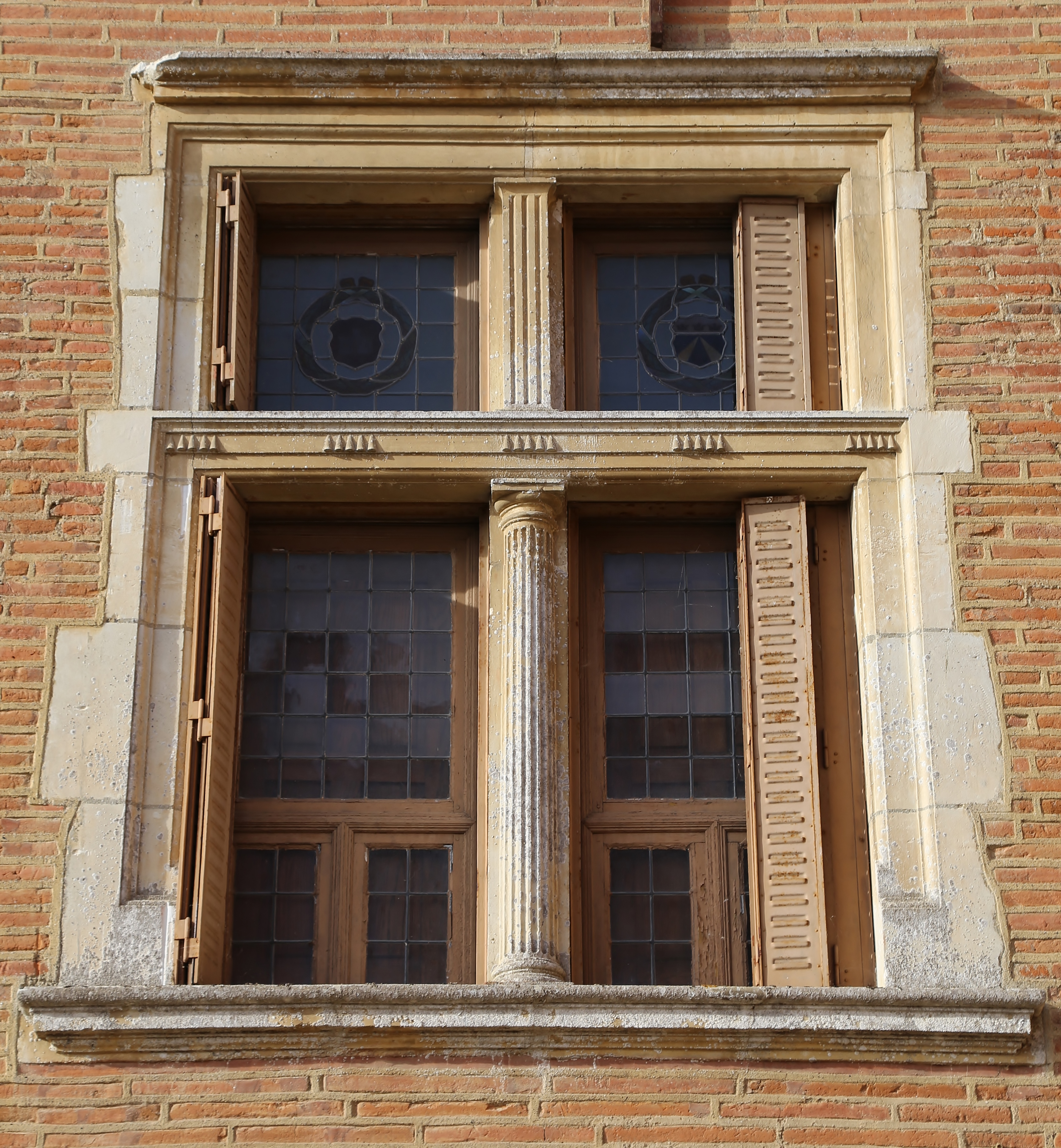
Castle of Pibrac, first floor.

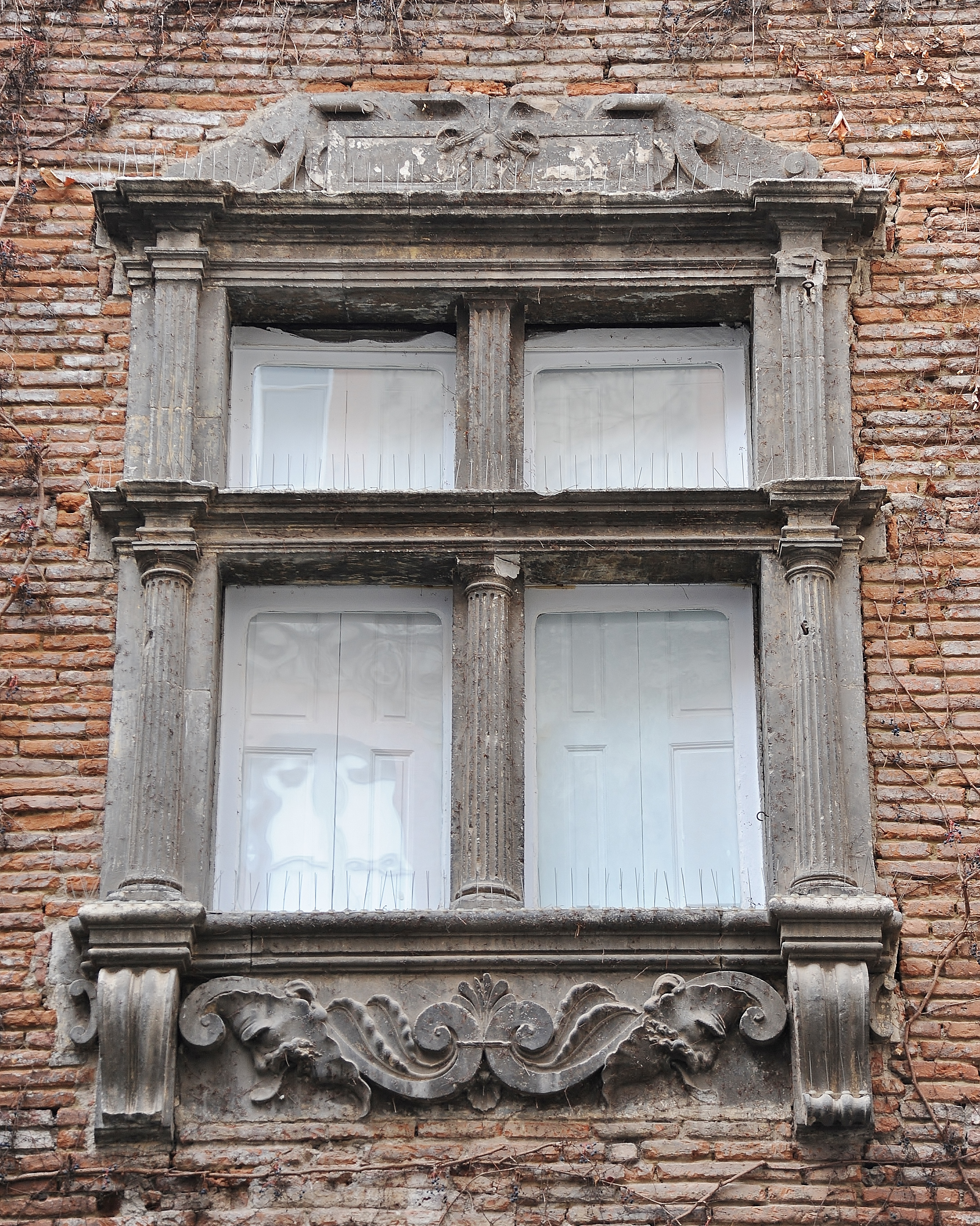
Hôtel de Guillaume de Bernuy.

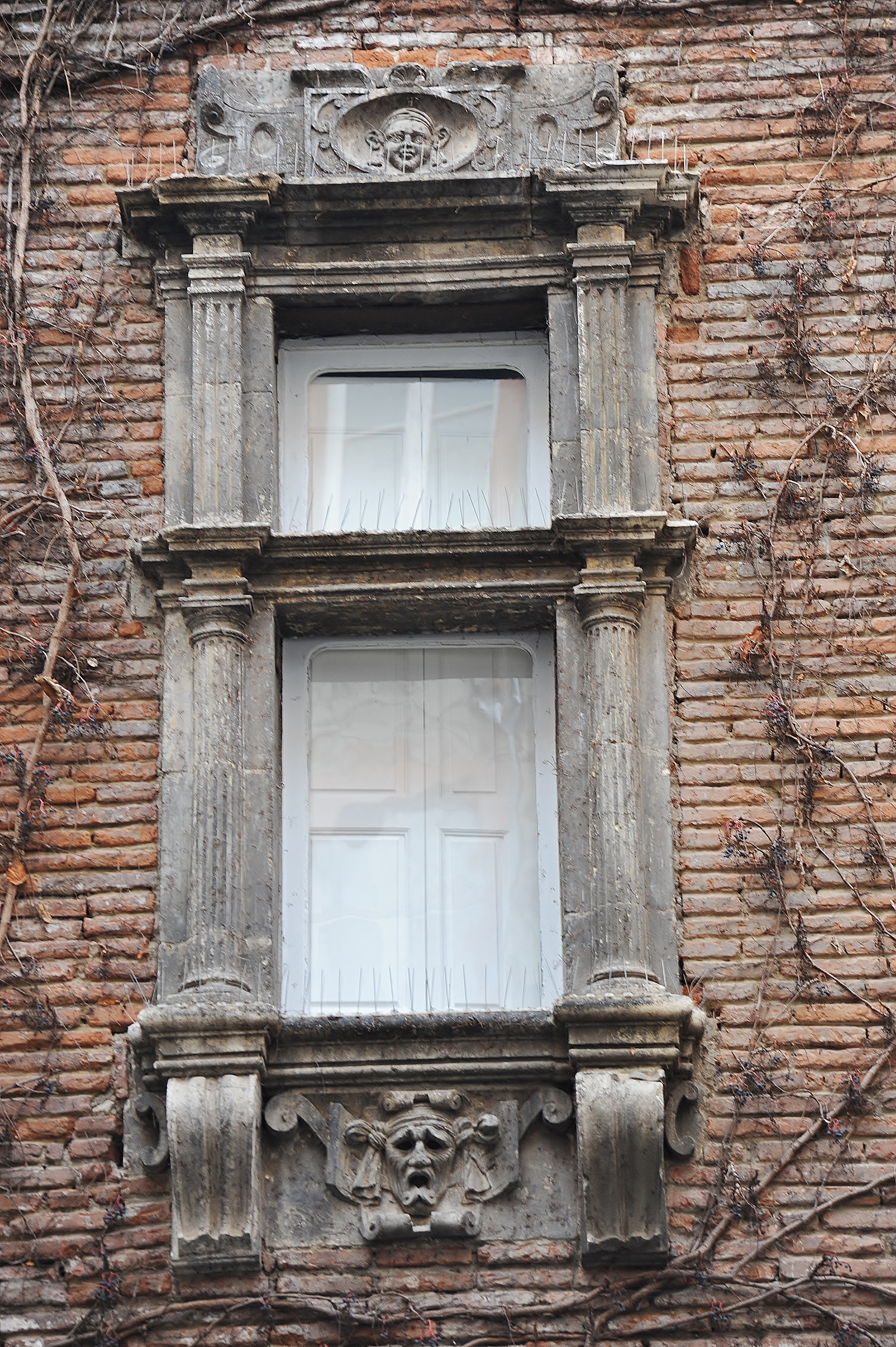
Hôtel de Guillaume de Bernuy (aka Hôtel de Buet).

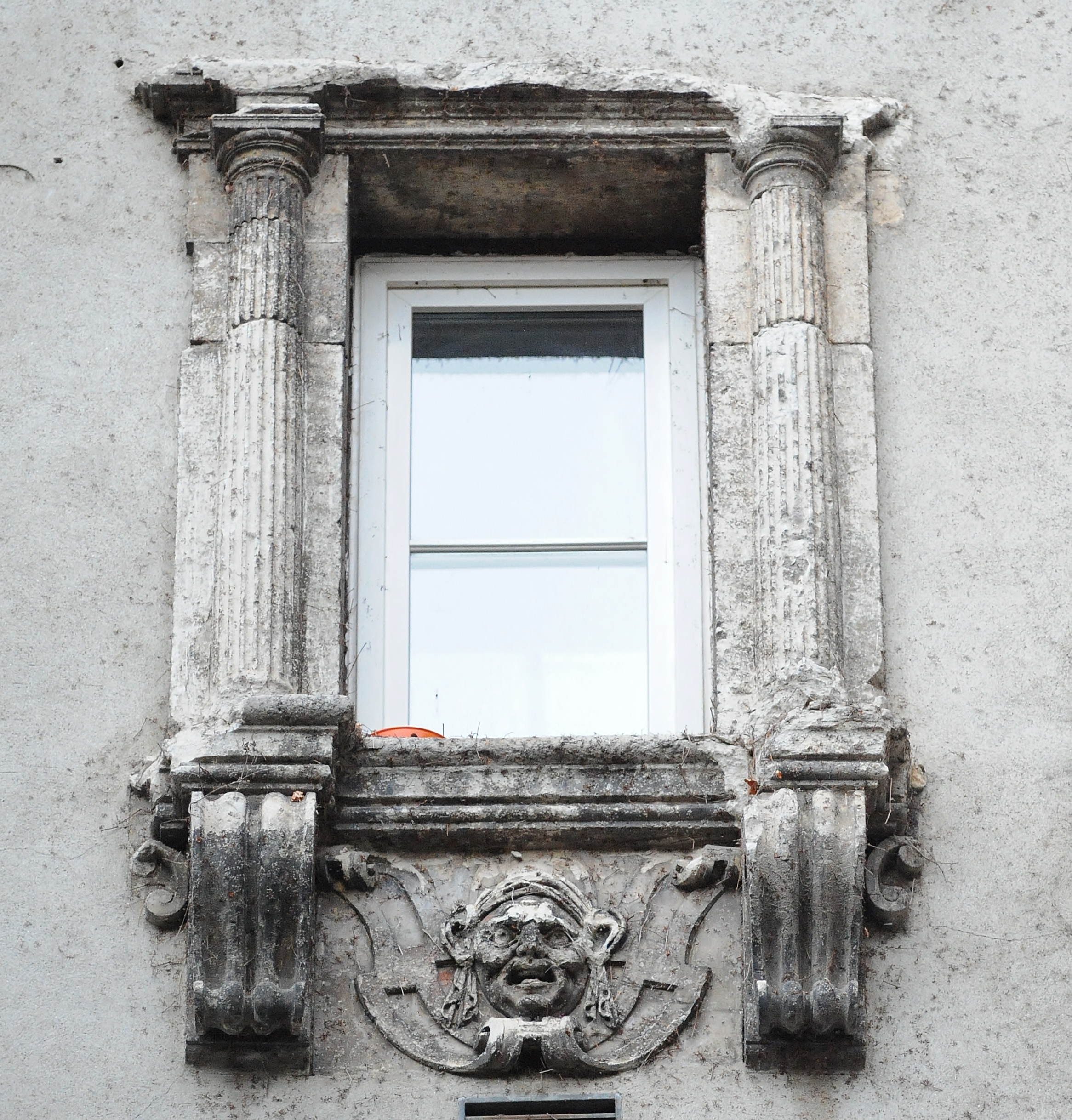
Hôtel de Guillaume de Bernuy.

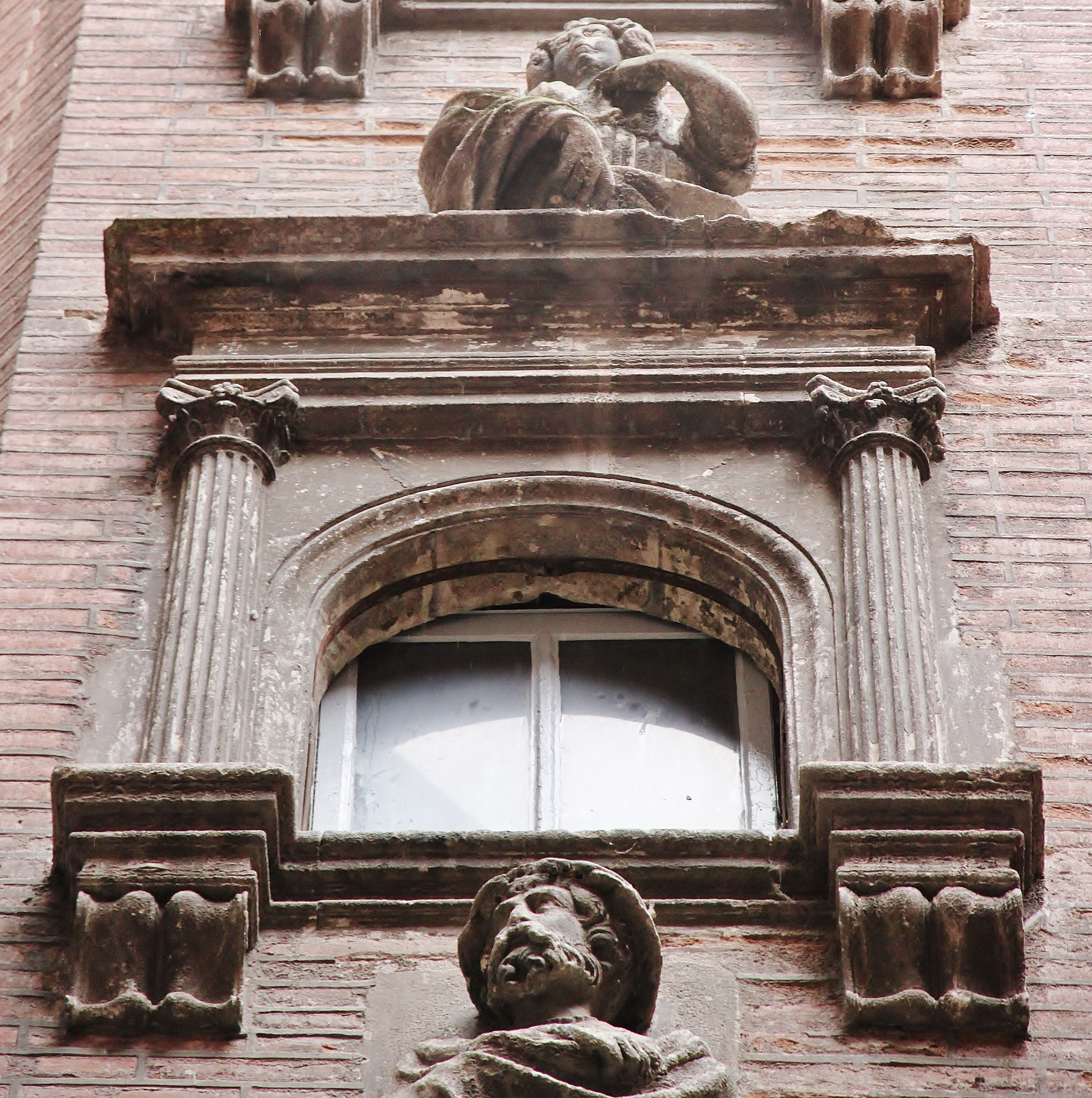
Hôtel de Brucelles (tower).

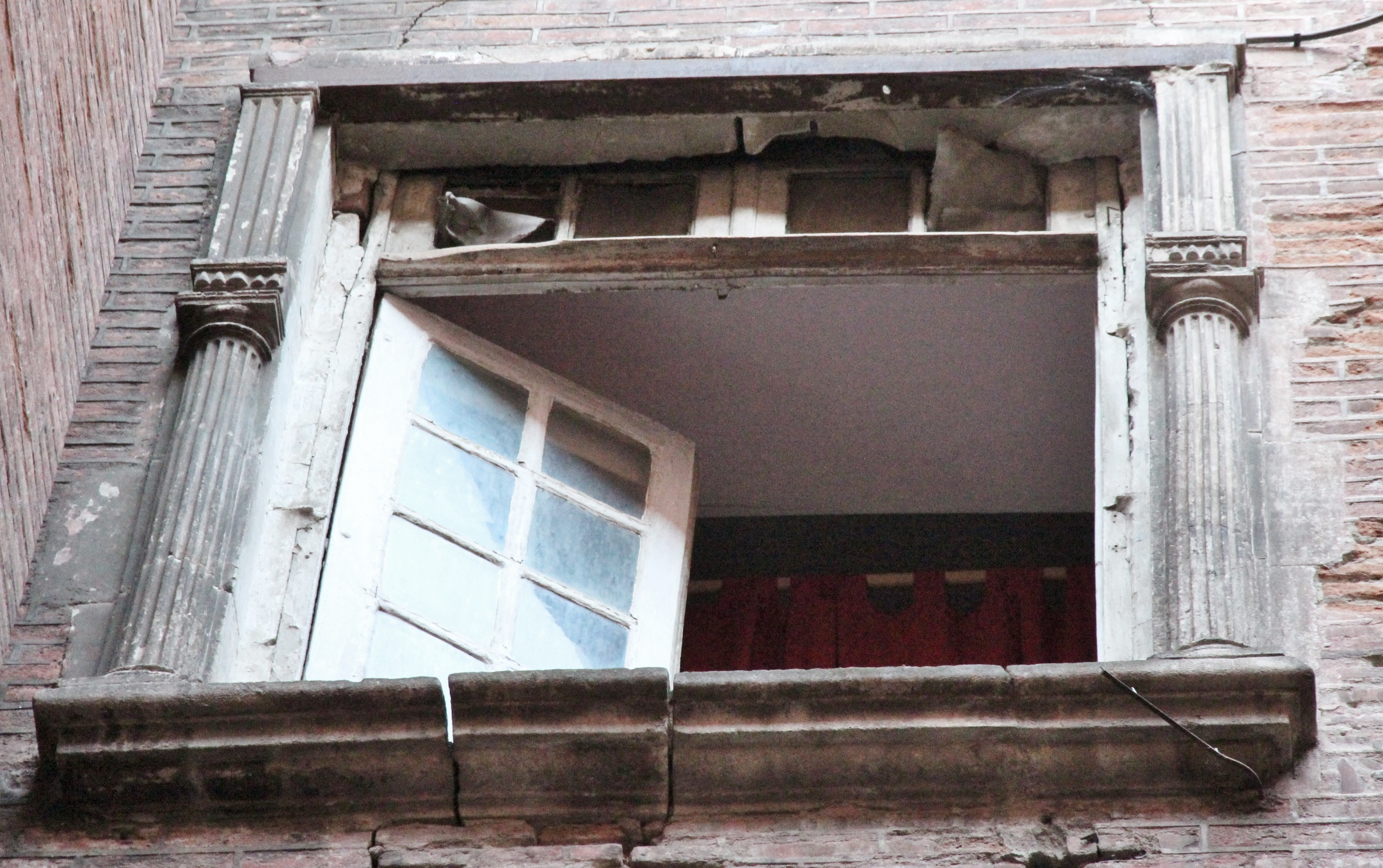
Hôtel de Brucelles.

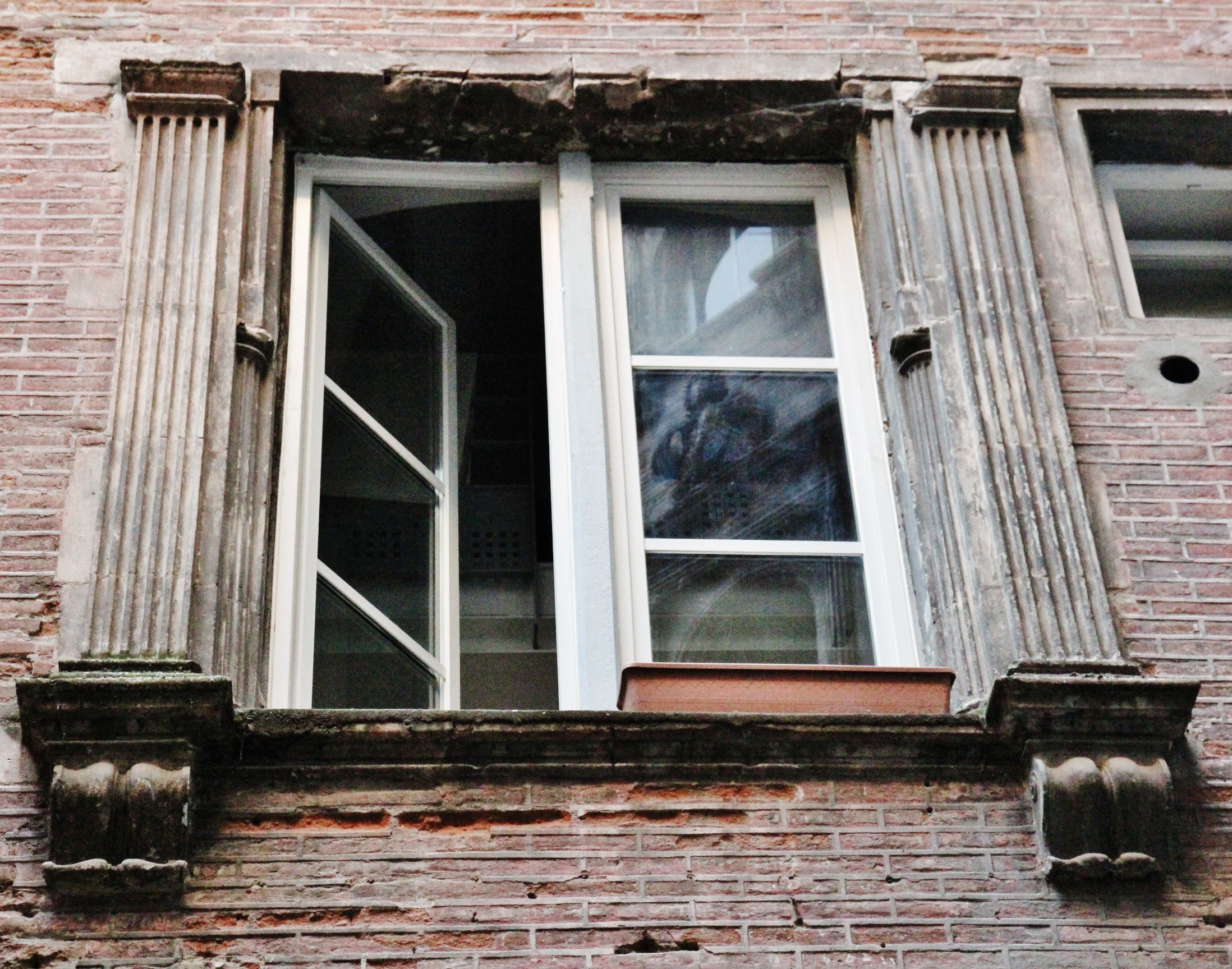
Hôtel de Brucelles.

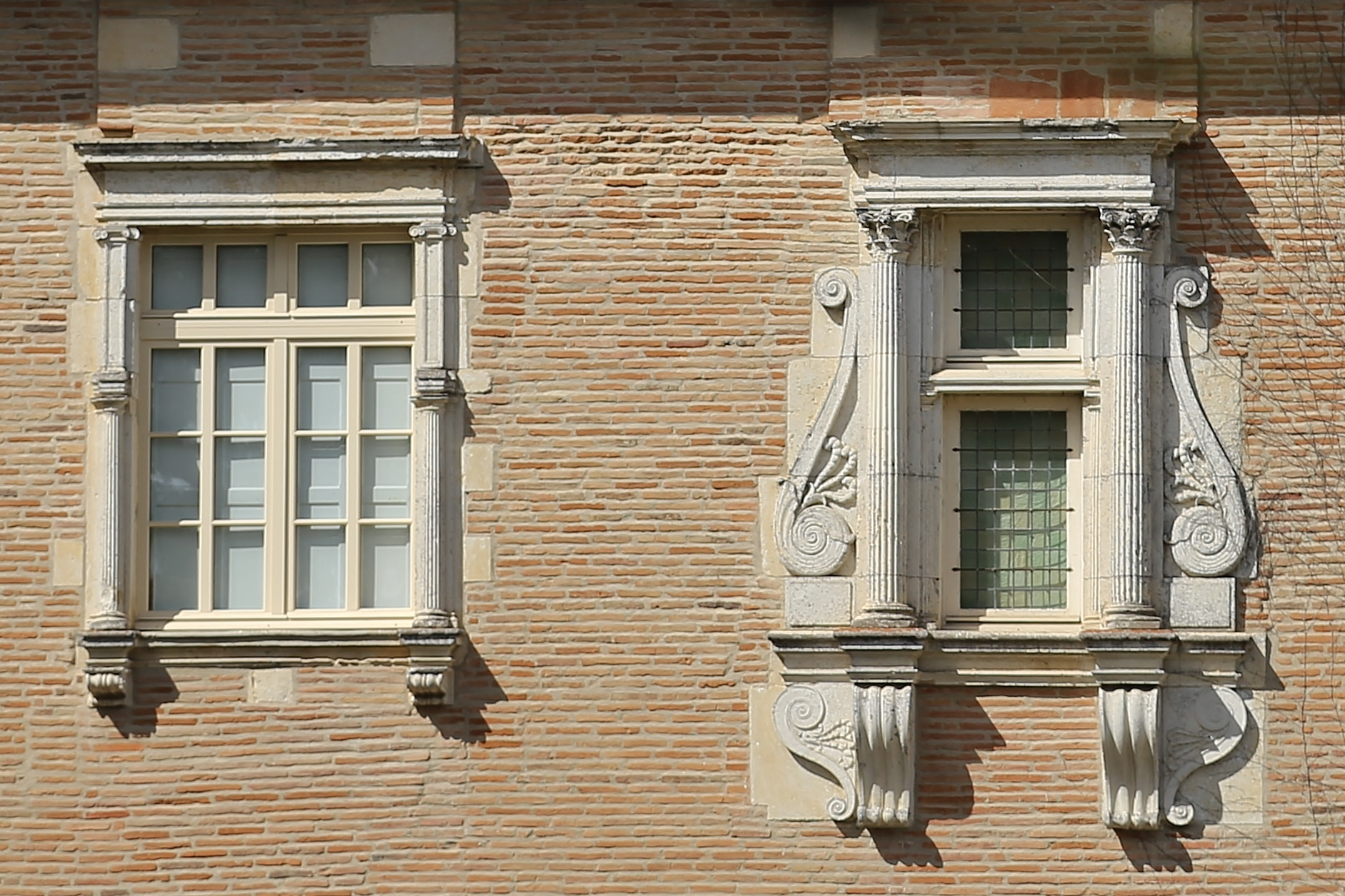
Saint-Jory Castle.

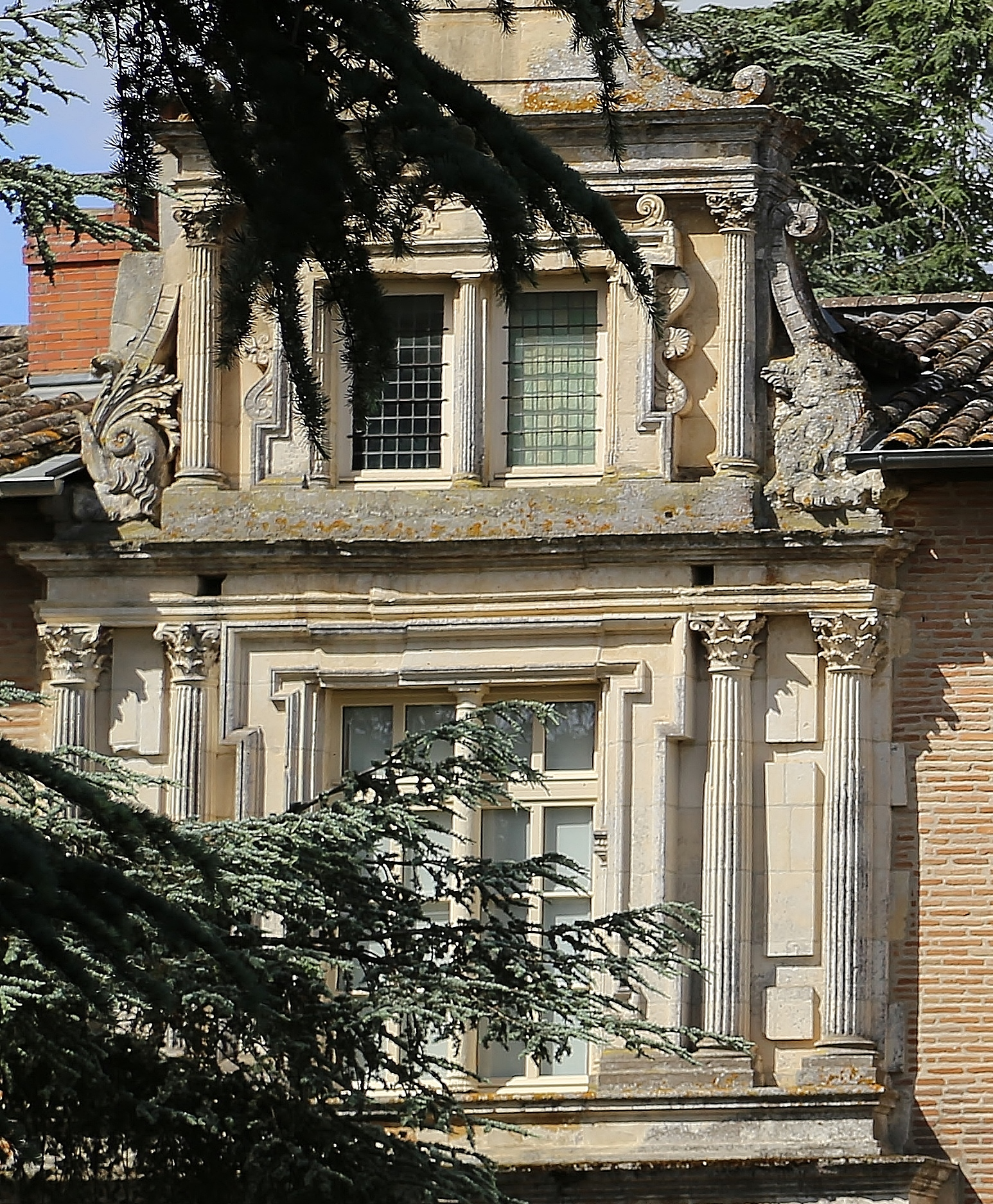
Saint-Jory Castle.

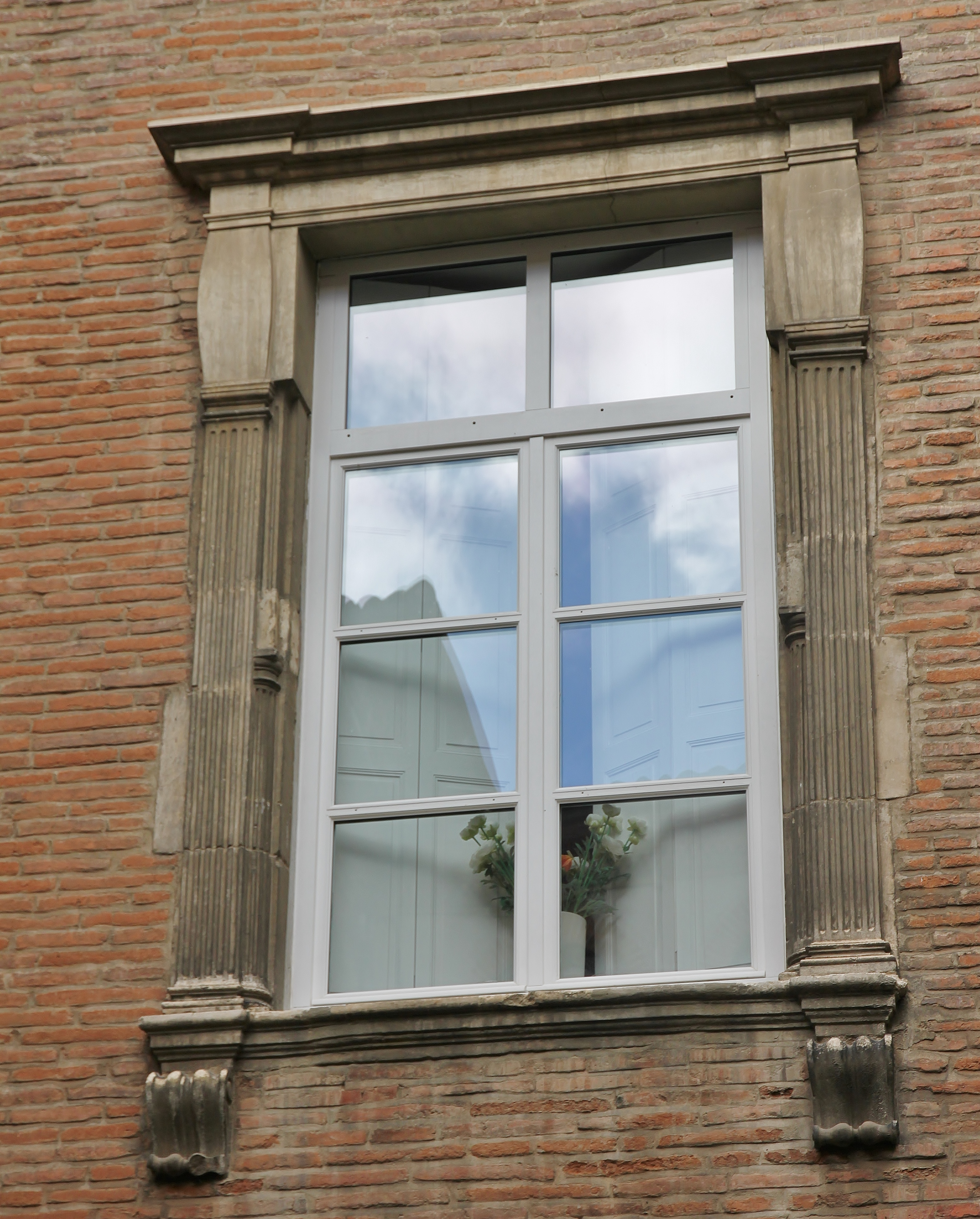
Hôtel Hébrard.

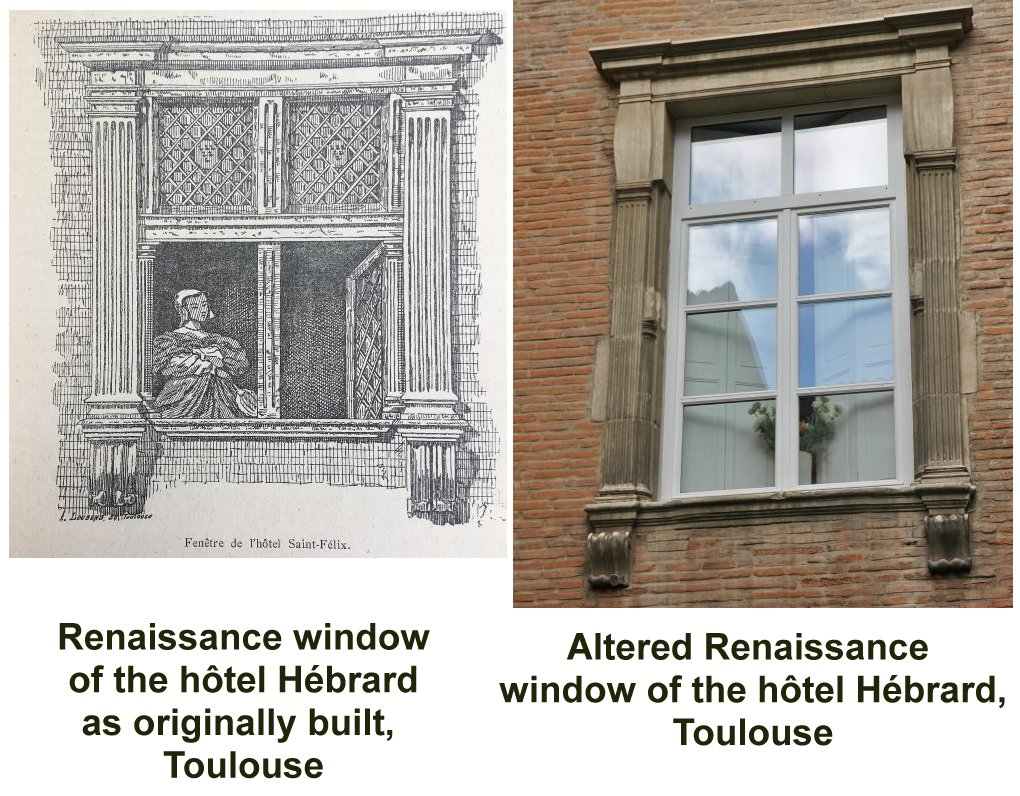
Hôtel Hébrard, alteration of a window.

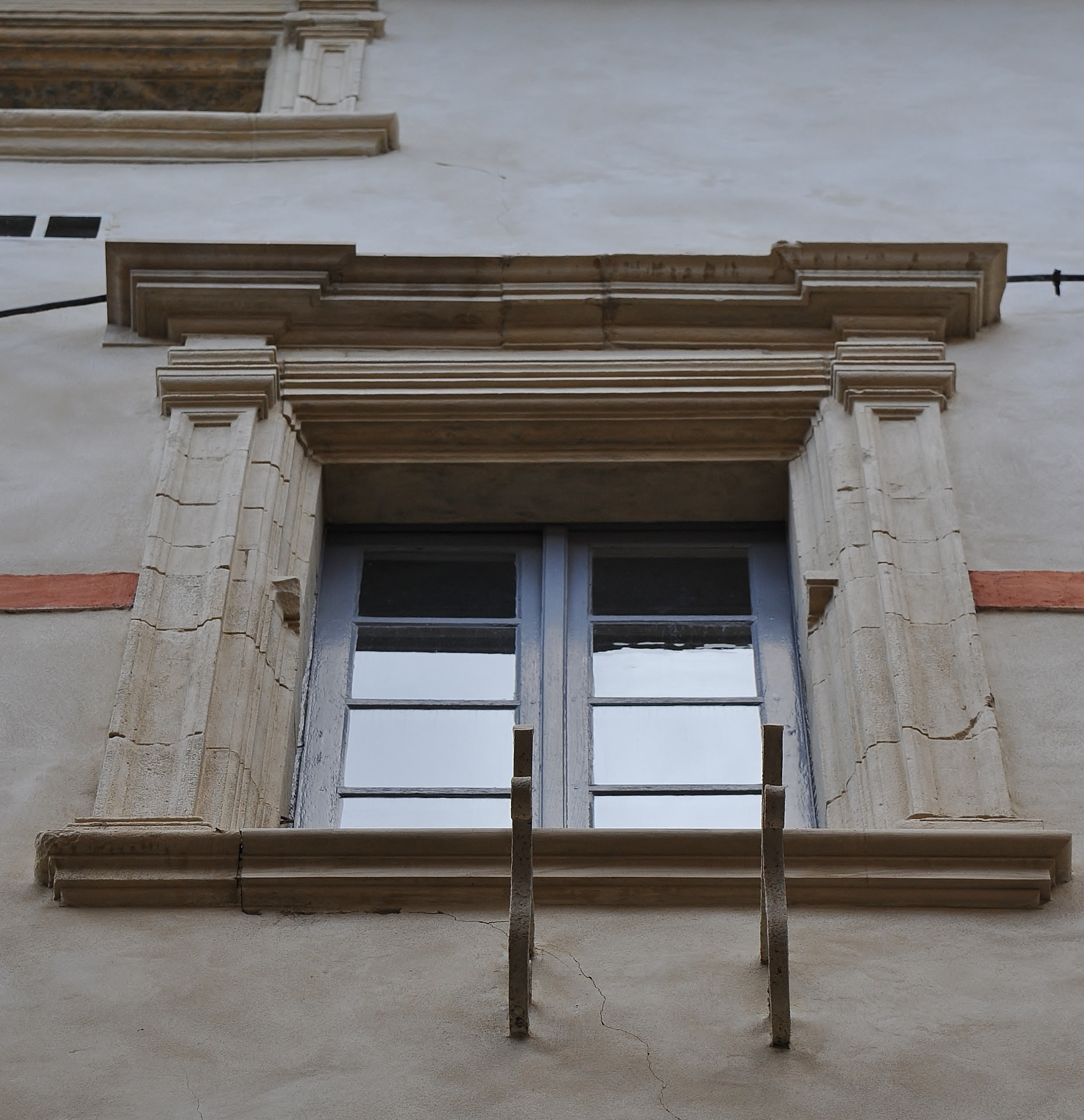
Hôtel d'Avizard.

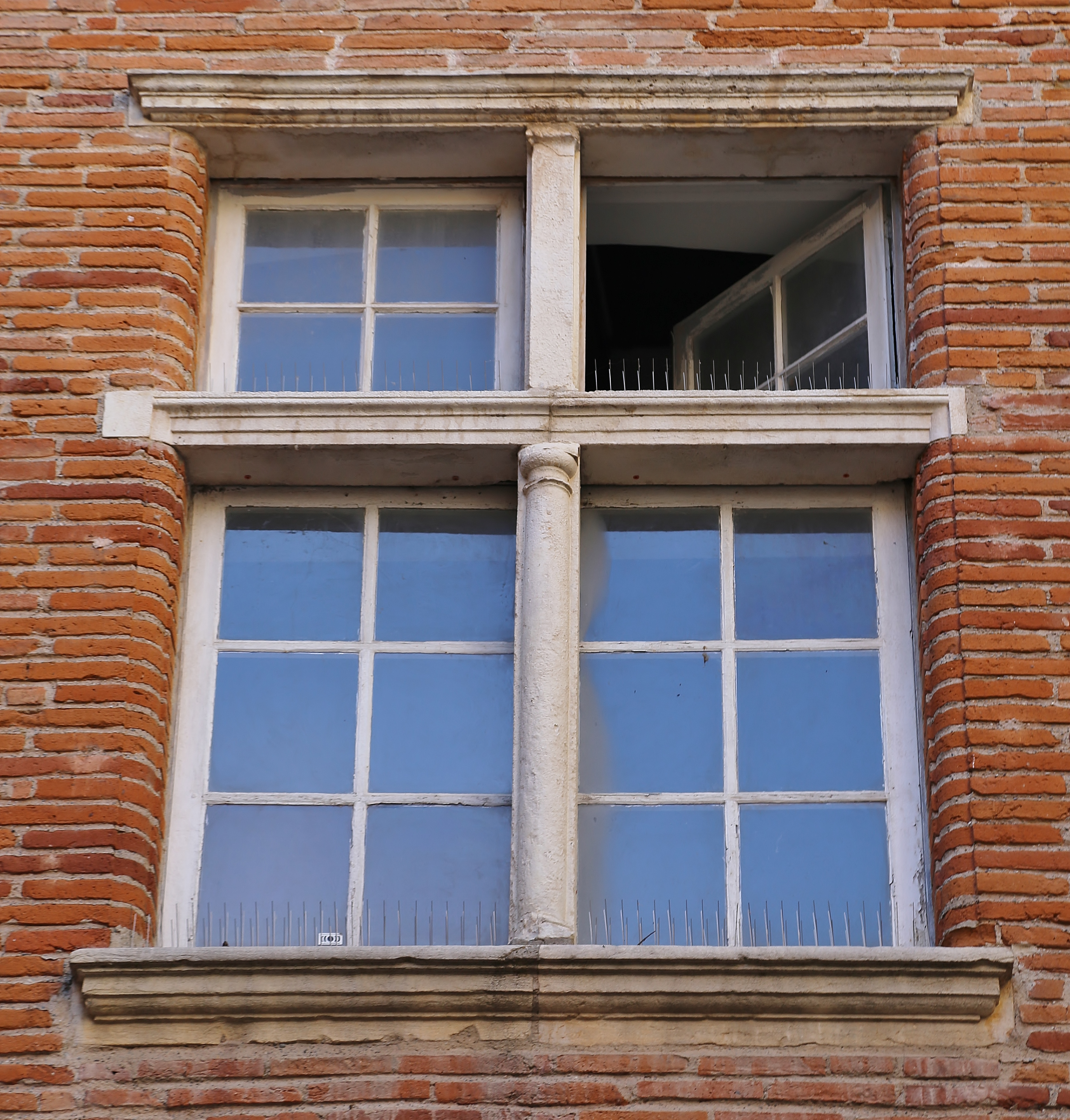
Hôtel Boysson-Cheverry (second courtyard).

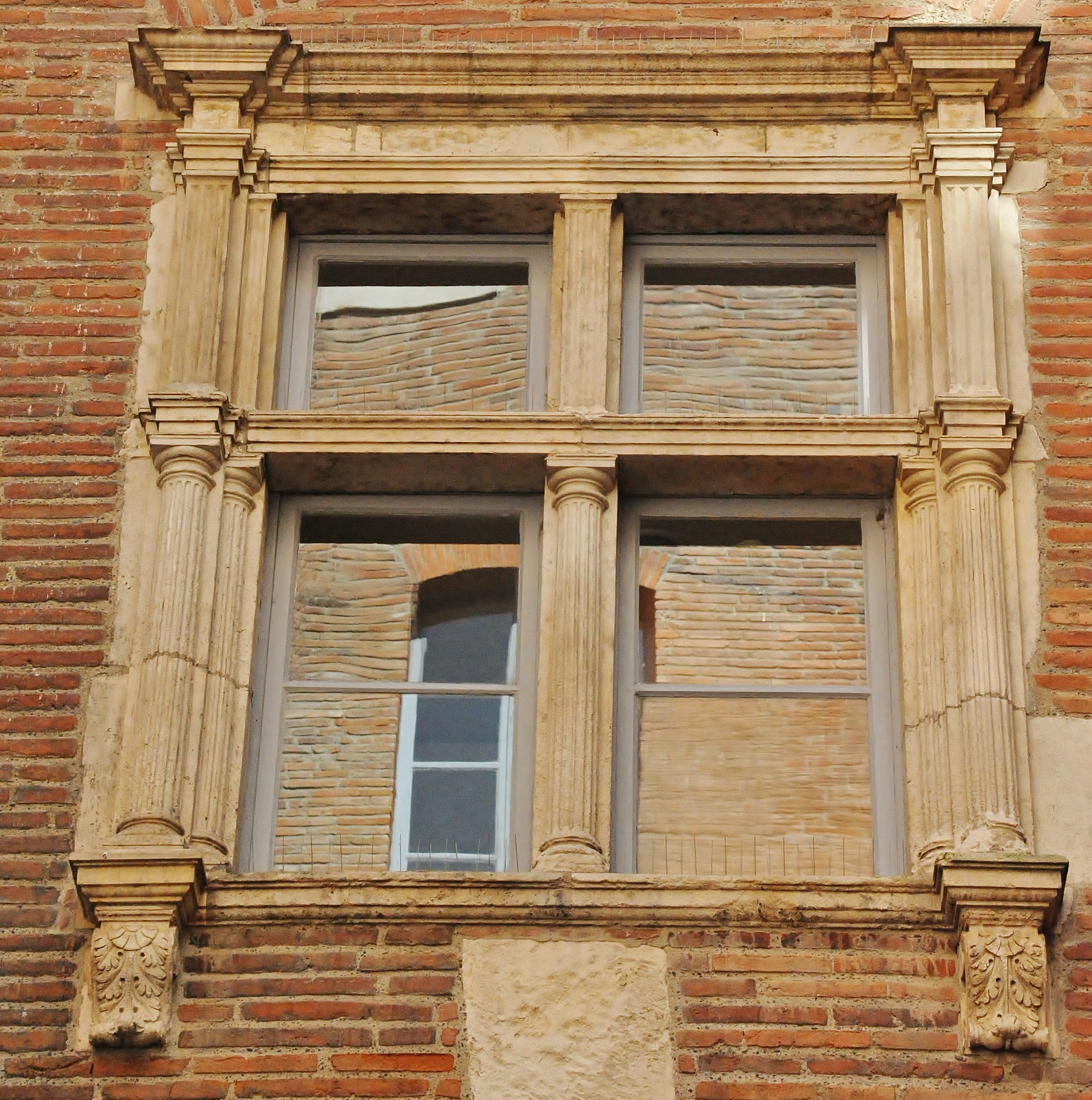
Hôtel Boysson-Cheverry (first courtyard).

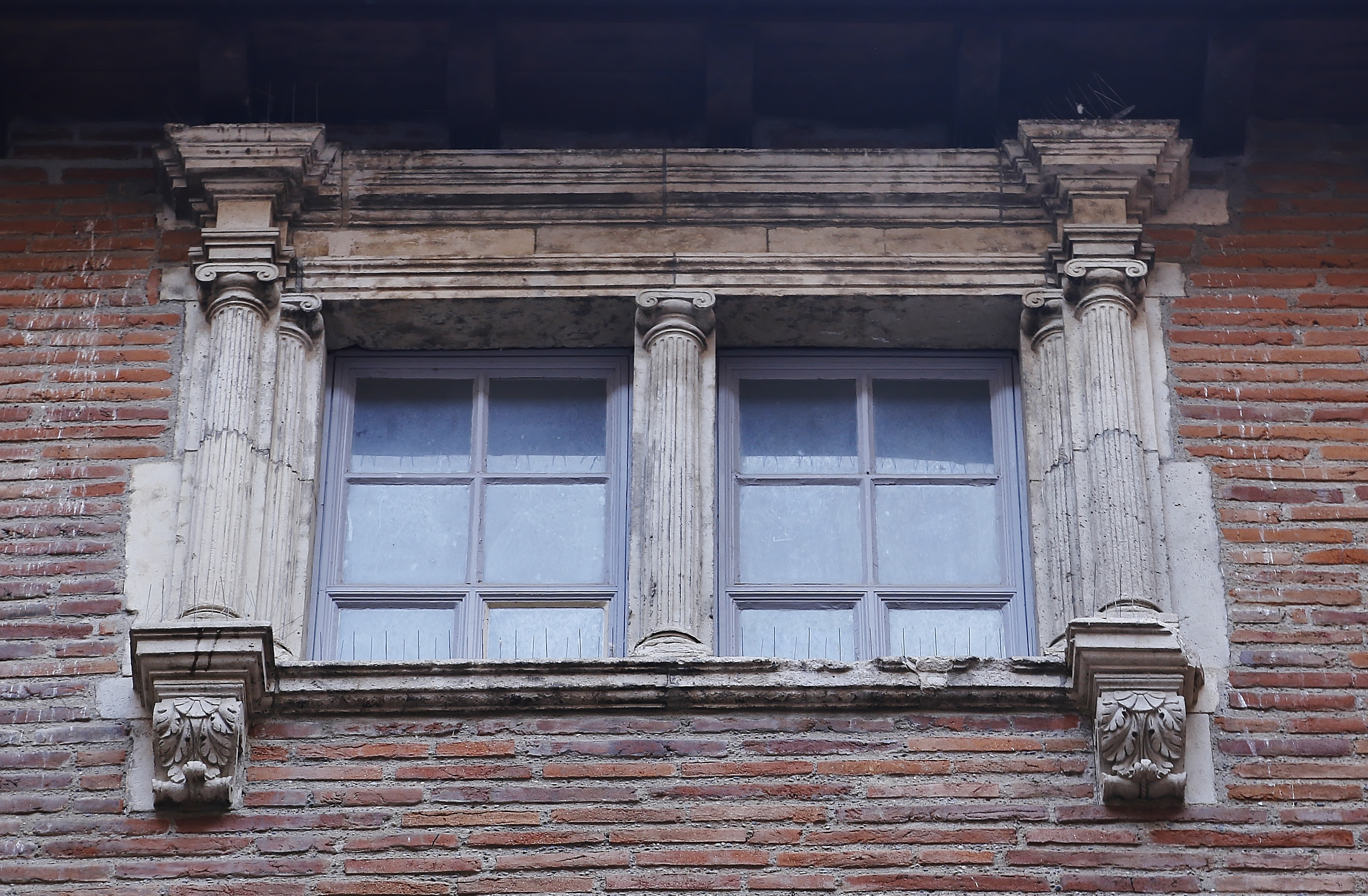
Hôtel Boysson-Cheverry (first courtyard).

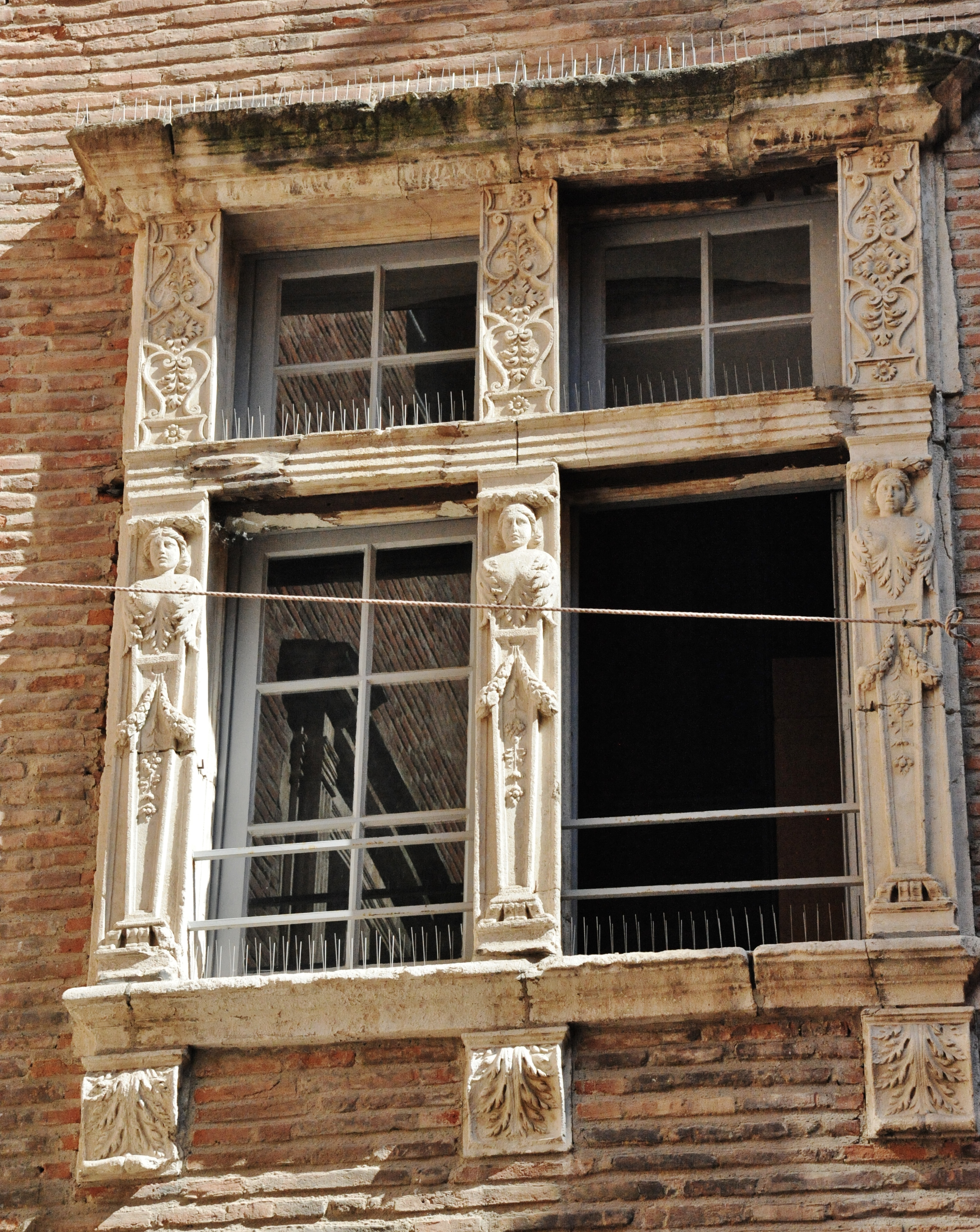
Hôtel Boysson-Cheverry (tower).

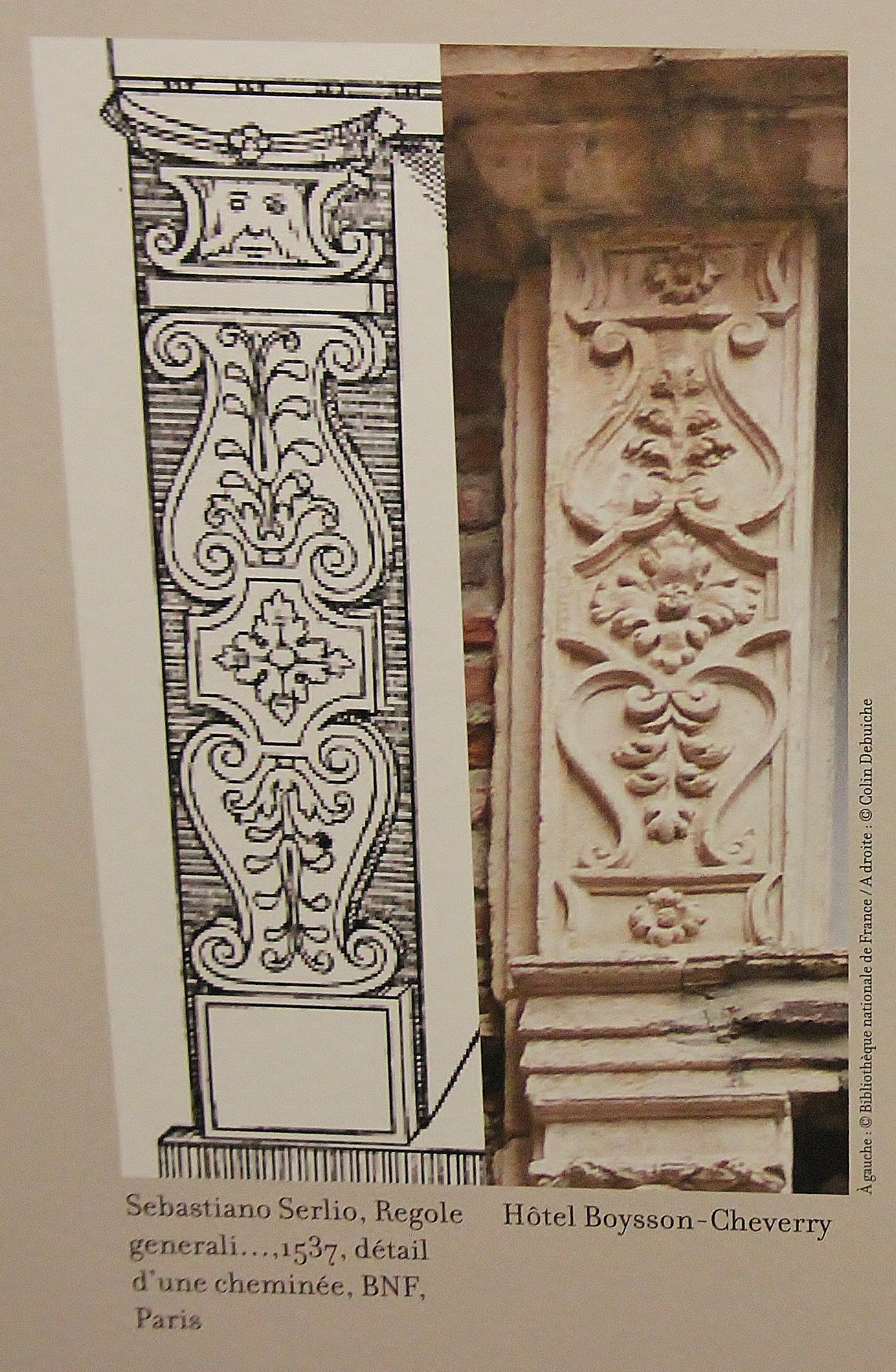
Part of the decoration of the previous window is derived from an illustration by Serlio.

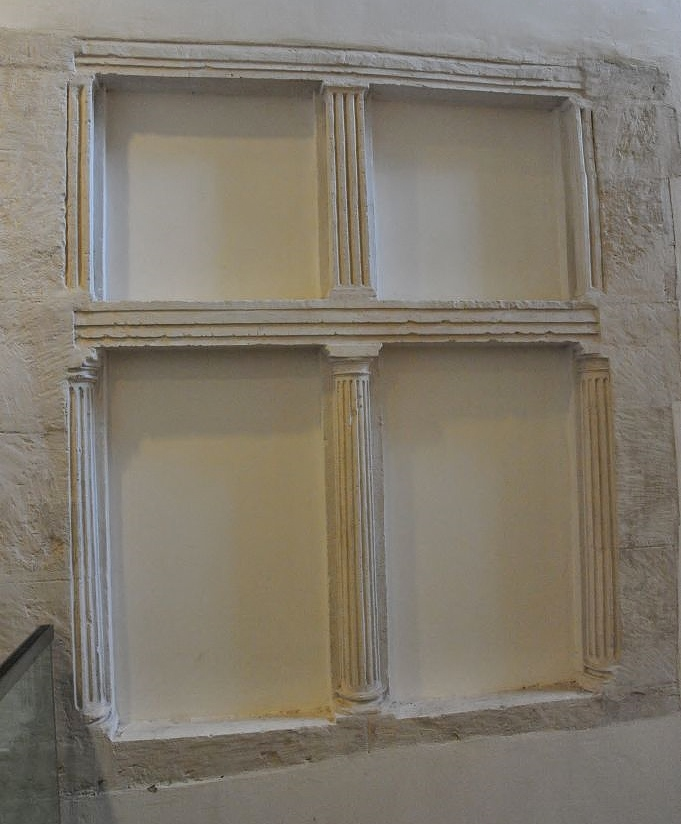
Hôtel Boysson-Cheverry (walled).

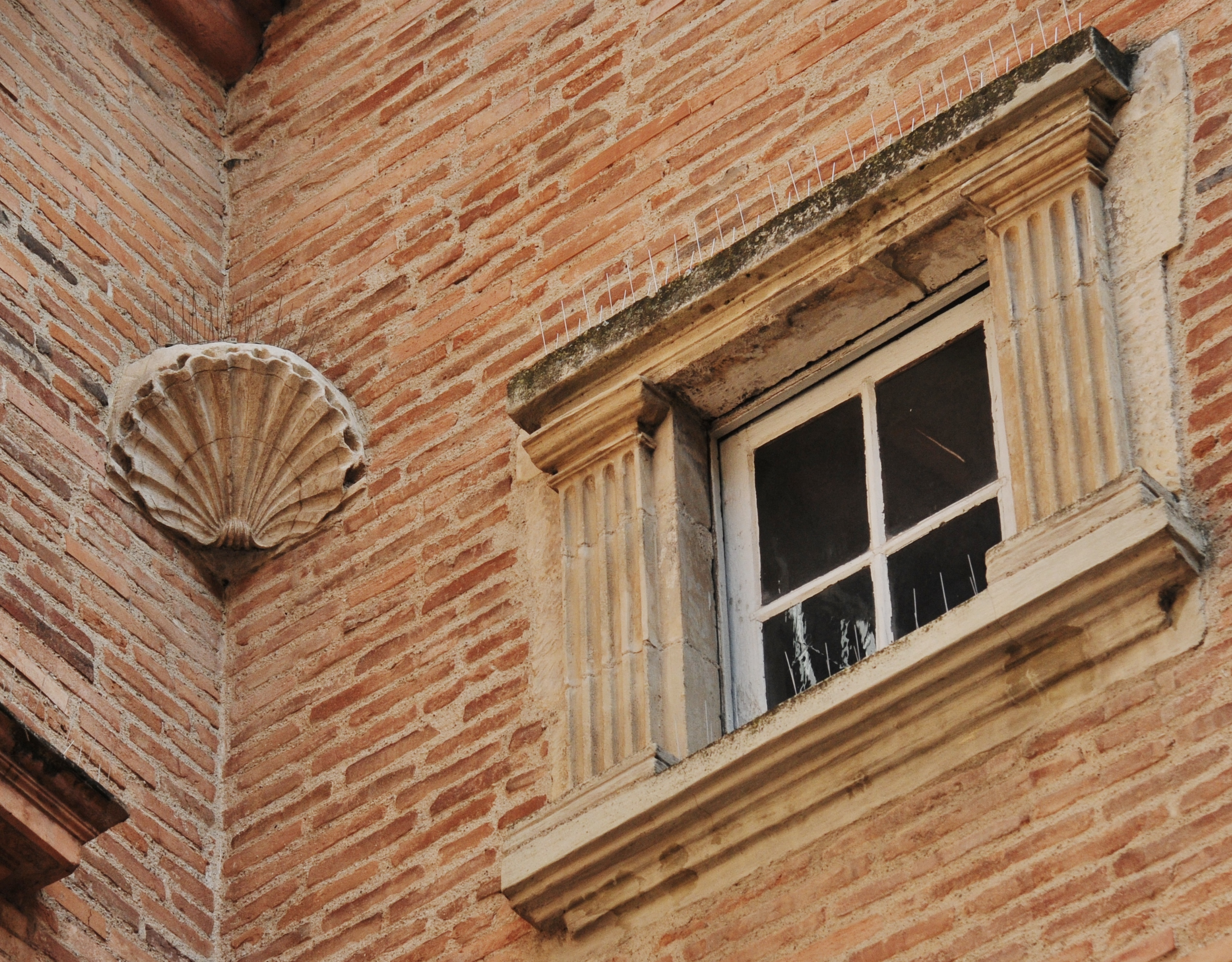
Hôtel de Lamamye.

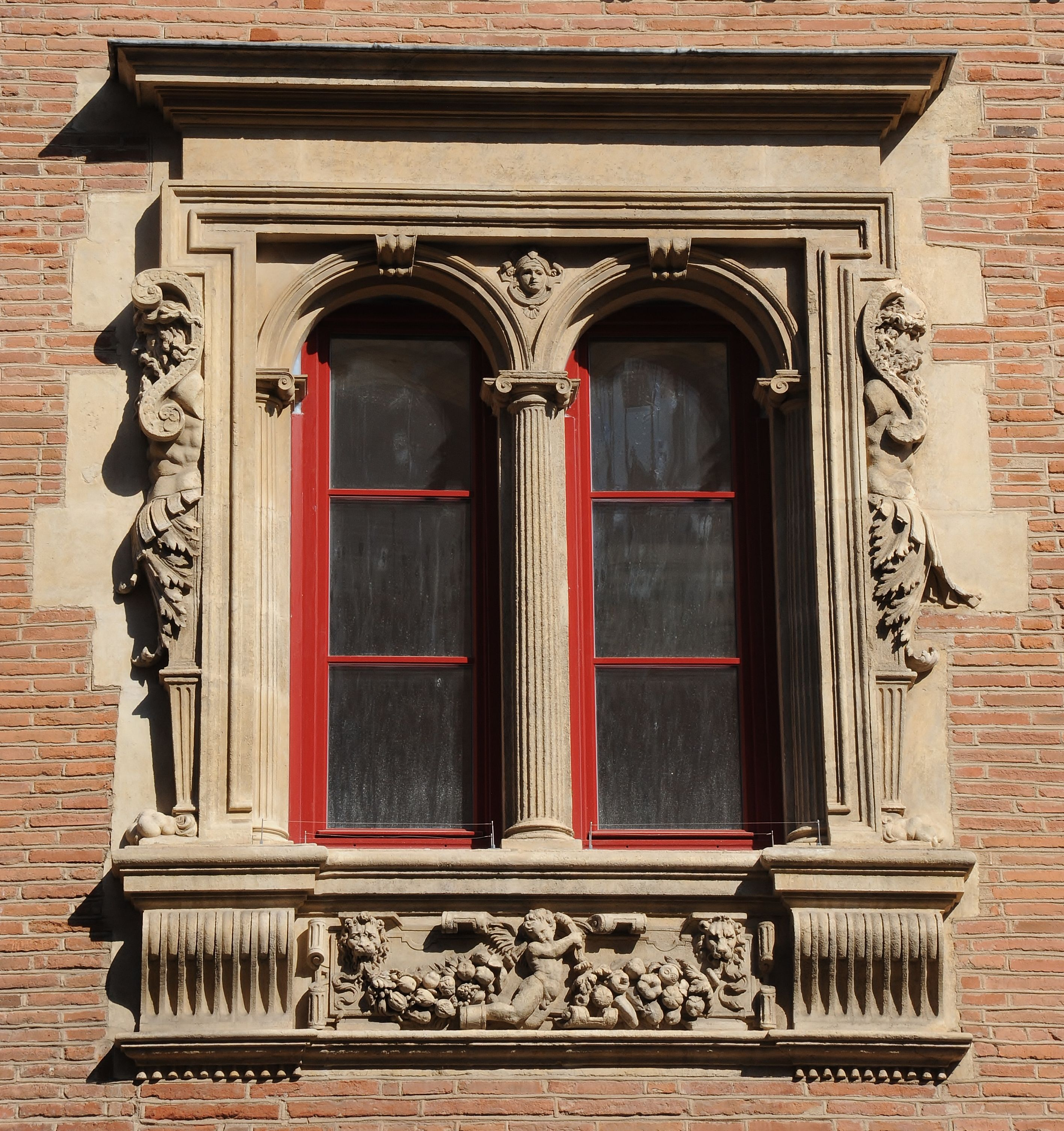
Hôtel du Vieux-Raisin.

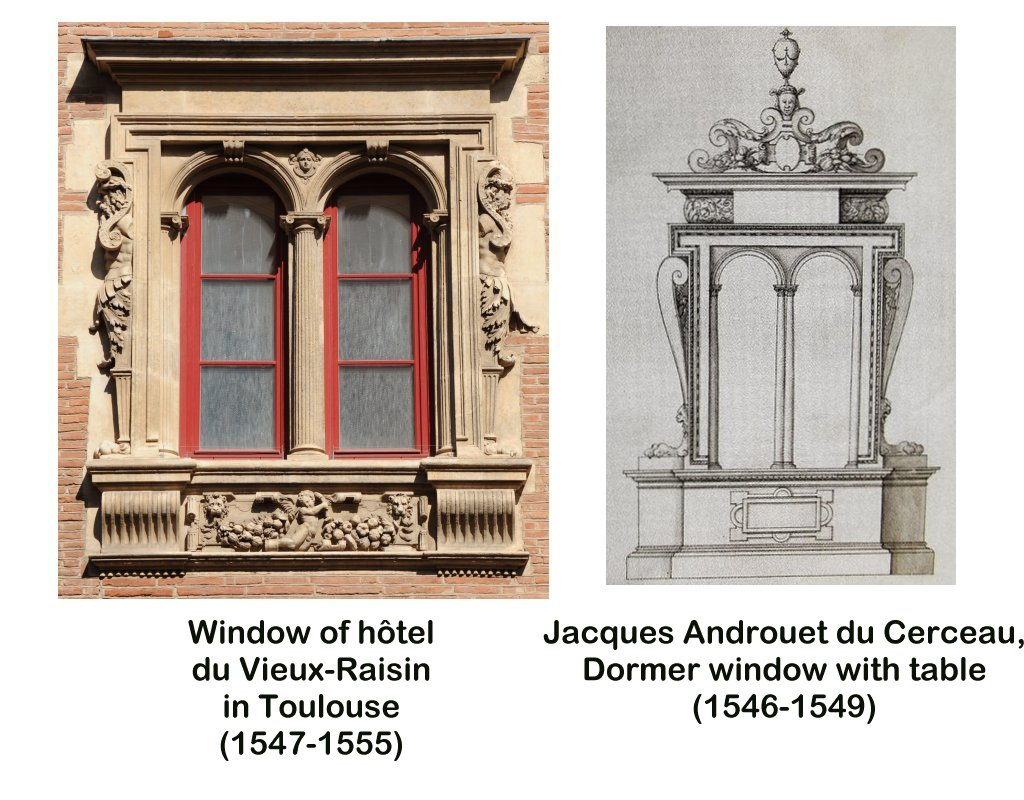
Influence of an engraving by Jacques Androuet du Cerceau on the window shown above.

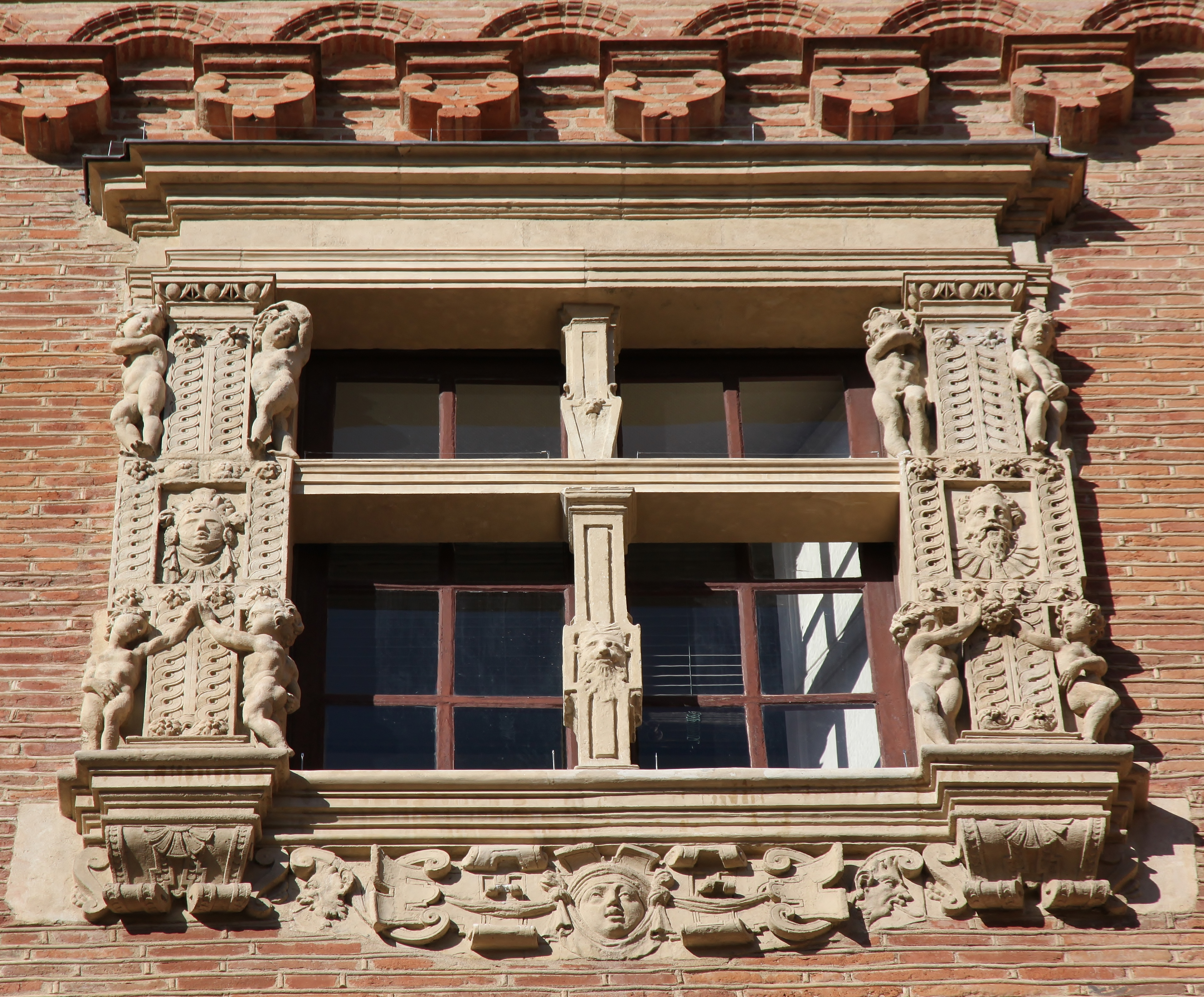
Hôtel du Vieux-Raisin.

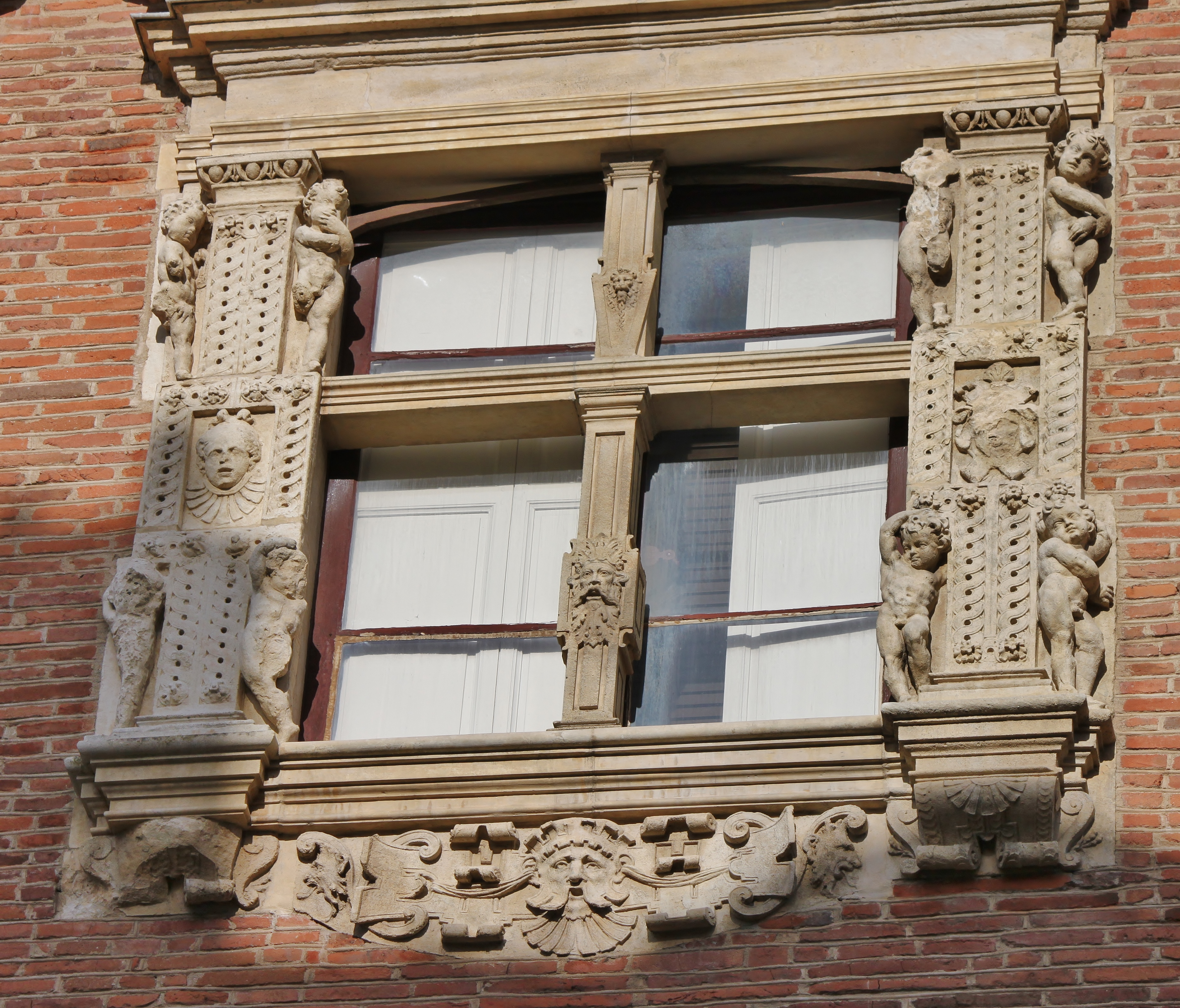
Hôtel du Vieux-Raisin.

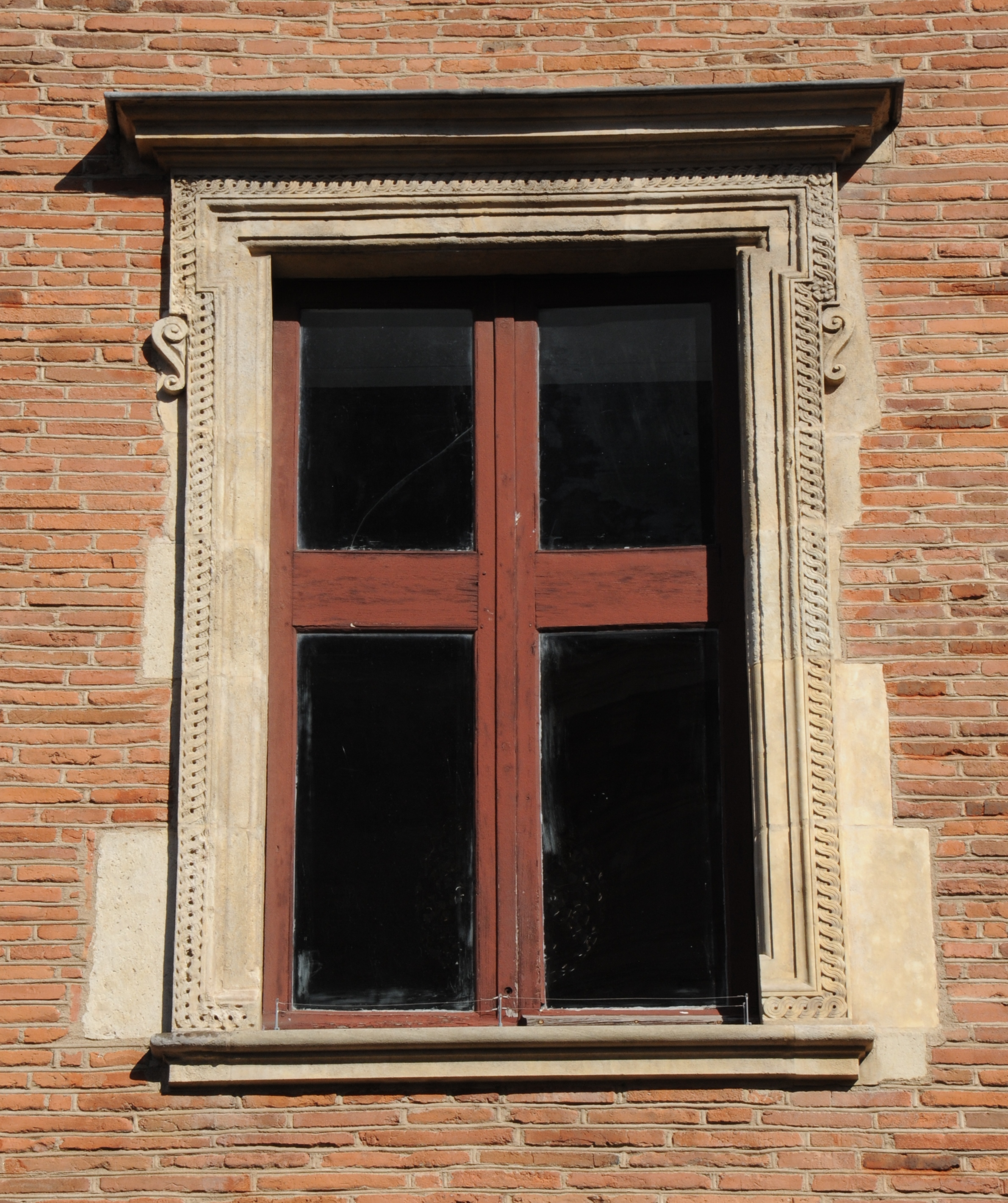
Hôtel du Vieux-Raisin.

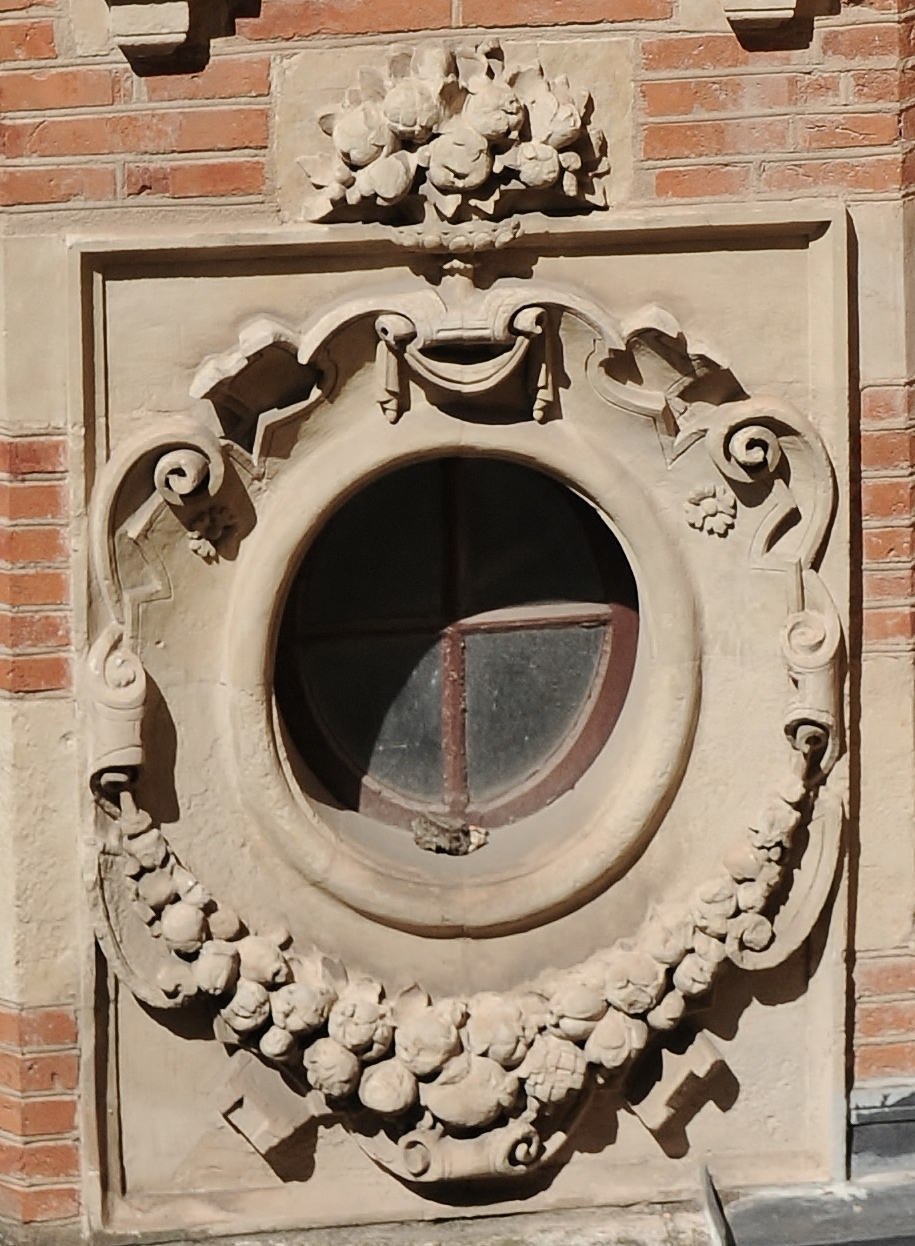
Hôtel du Vieux-Raisin.

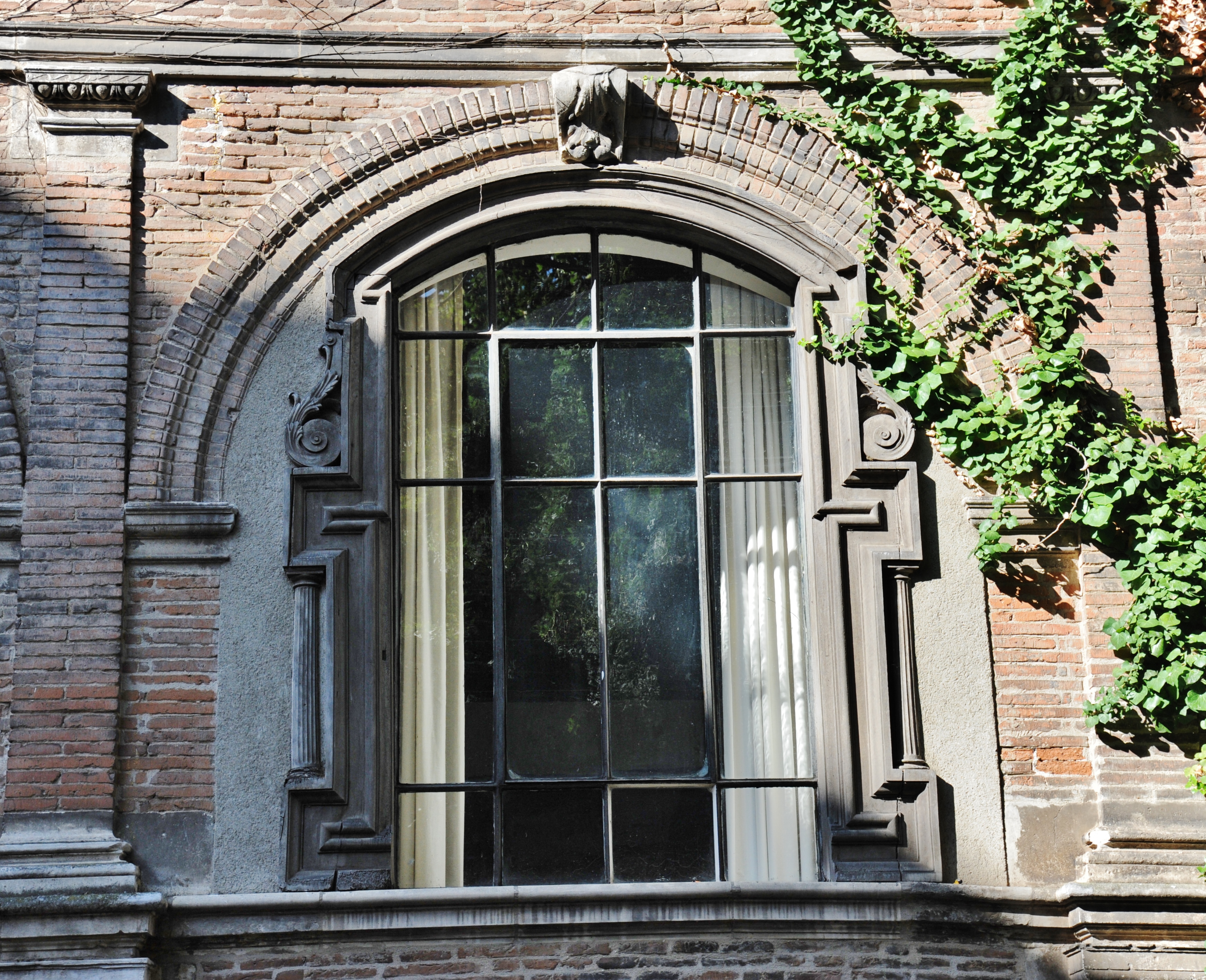
Hôtel de Mansencal, ground floor.

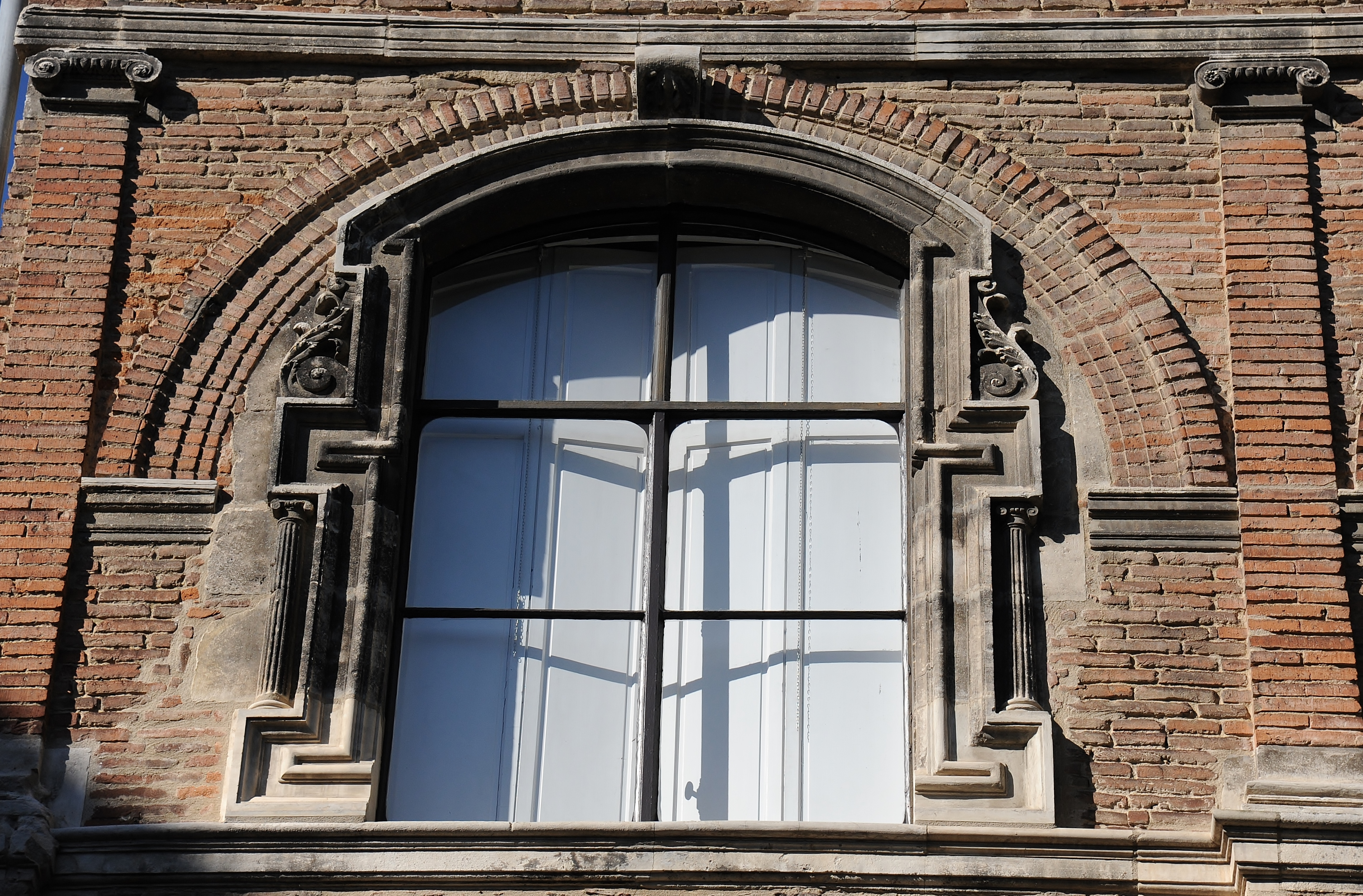
Hôtel de Mansencal, first floor.

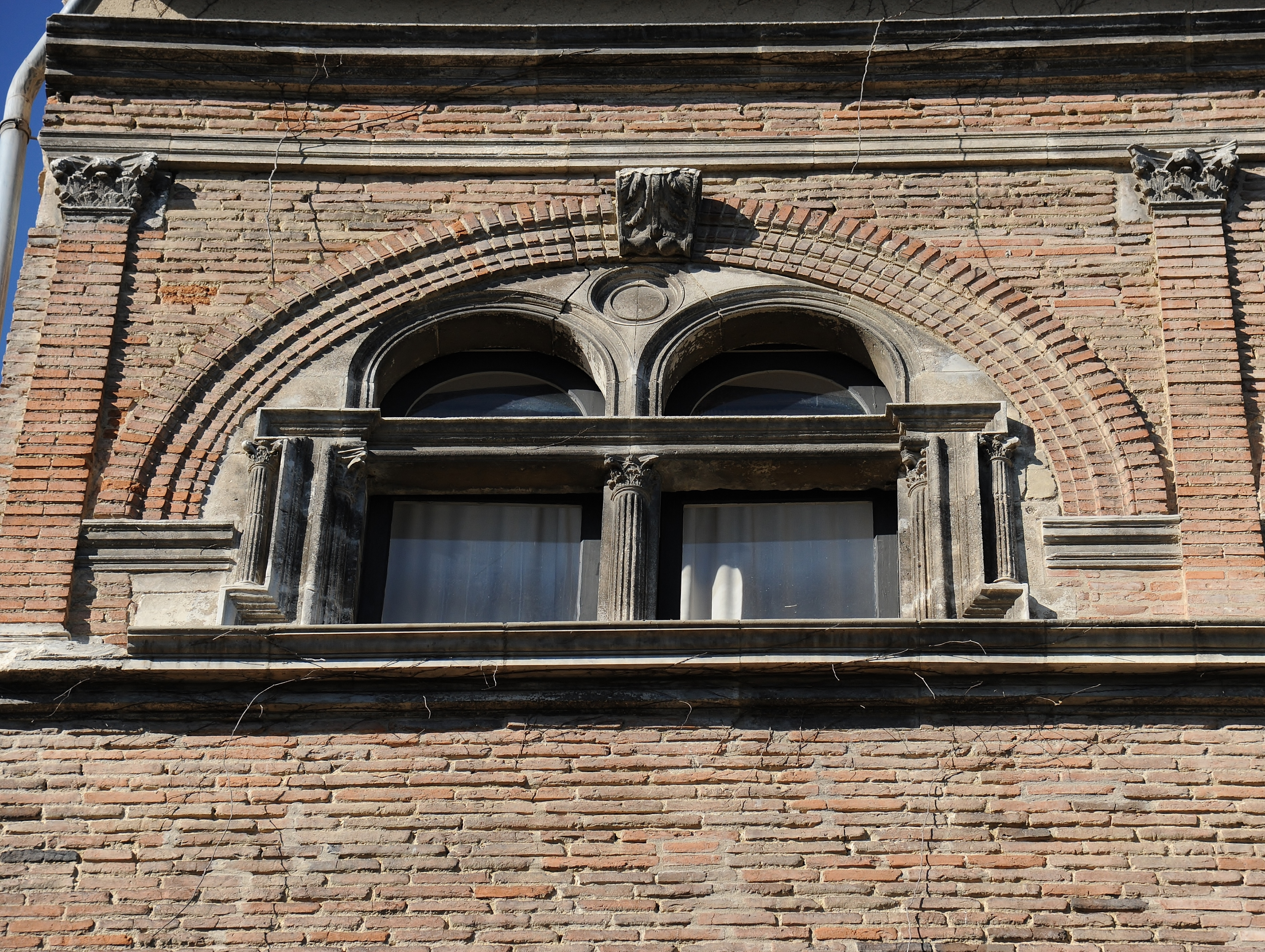
Hôtel de Mansencal, second floor.

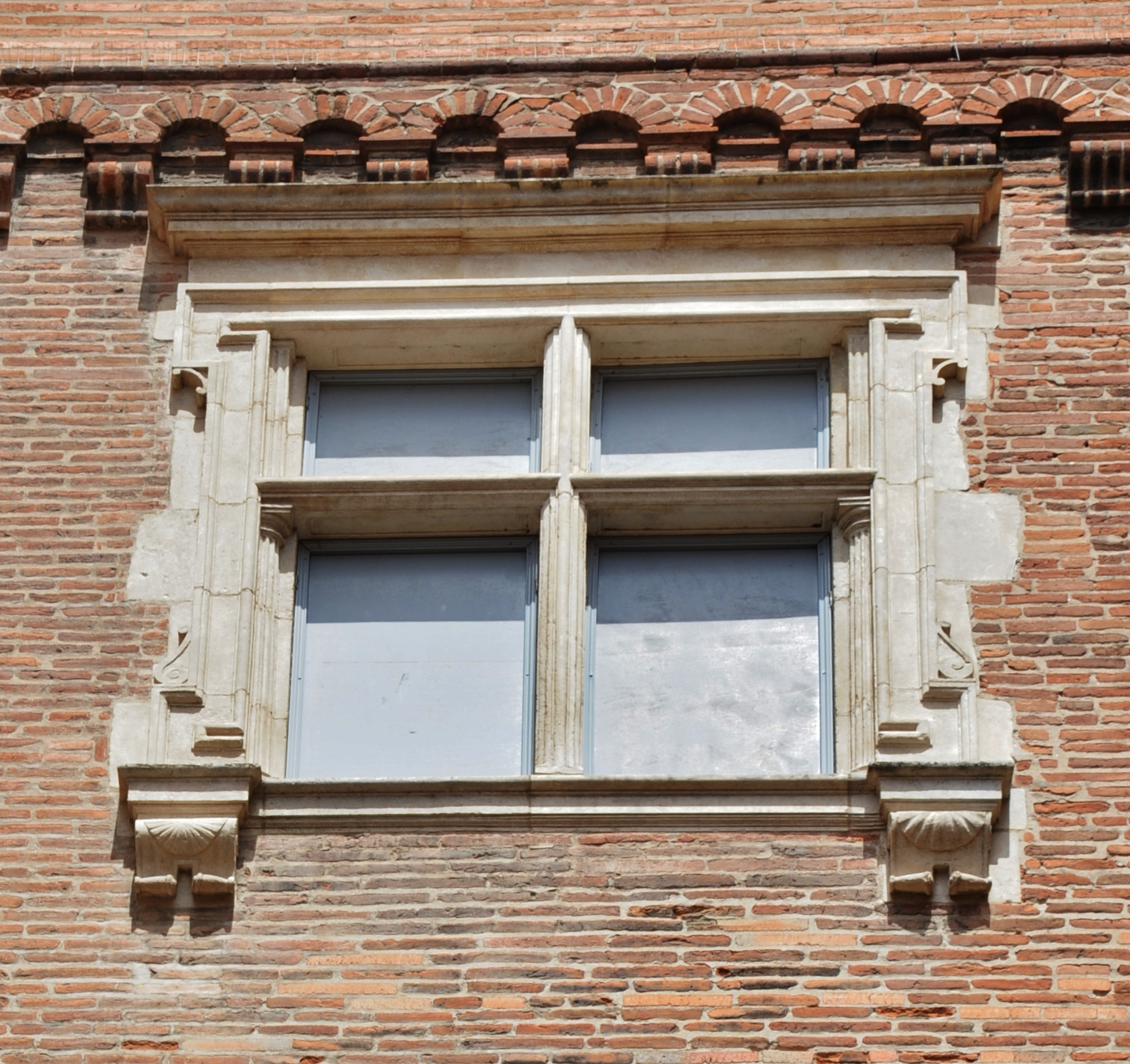
Hôtel de Mansencal (courtyard).

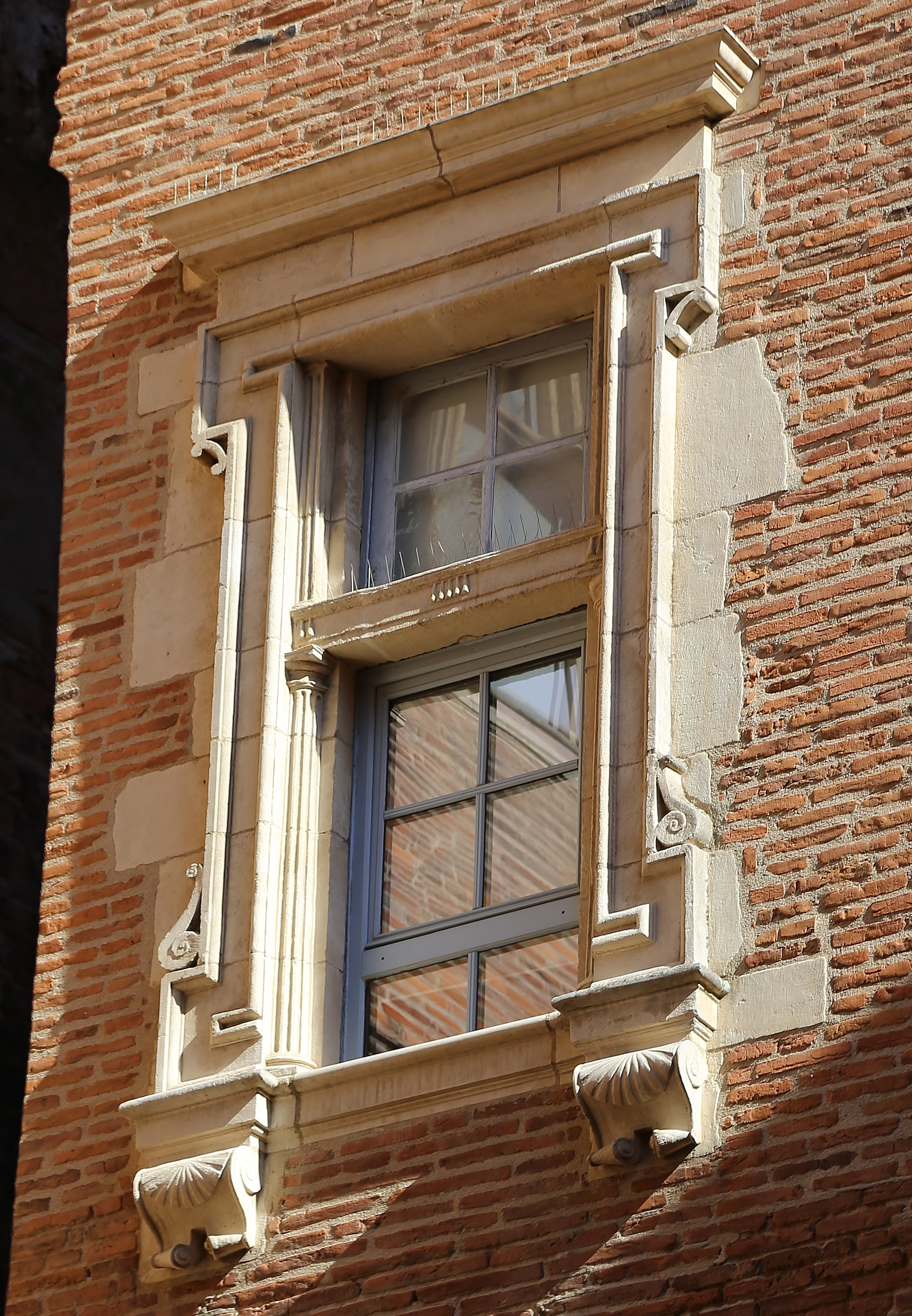
Hôtel de Mansencal (courtyard).

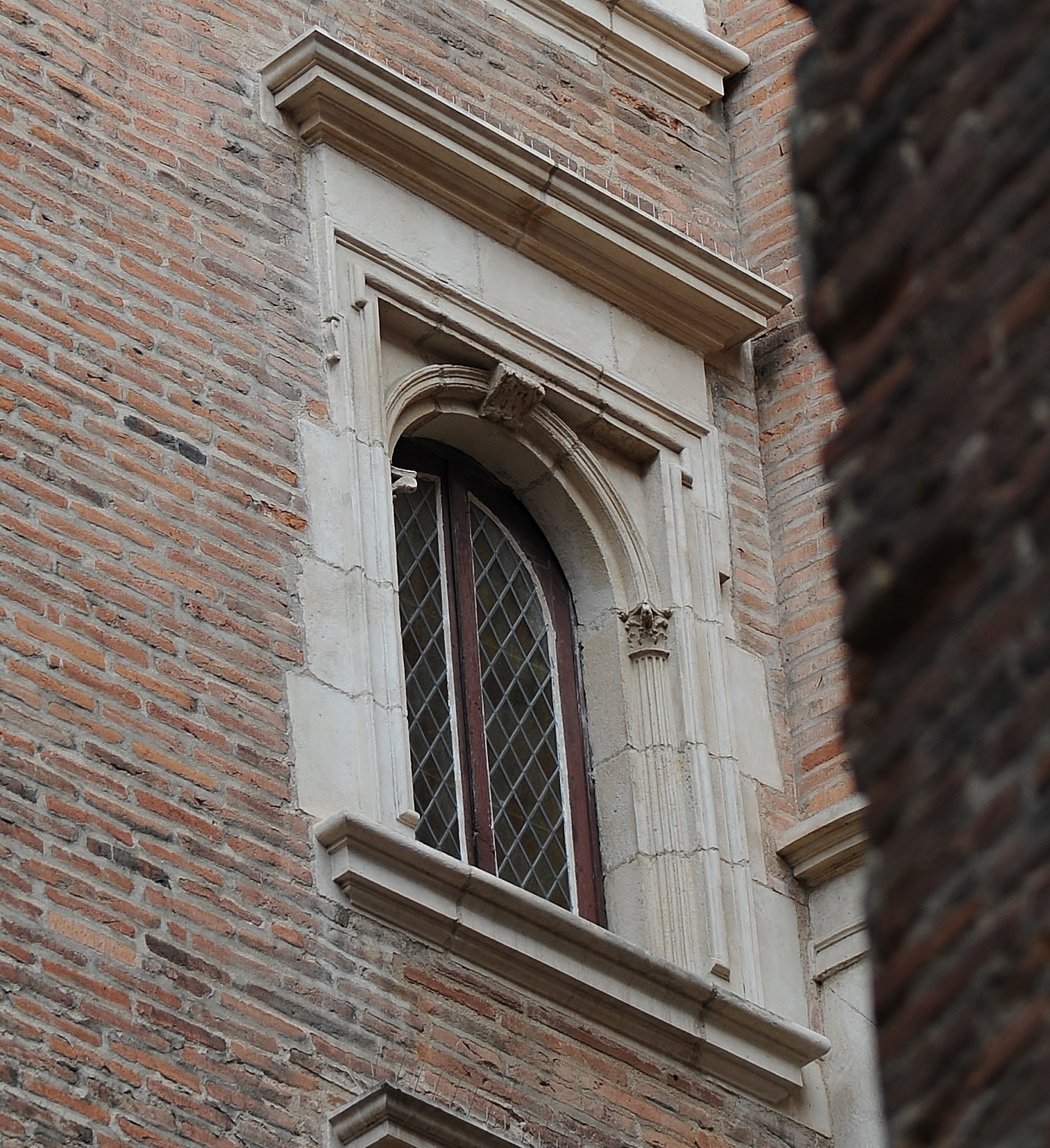
Hôtel de Mansencal (tower).

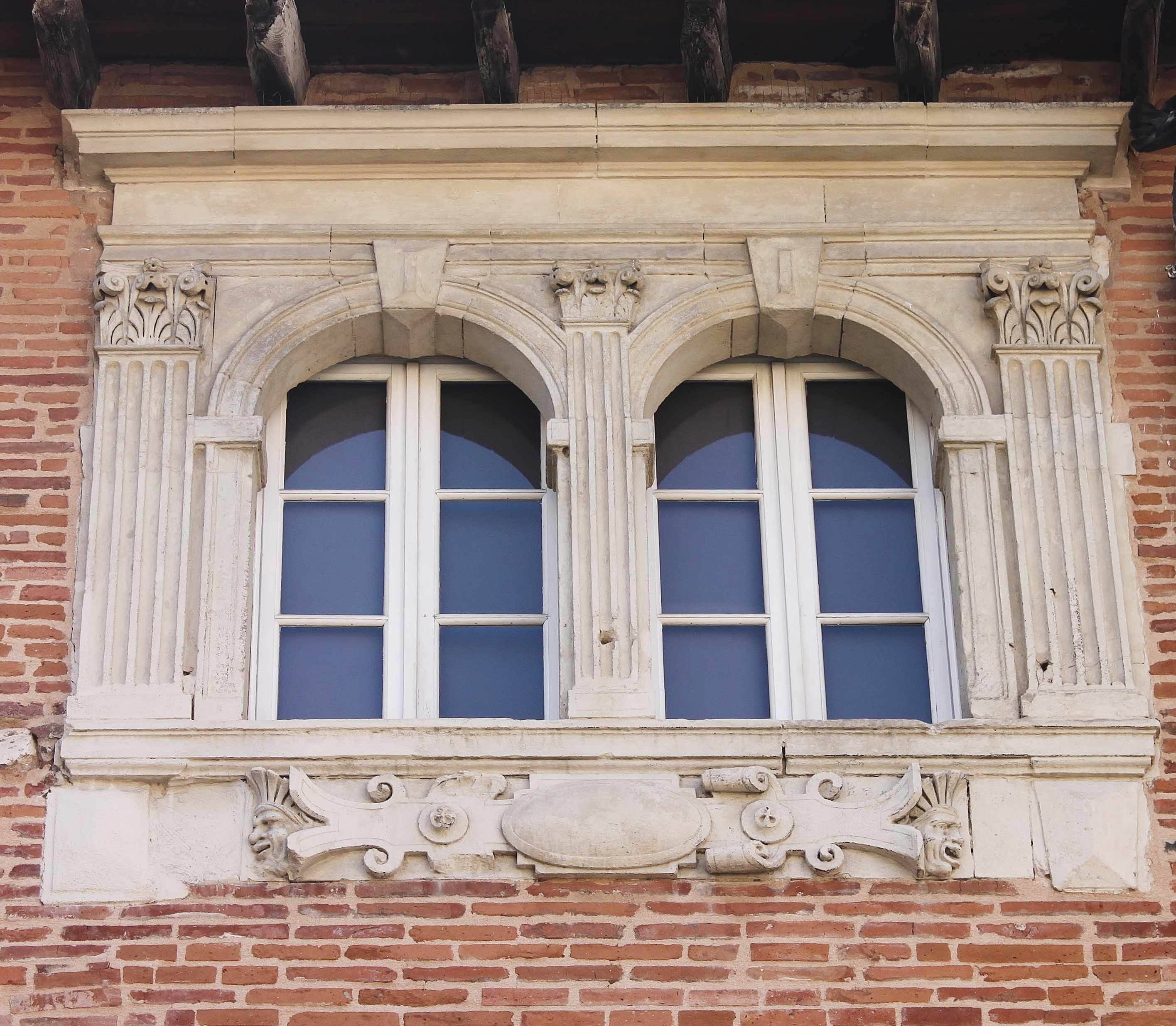
House of Auger Ferrier, with representation of Amerindian heads.

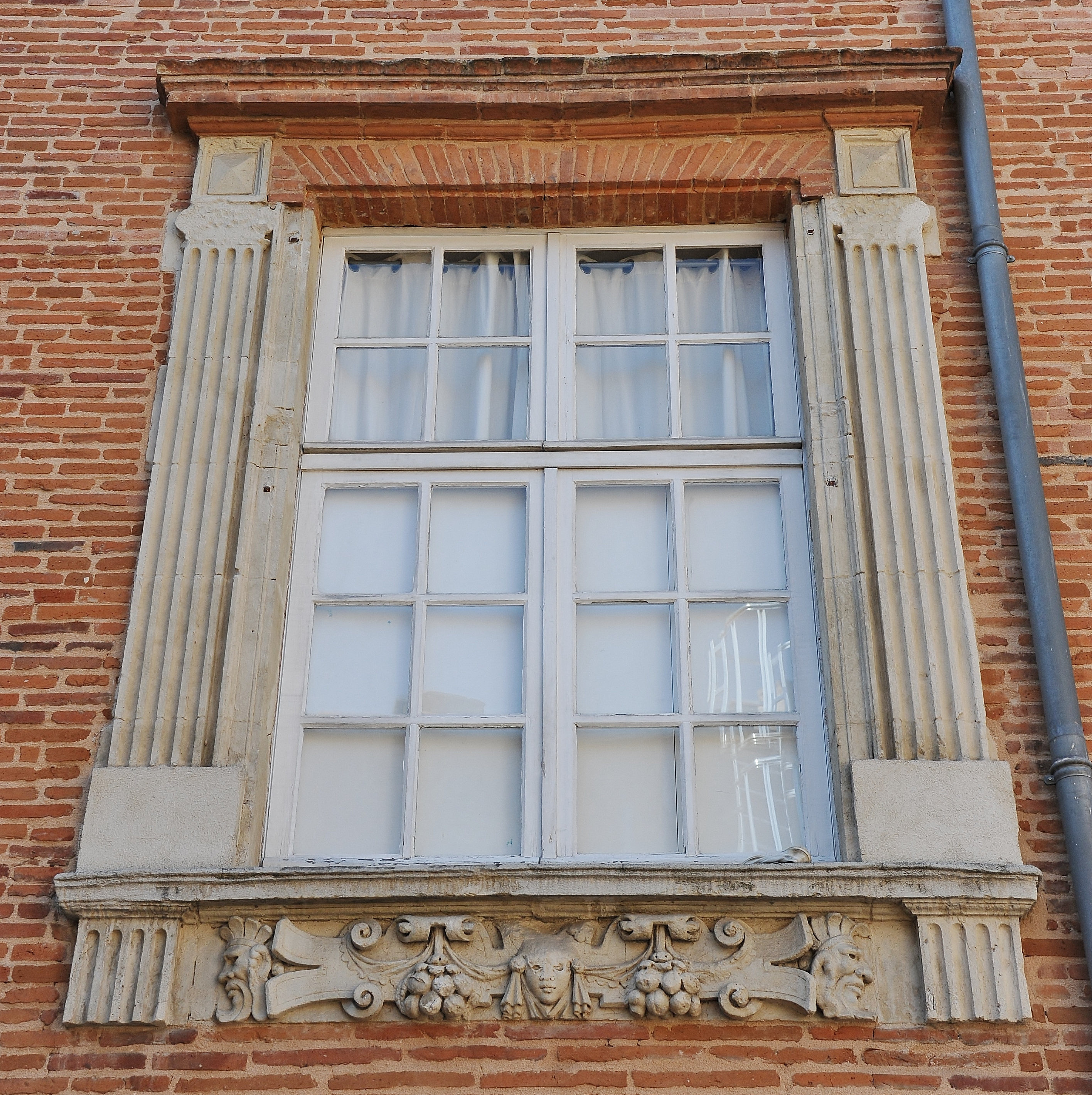
House of Auger Ferrier.

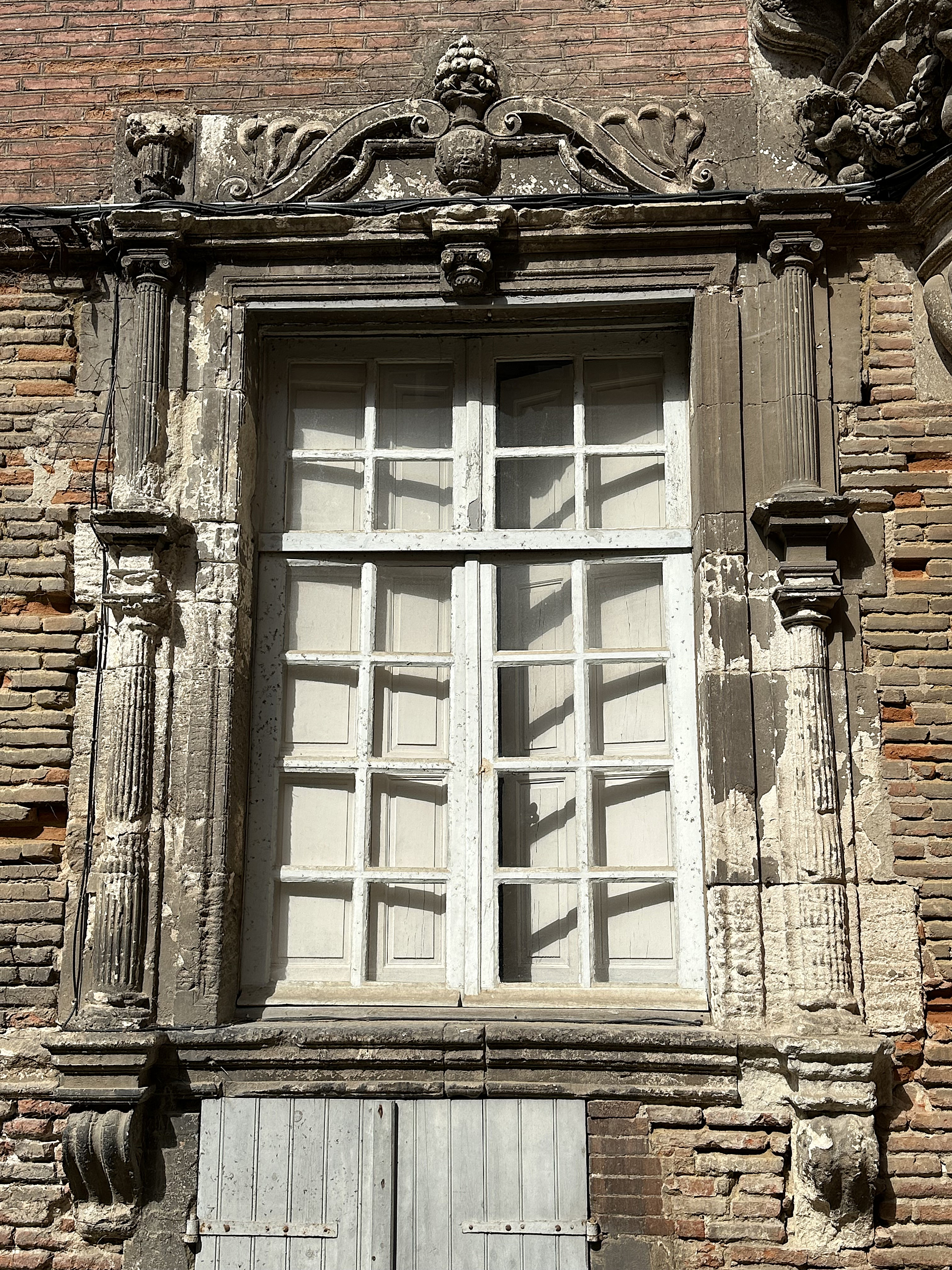
Hôtel Molinier.

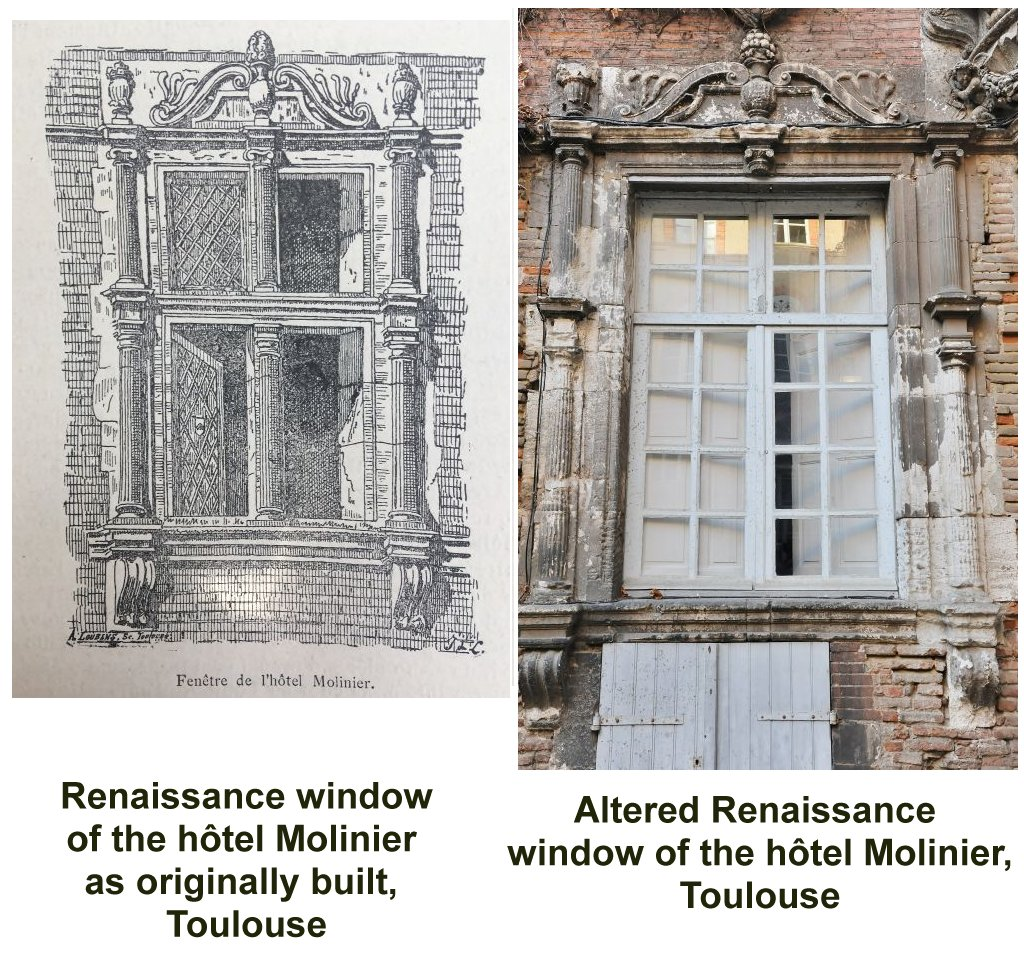
Hôtel Molinier, alteration of a window

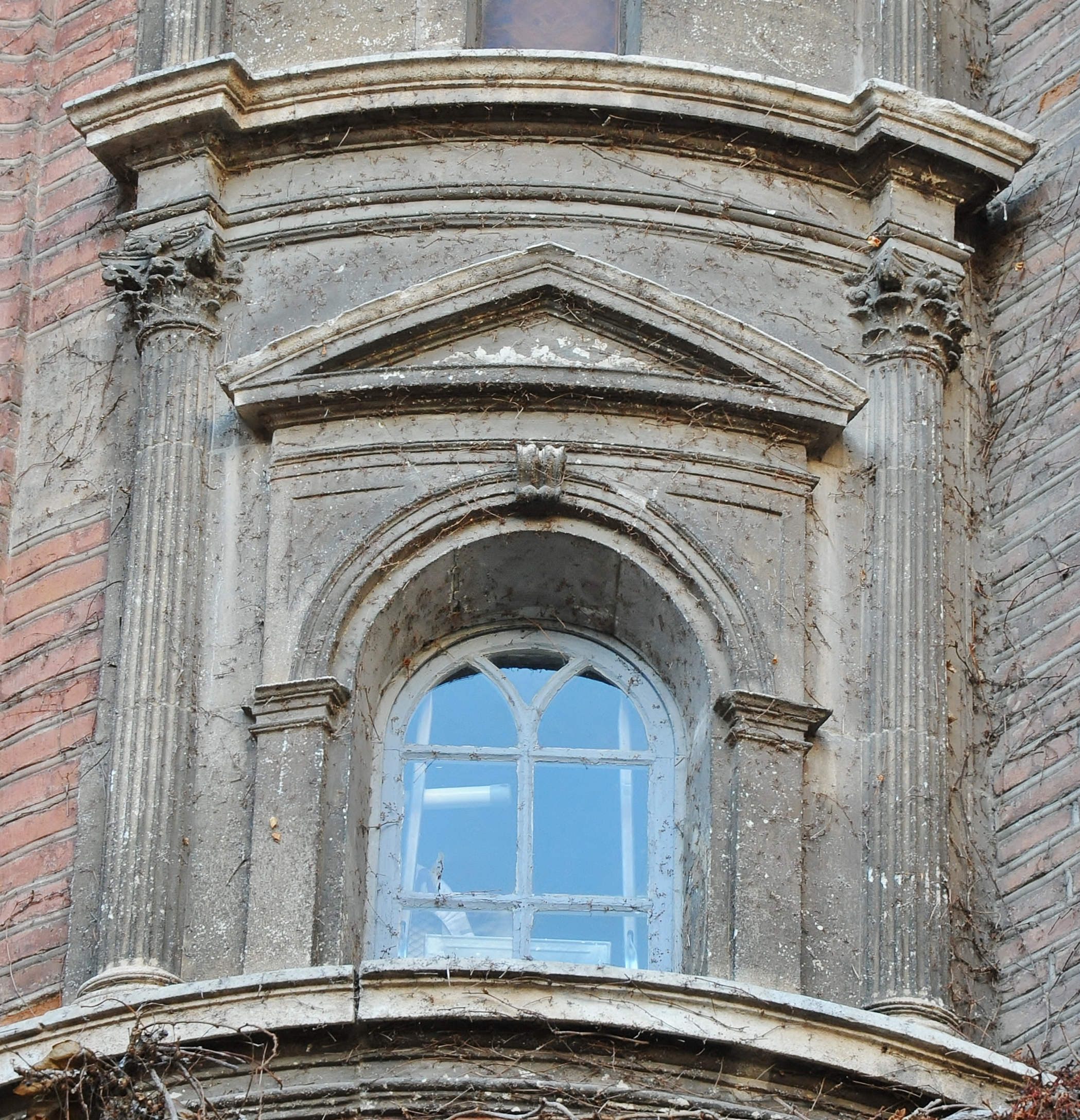
Hôtel Molinier.

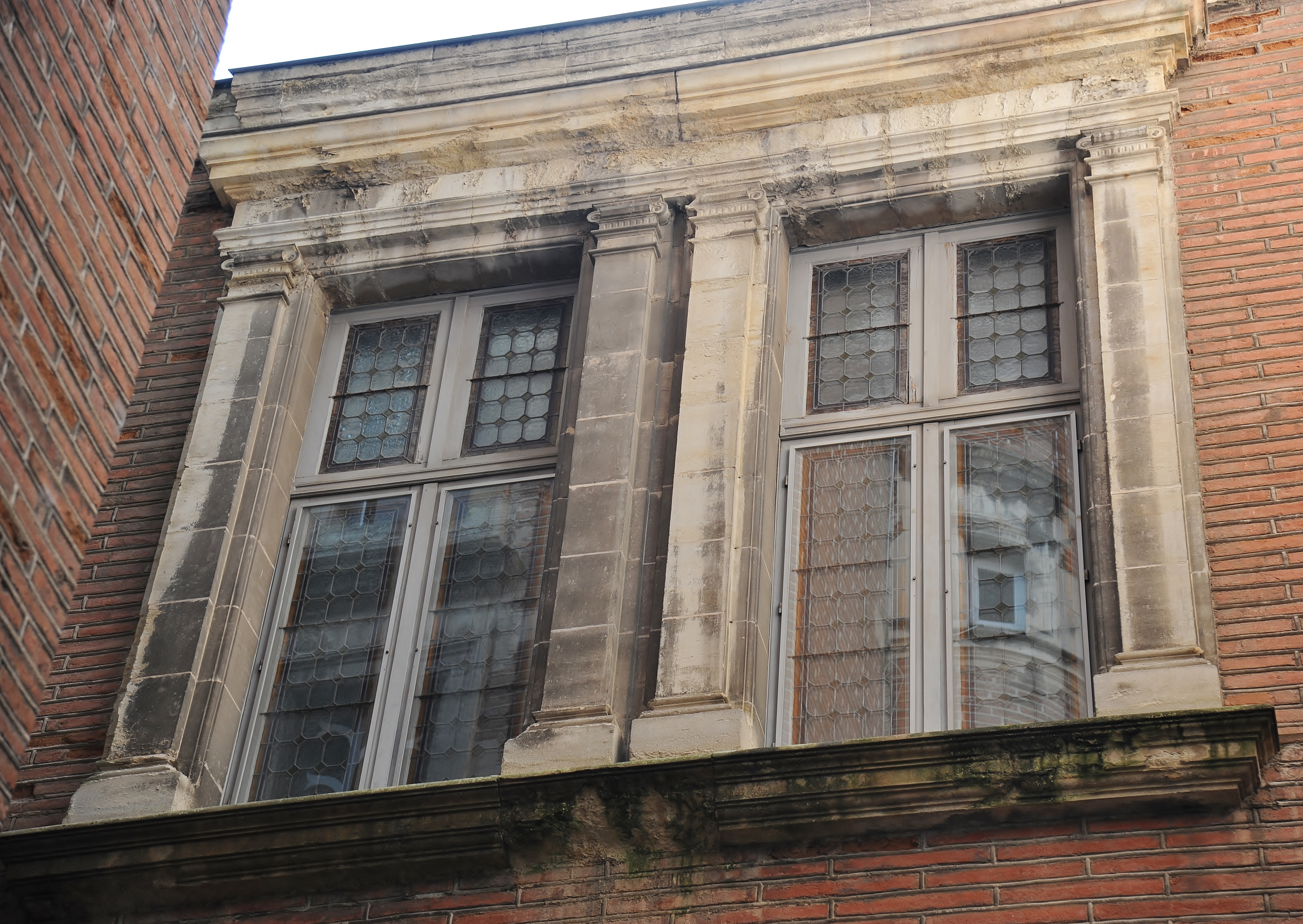
Hôtel Molinier.

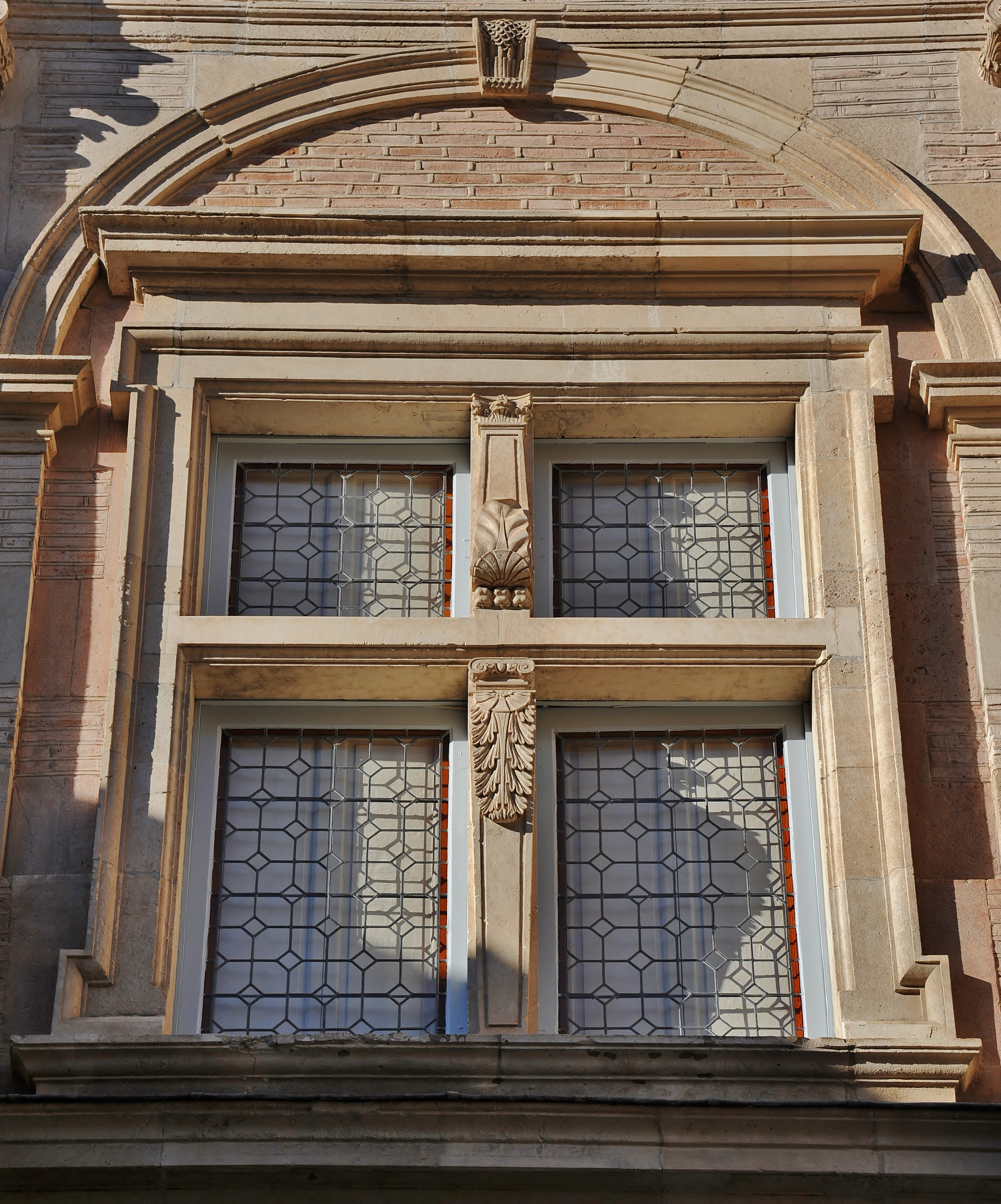
Hôtel d'Assézat.

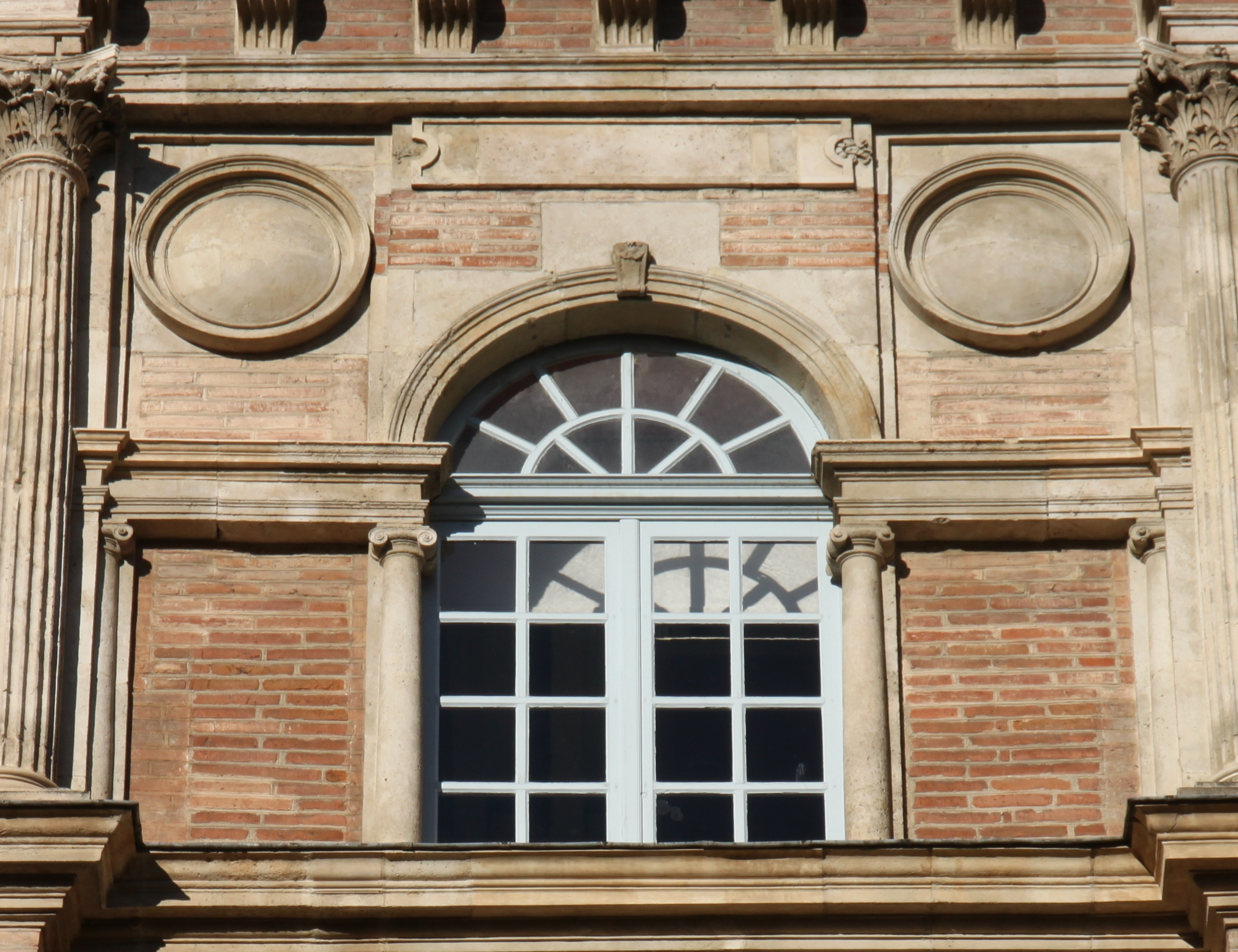
Hôtel d'Assézat, serlian window.

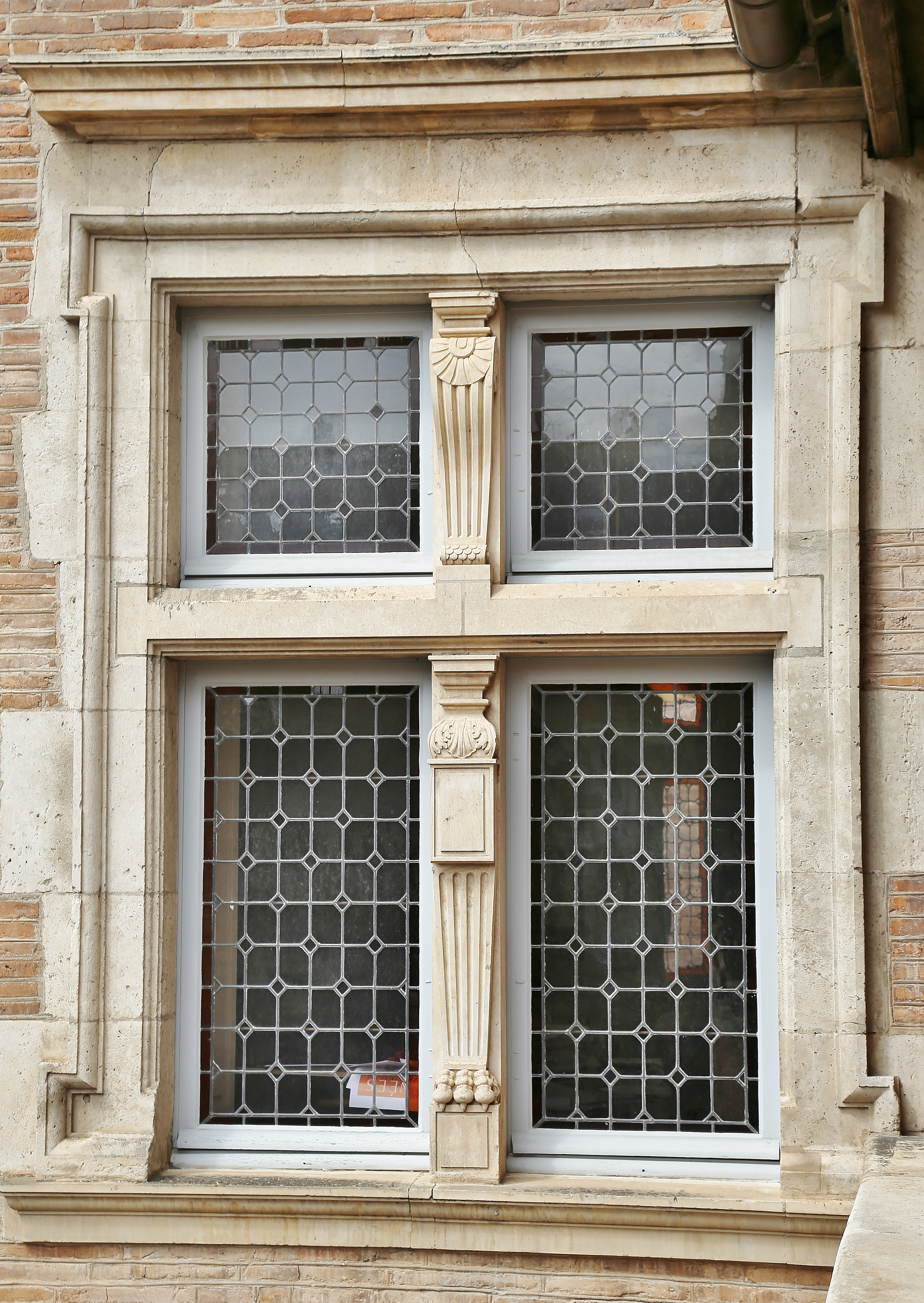
Hôtel d'Assézat.

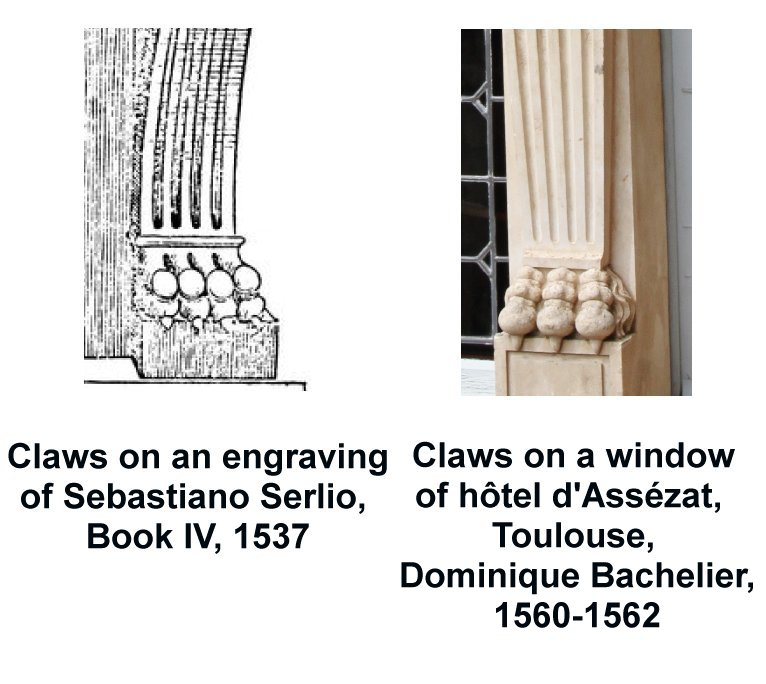
Hôtel d'Assézat, detail of the previous window.

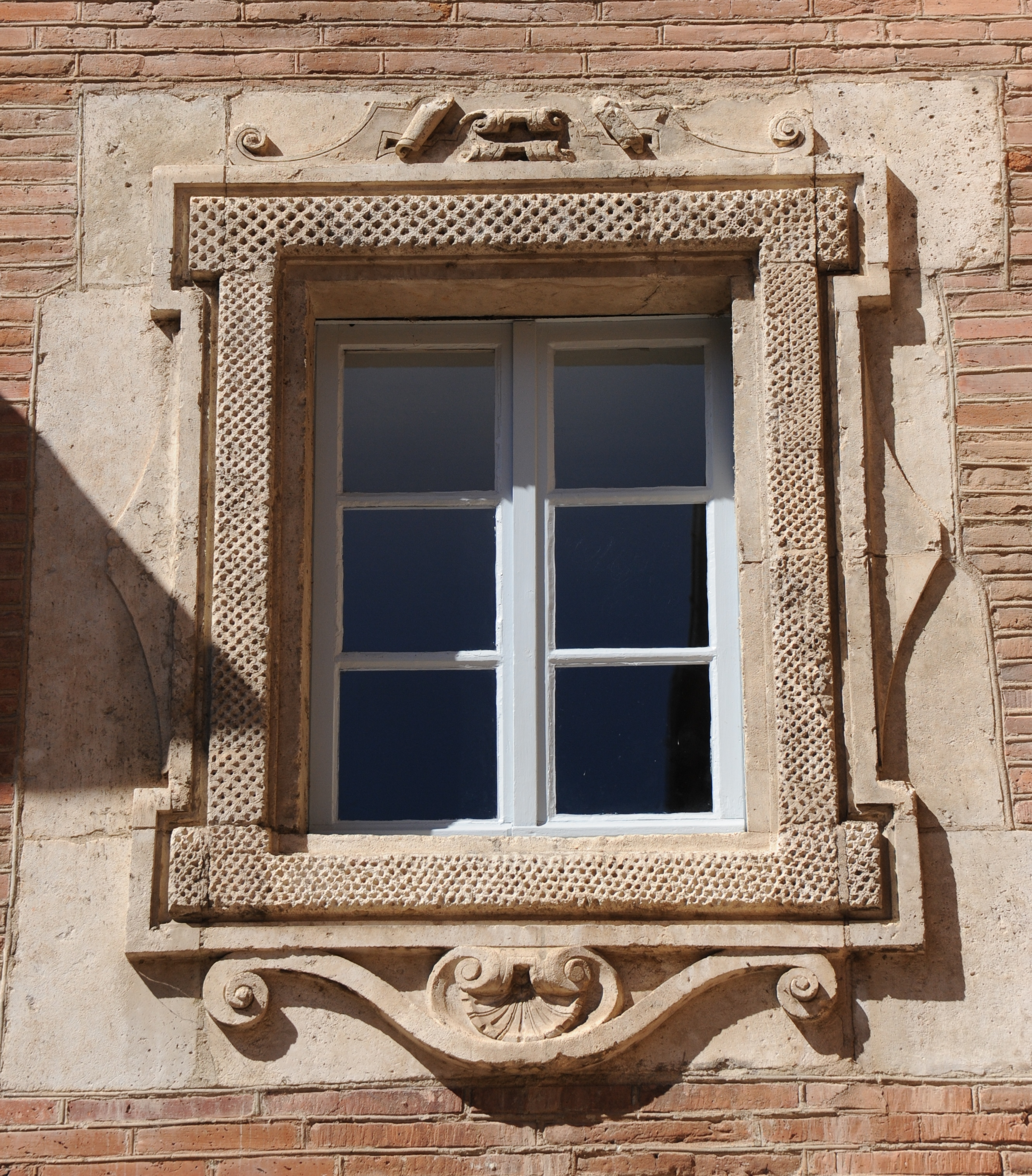
Hôtel d'Assézat.

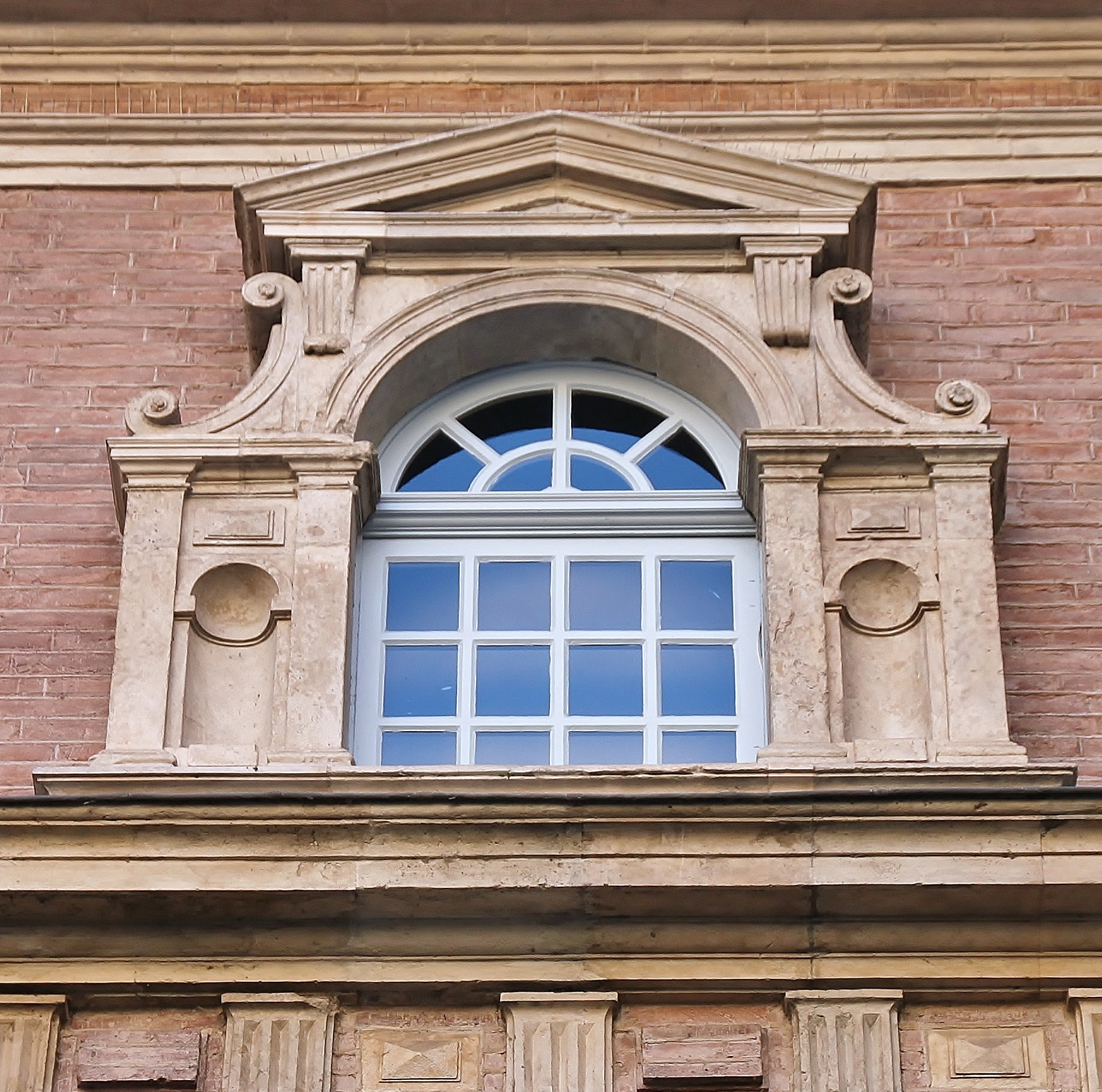
Hôtel d'Assézat.

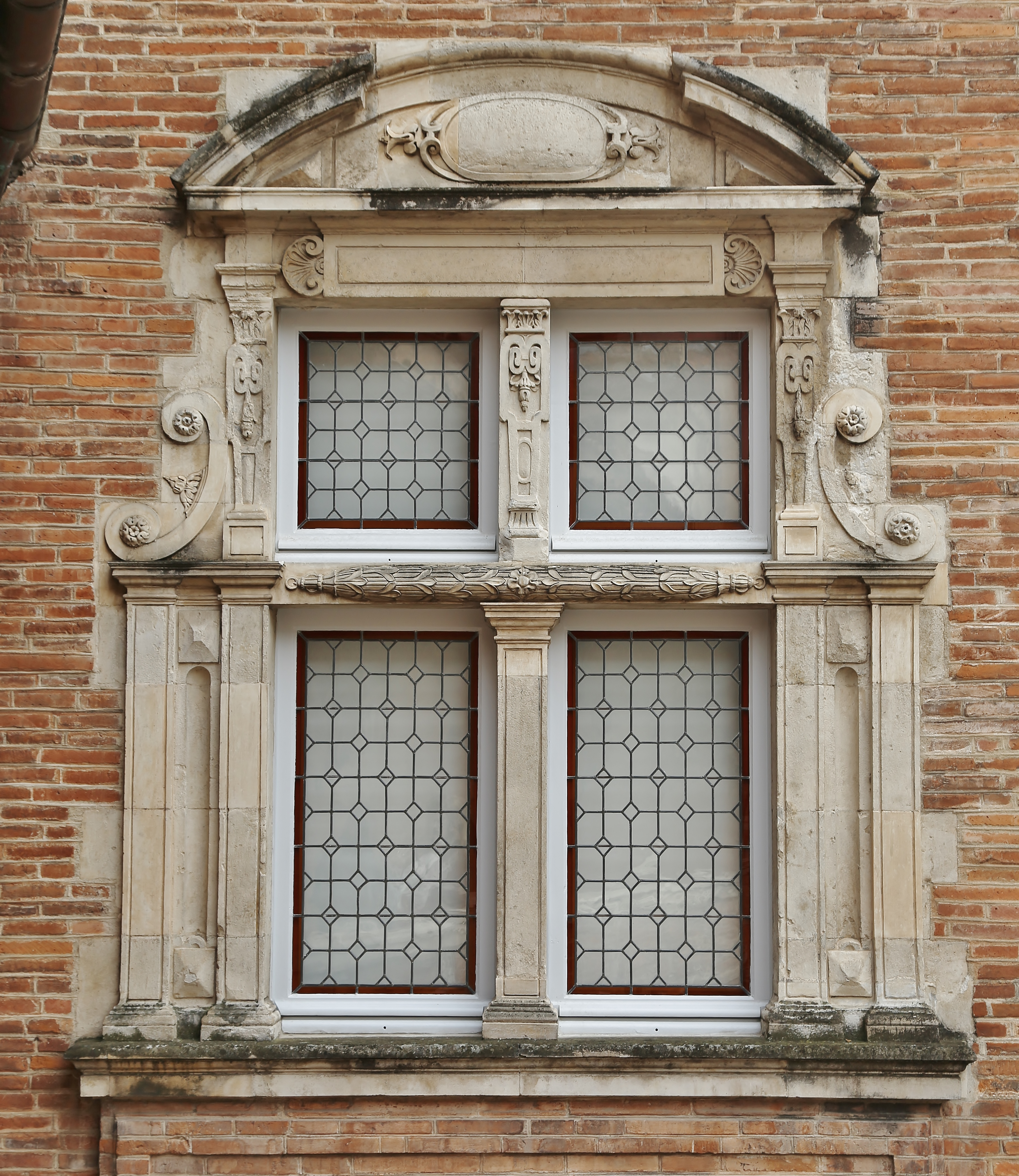
Hôtel d'Assézat (merchant's office on the courtyard).

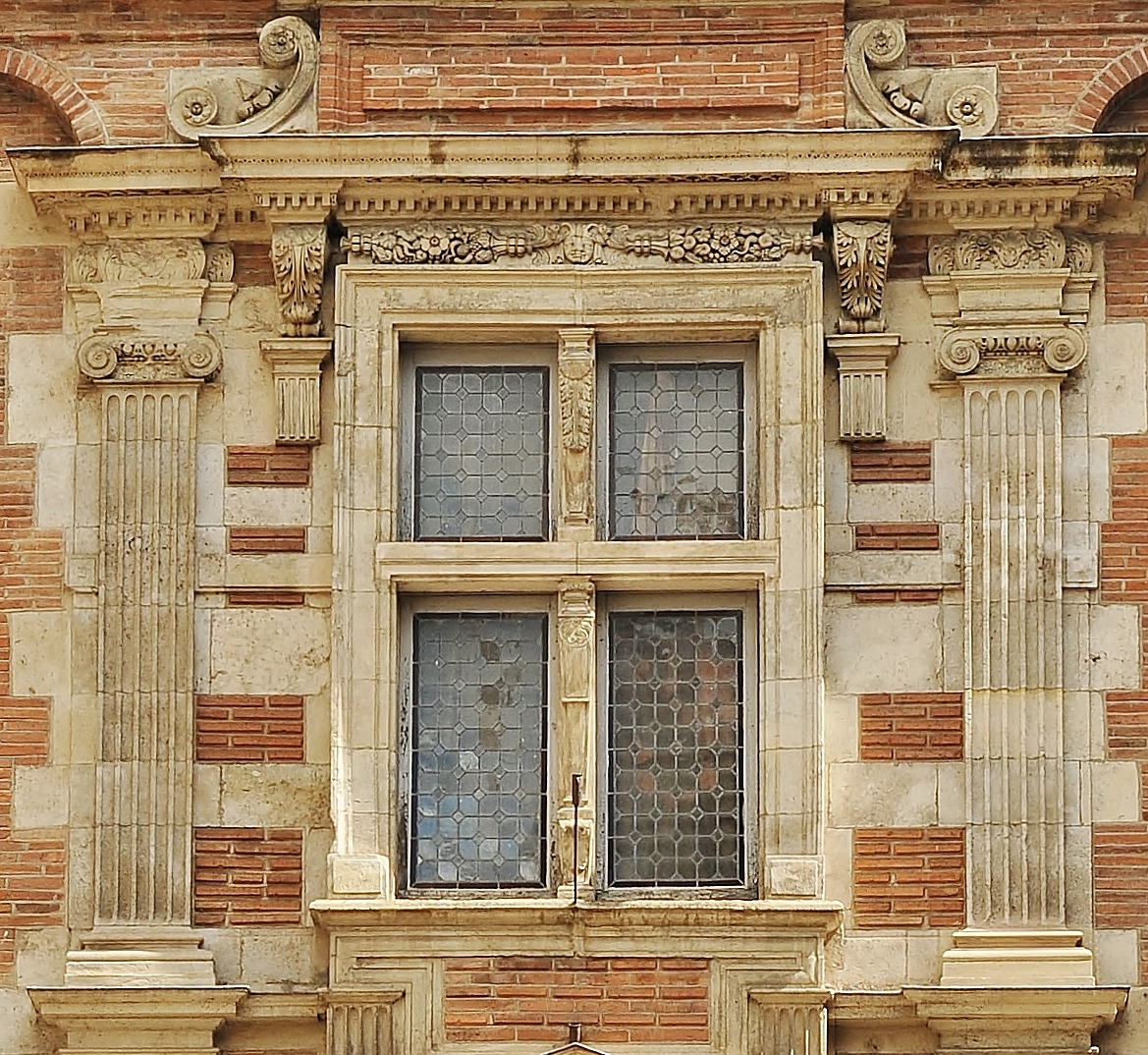
Hôtel d'Assézat (merchant's office on the street).

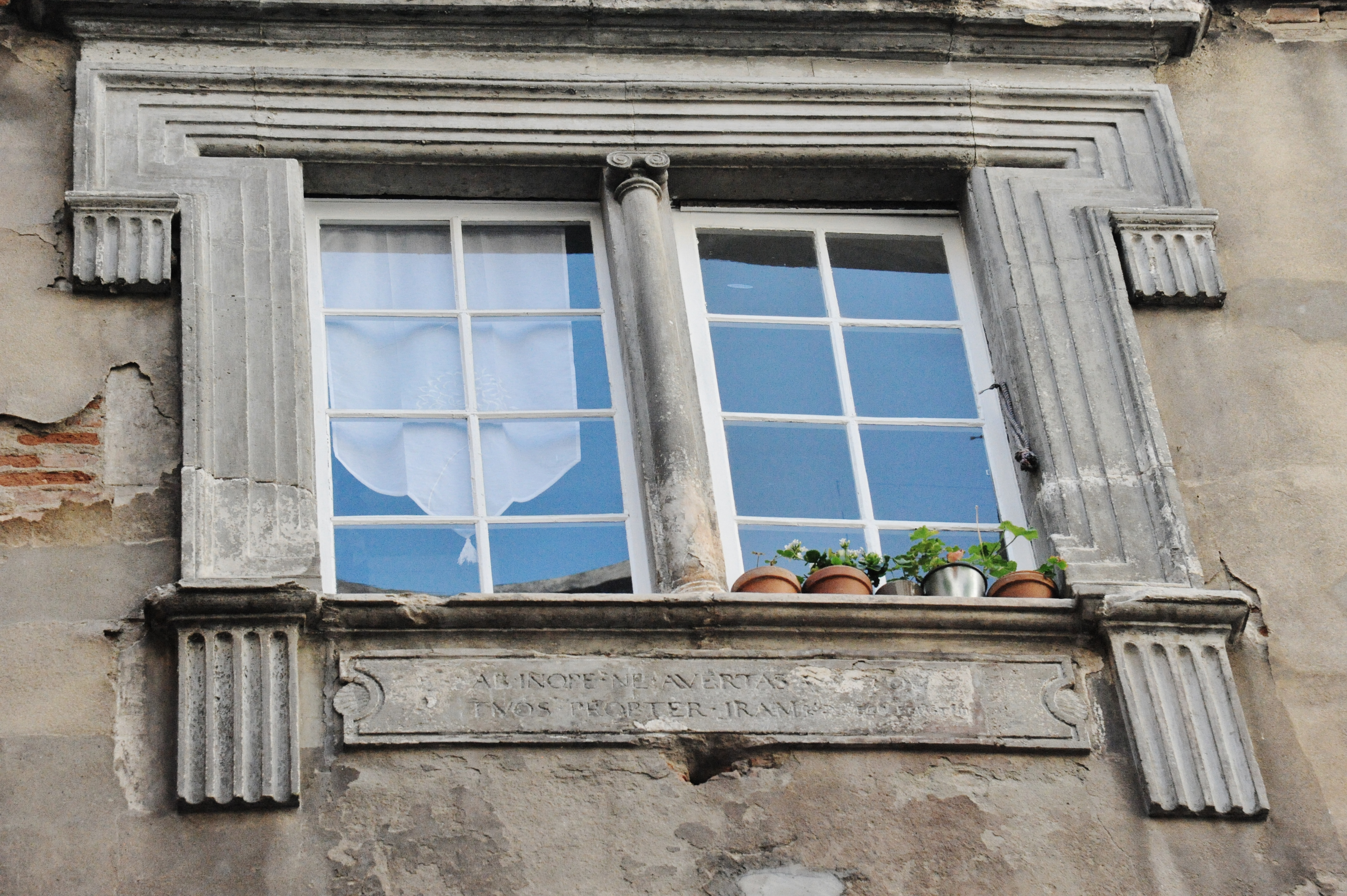
Hôtel Delpech, with Latin quotations from the Bible.

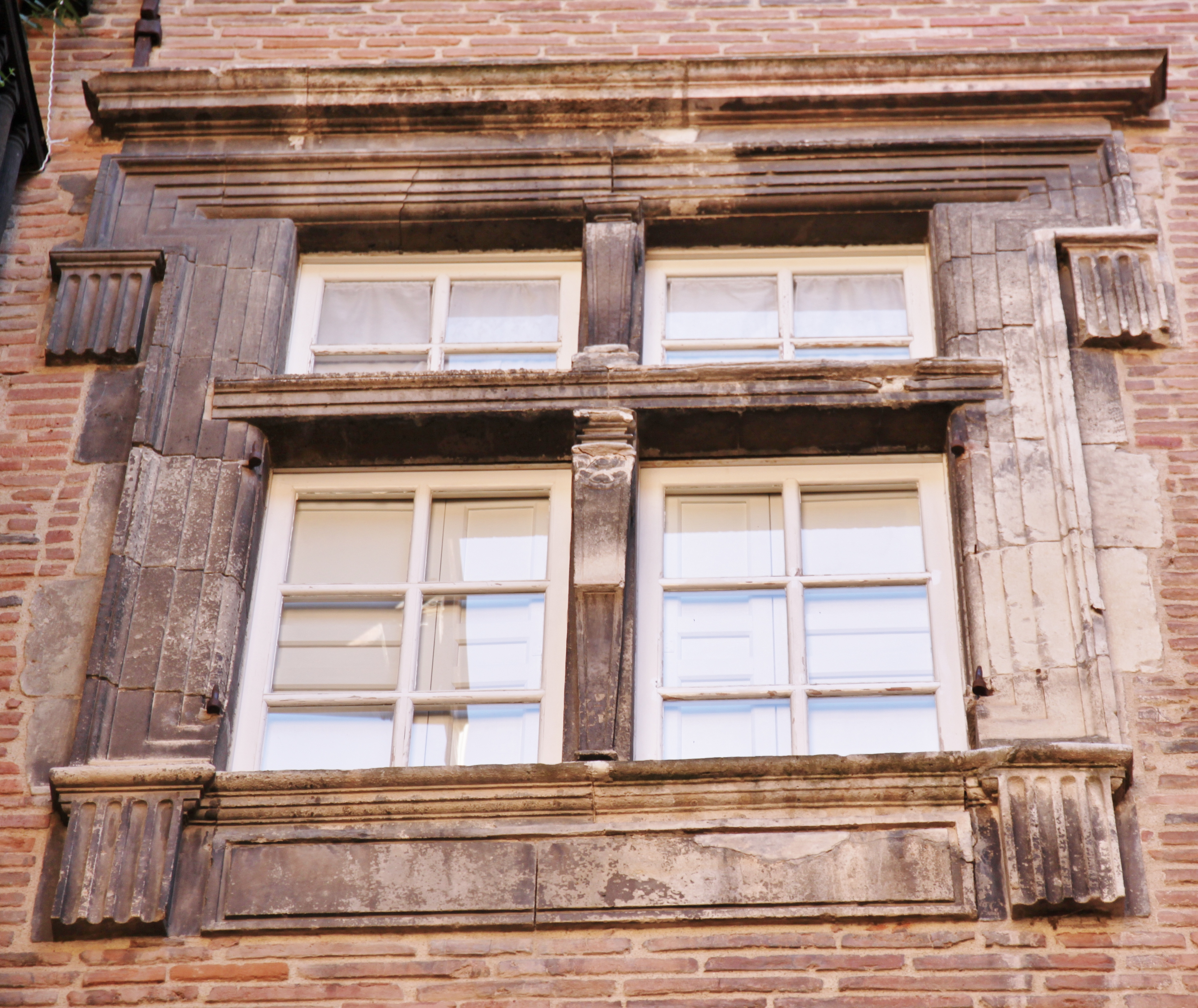
Hôtel d'Astorg (courtyard).

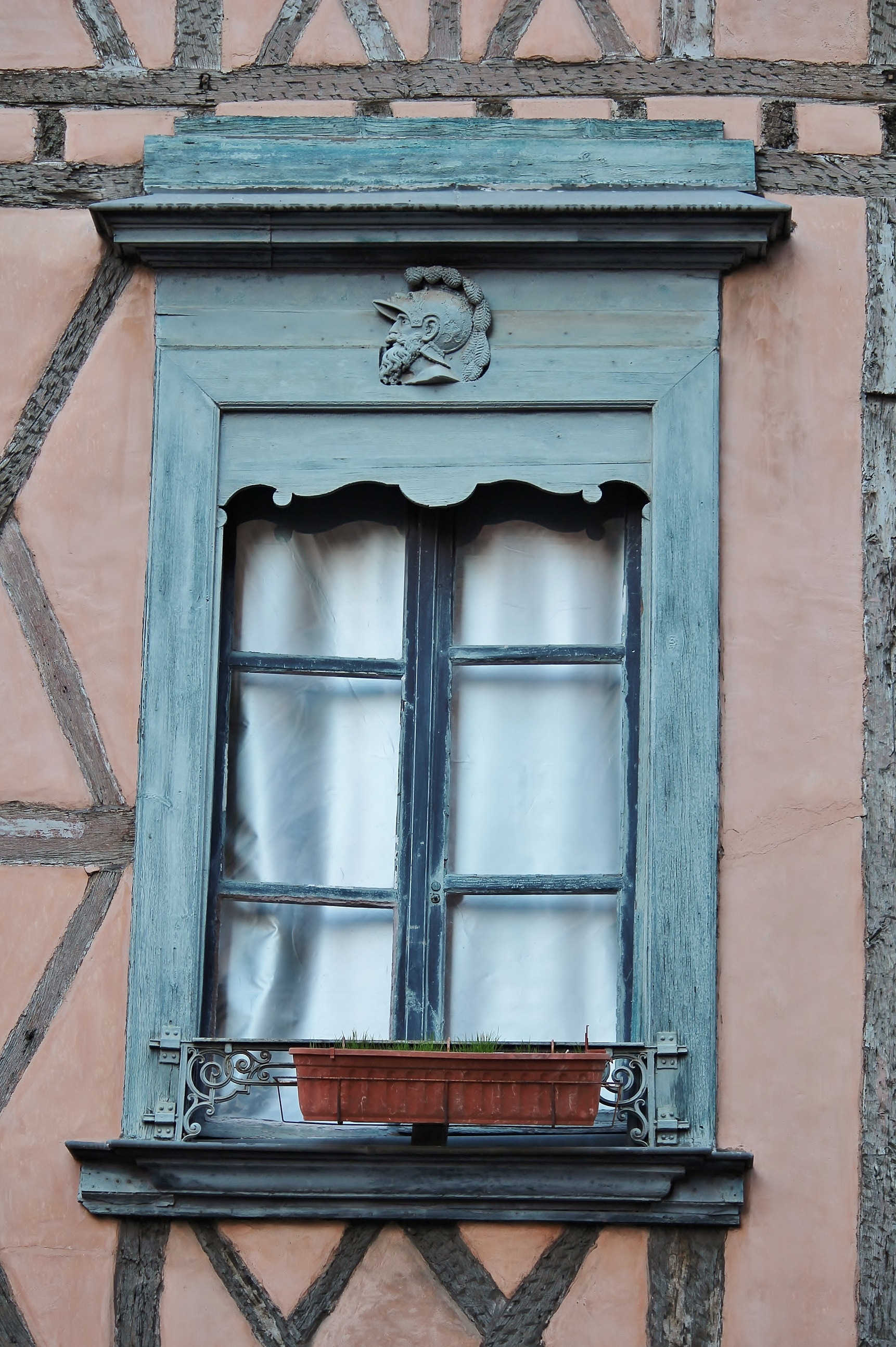
1 rue de Gorsse (wooden).

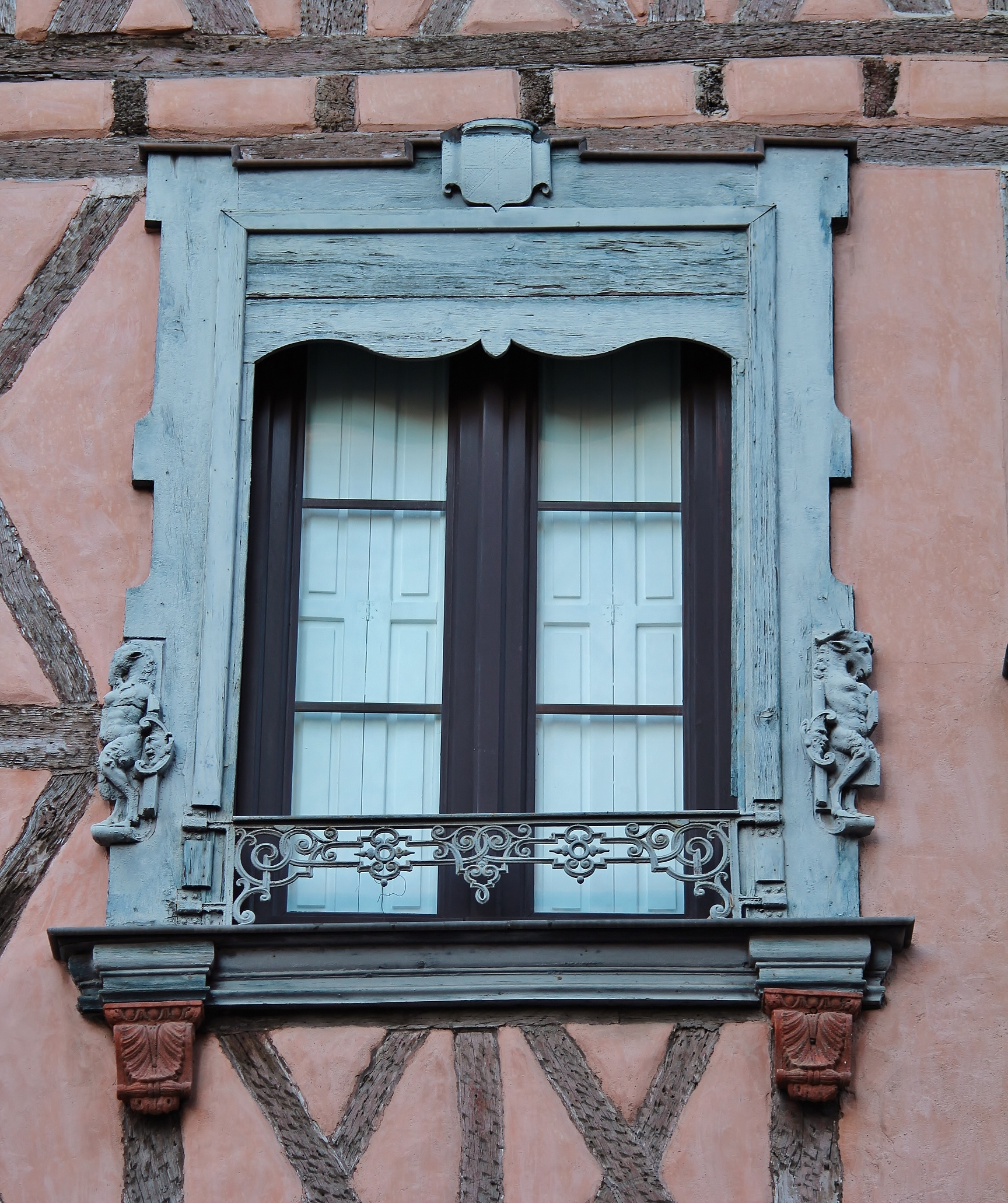
1 rue de Gorsse (wooden).

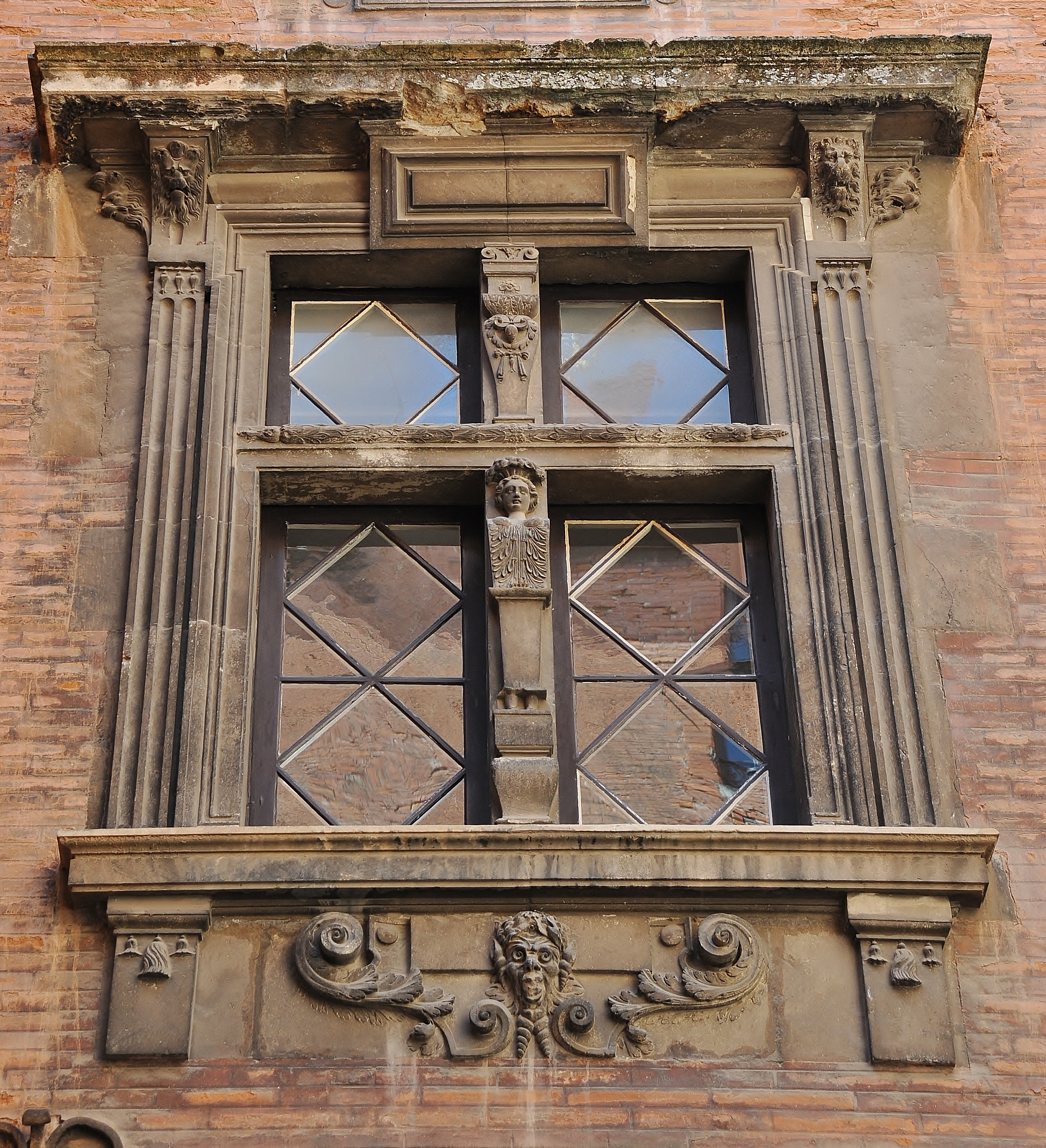
Hôtel de Massas.

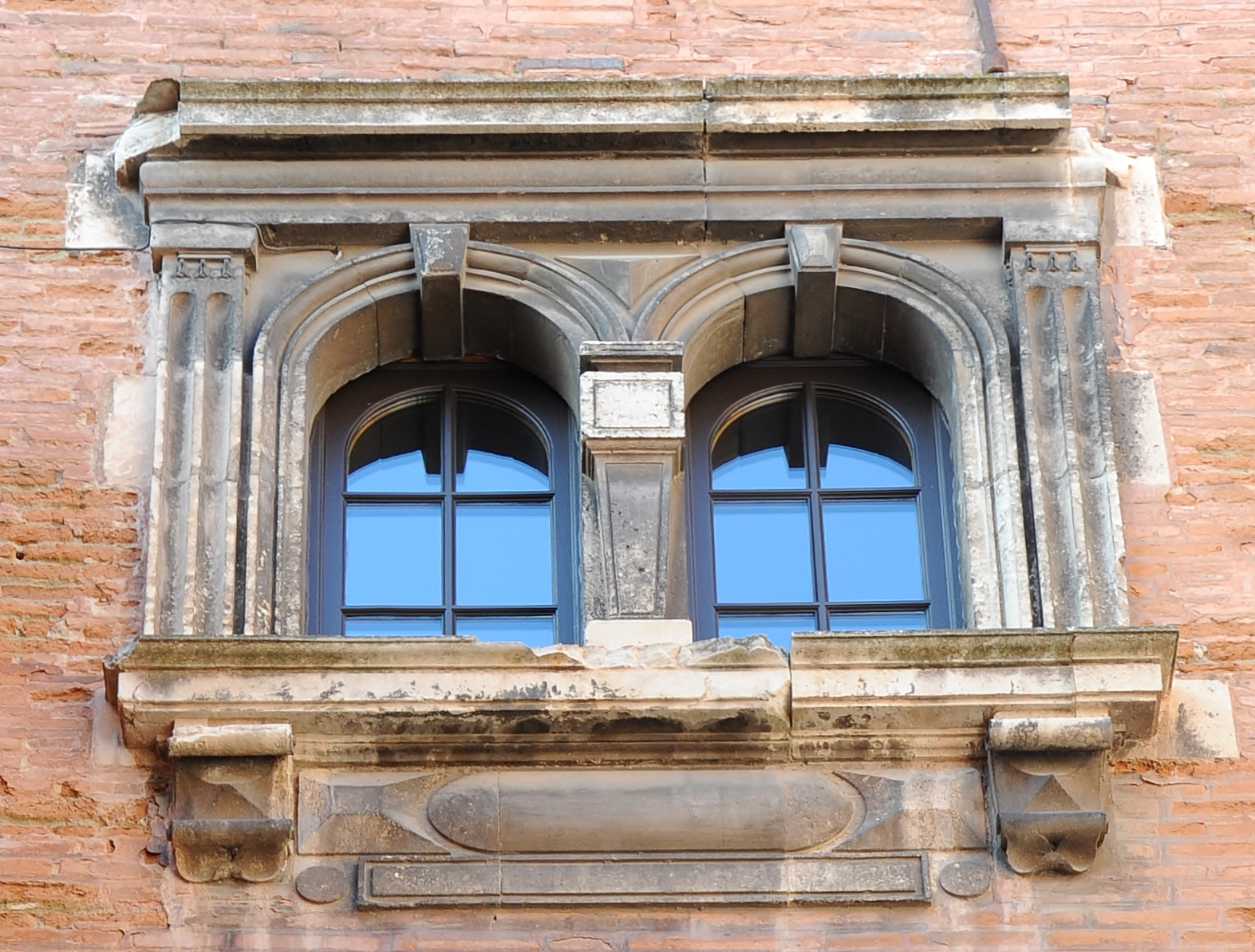
Hôtel de Massas.

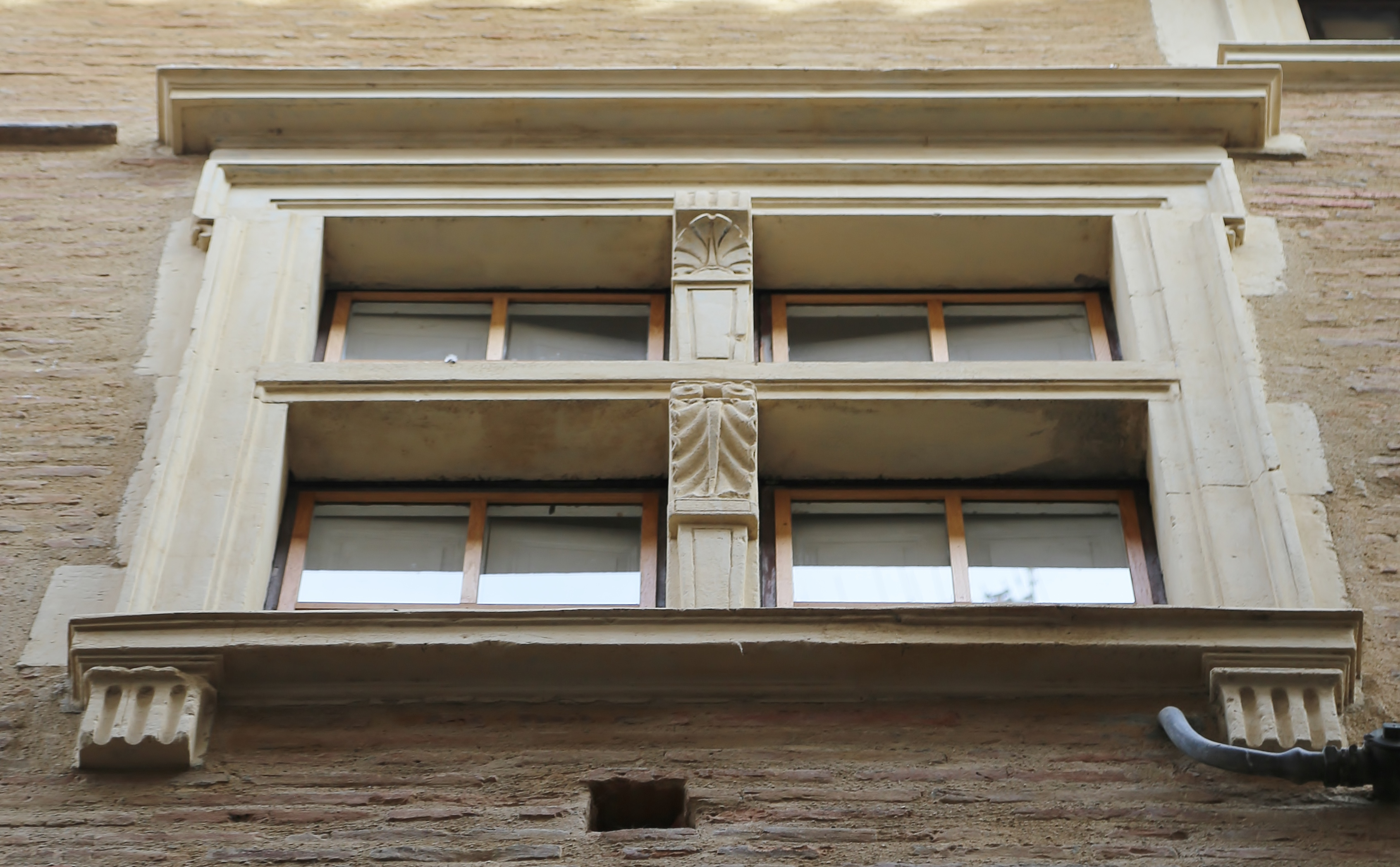
Hôtel Dumay (on the street).

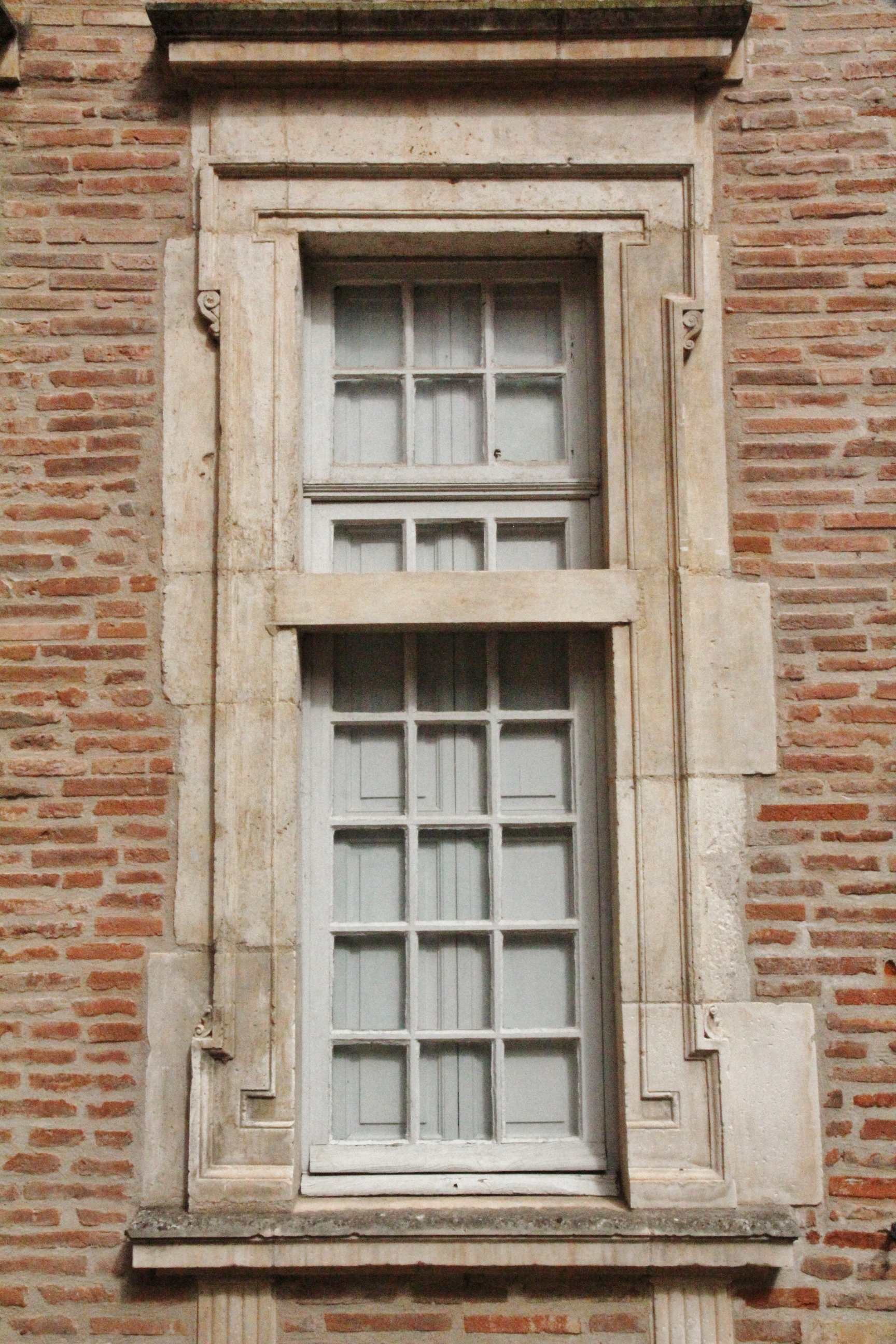
Hôtel Dumay (on the courtyard).

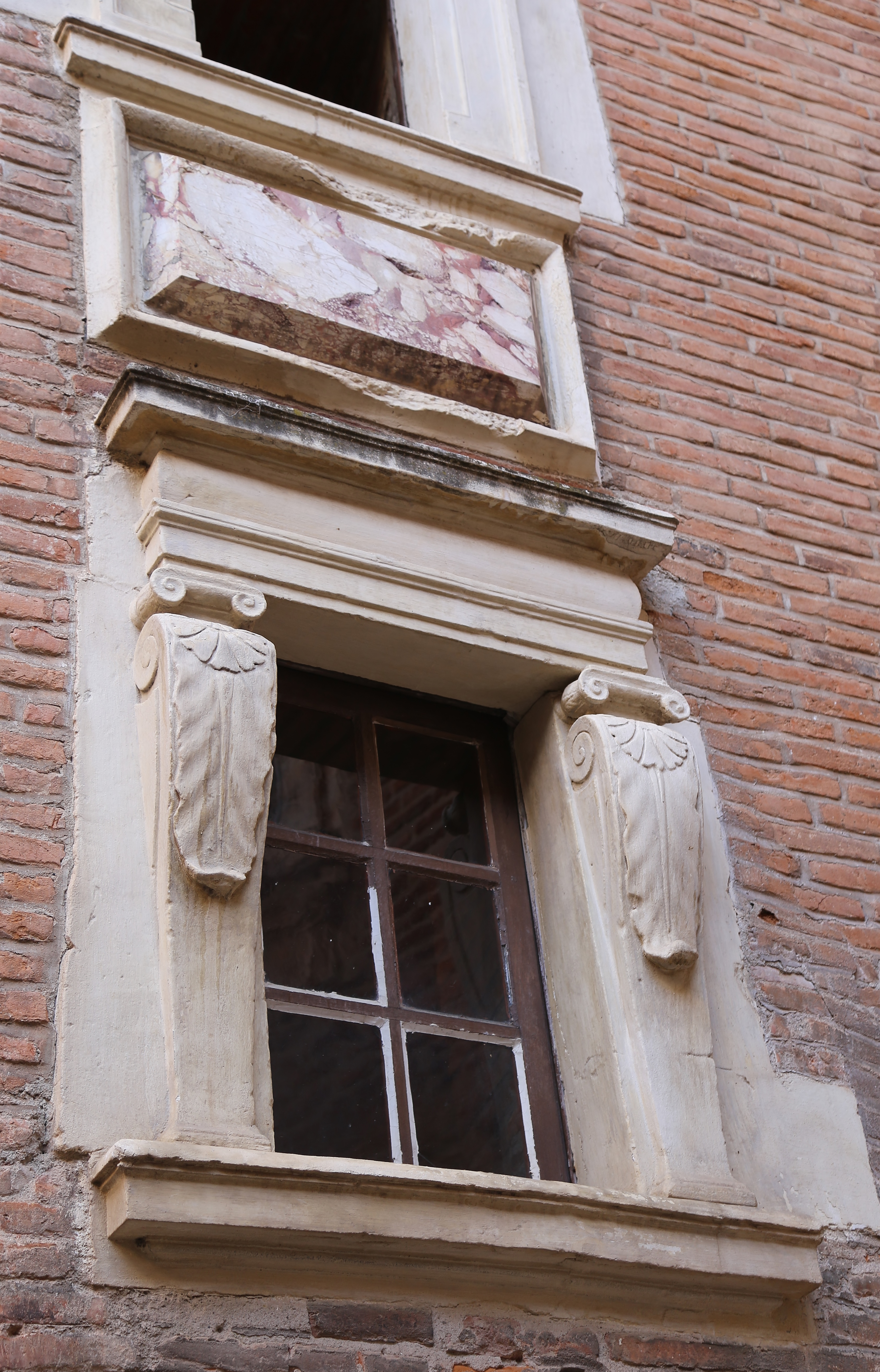
Hôtel Dumay (on the tower).

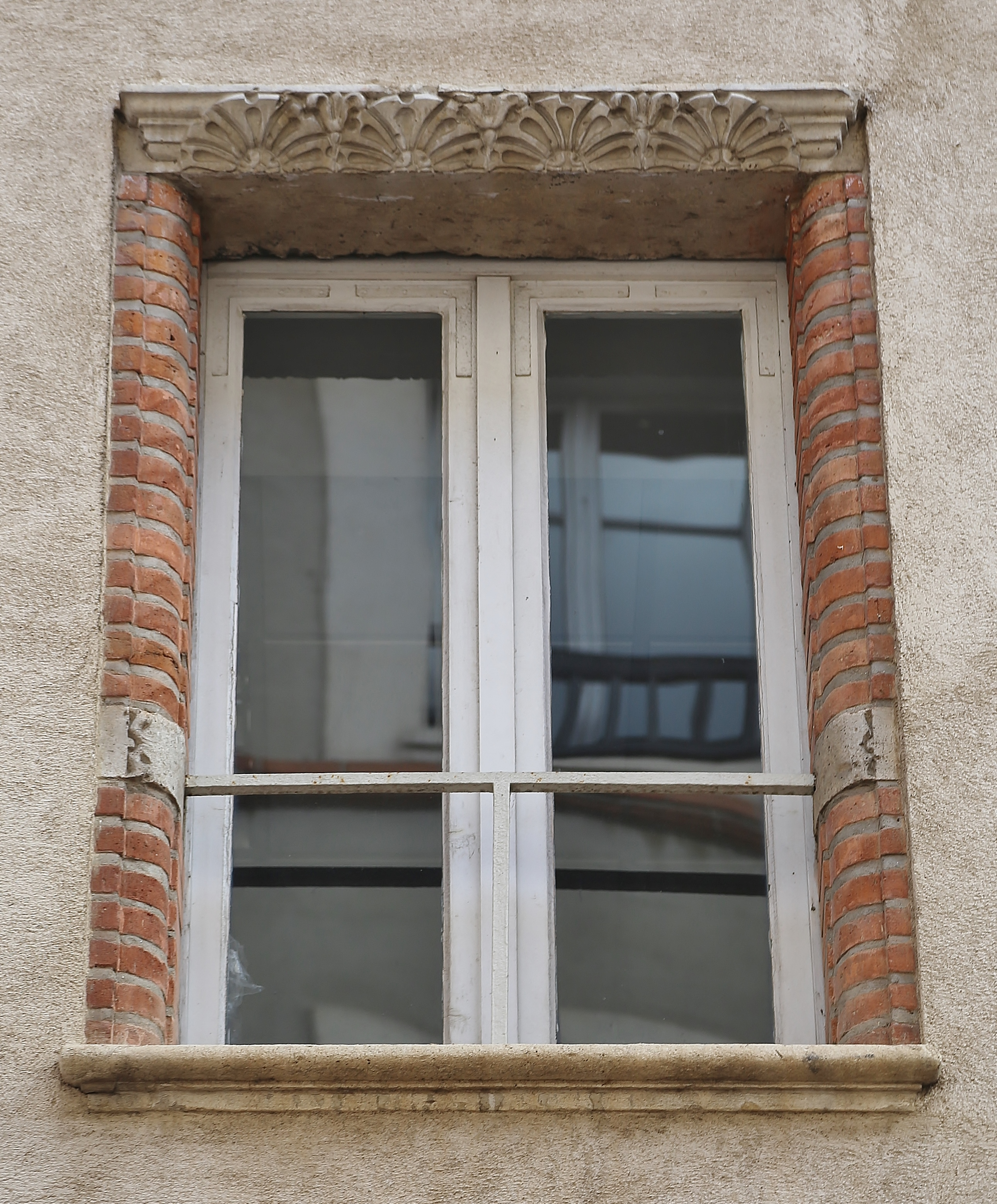
4 rue du Prieuré.

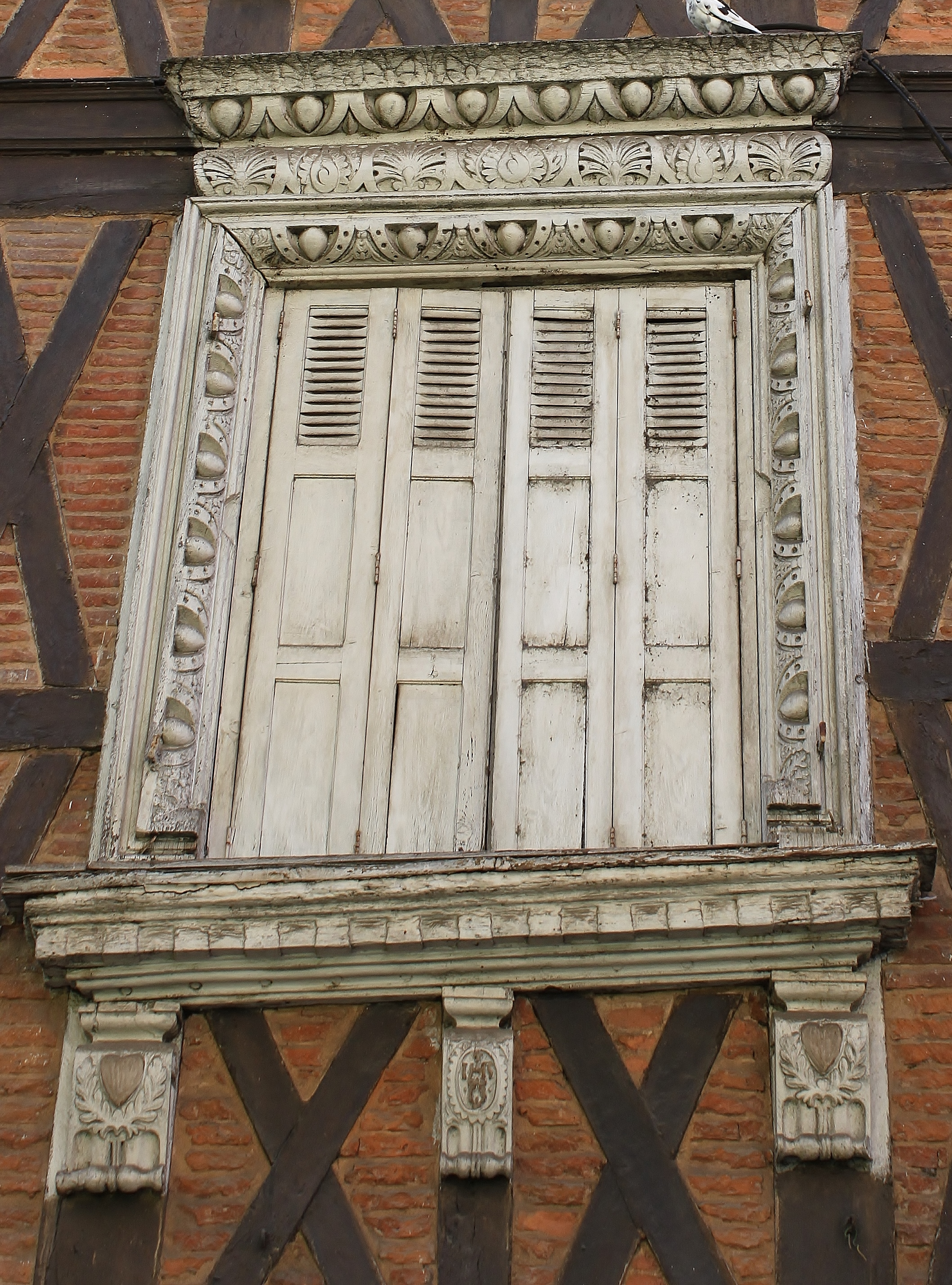
Maison d'Élie Géraud (wooden).

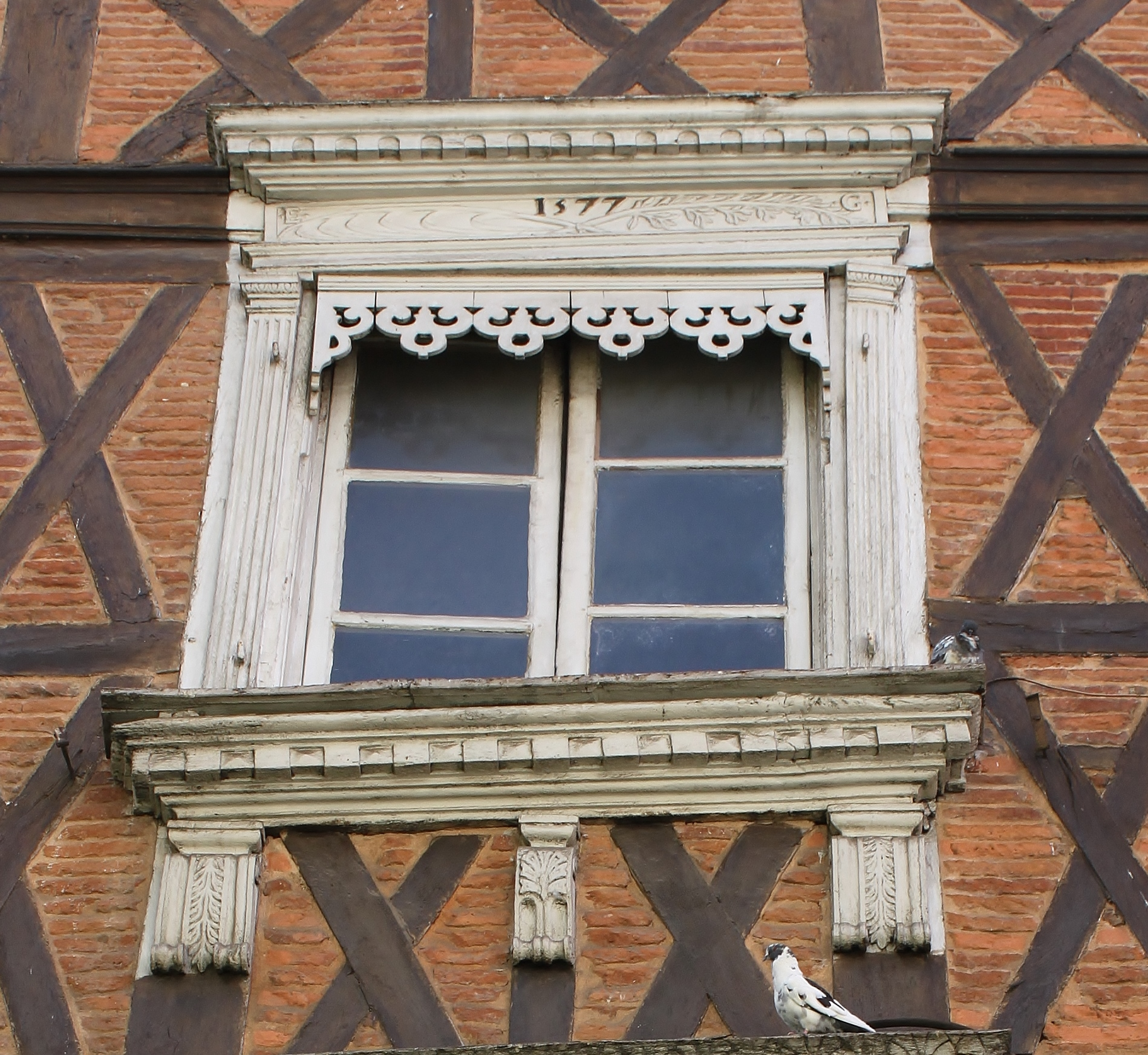
Maison d'Élie Géraud (wooden).

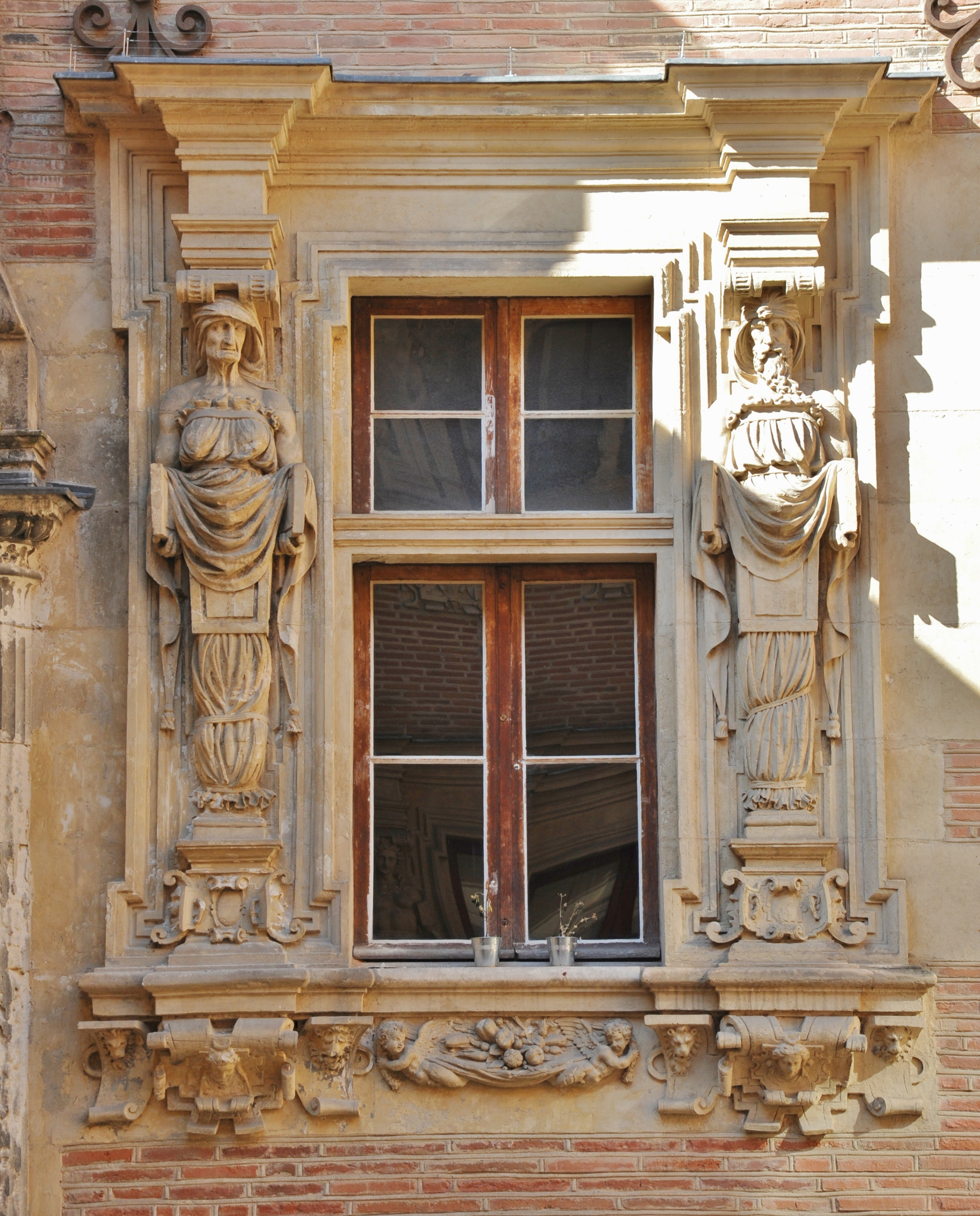
Hôtel du Vieux-Raisin.

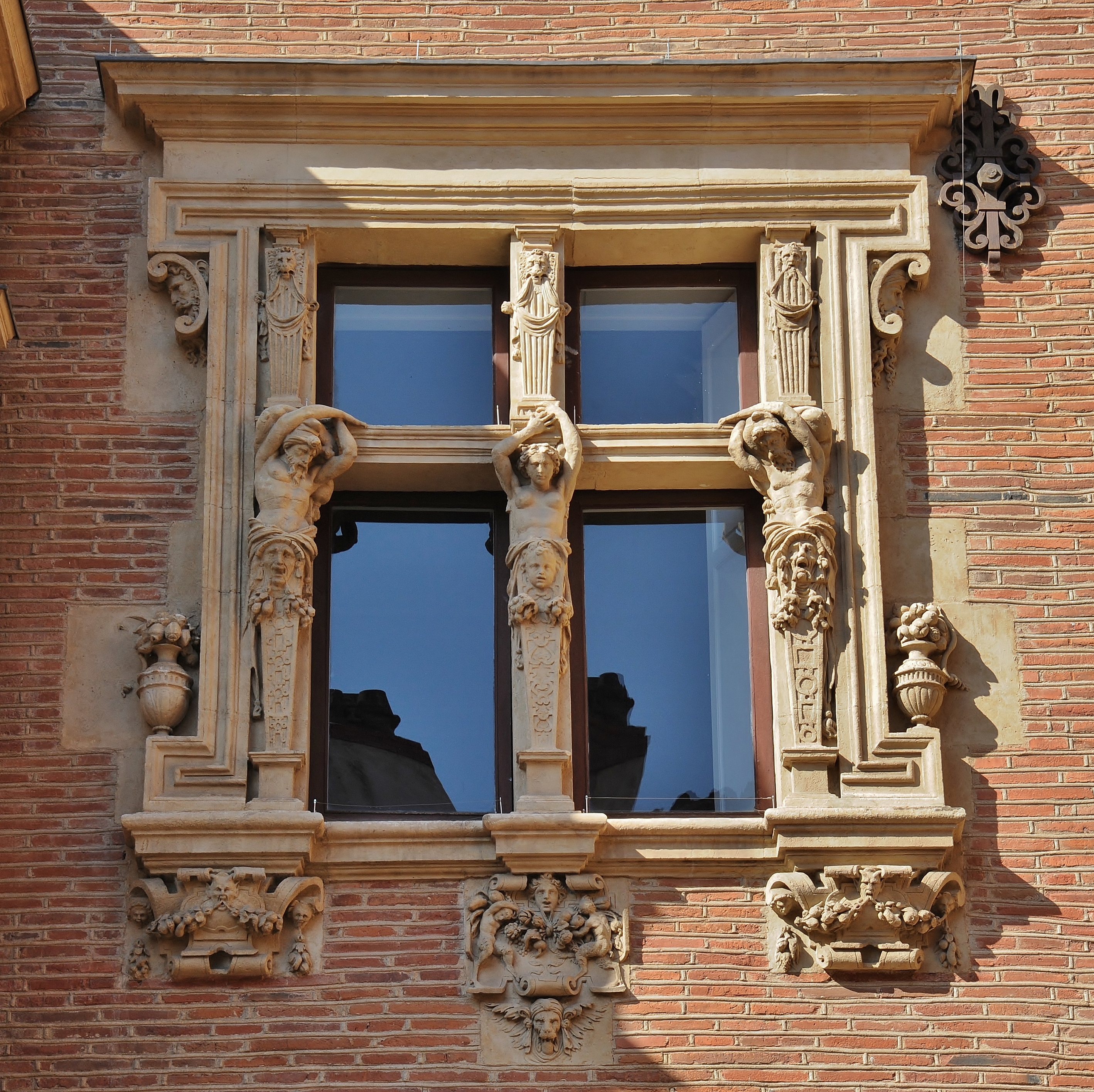
Hôtel du Vieux-Raisin.

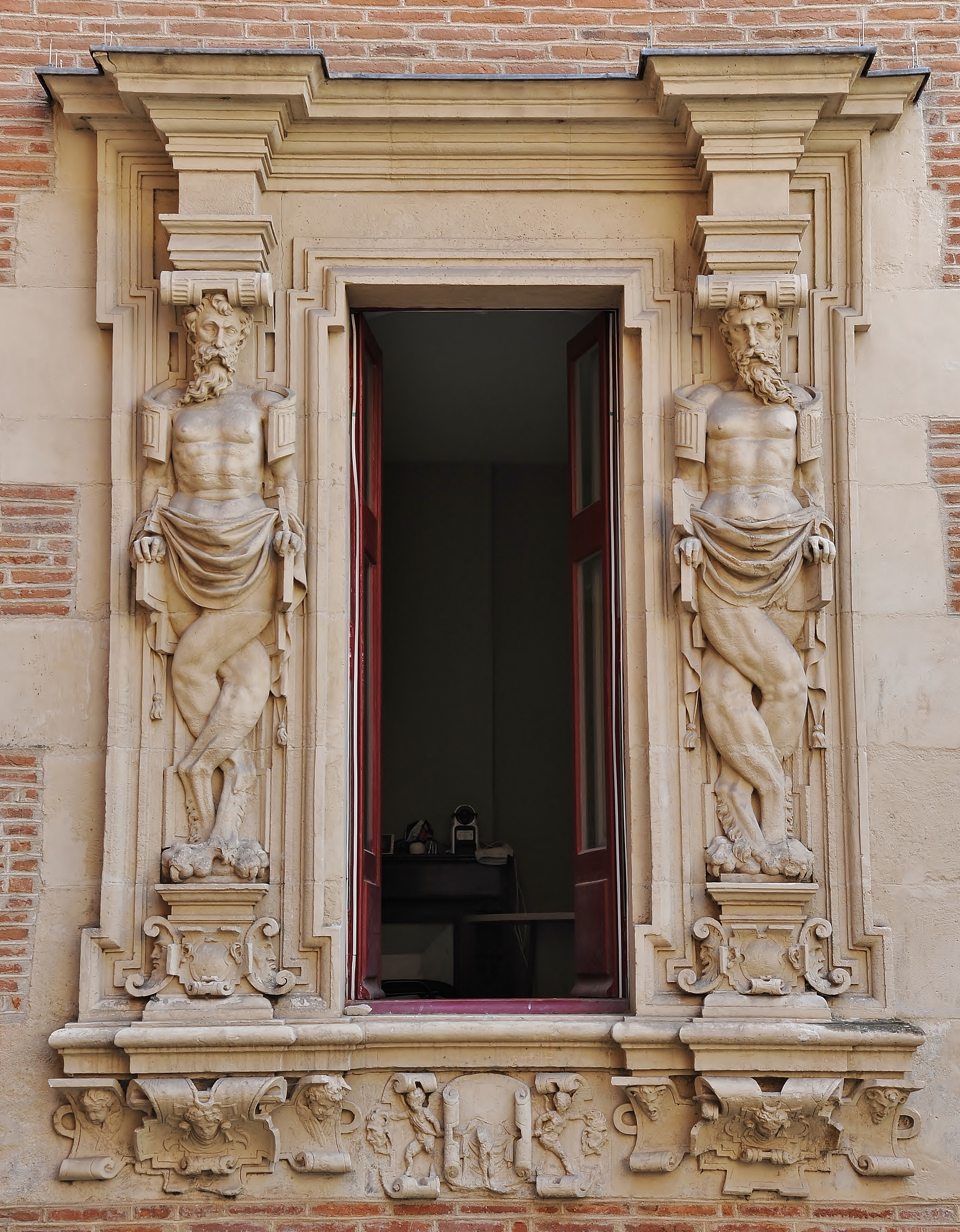
Hôtel du Vieux-Raisin.

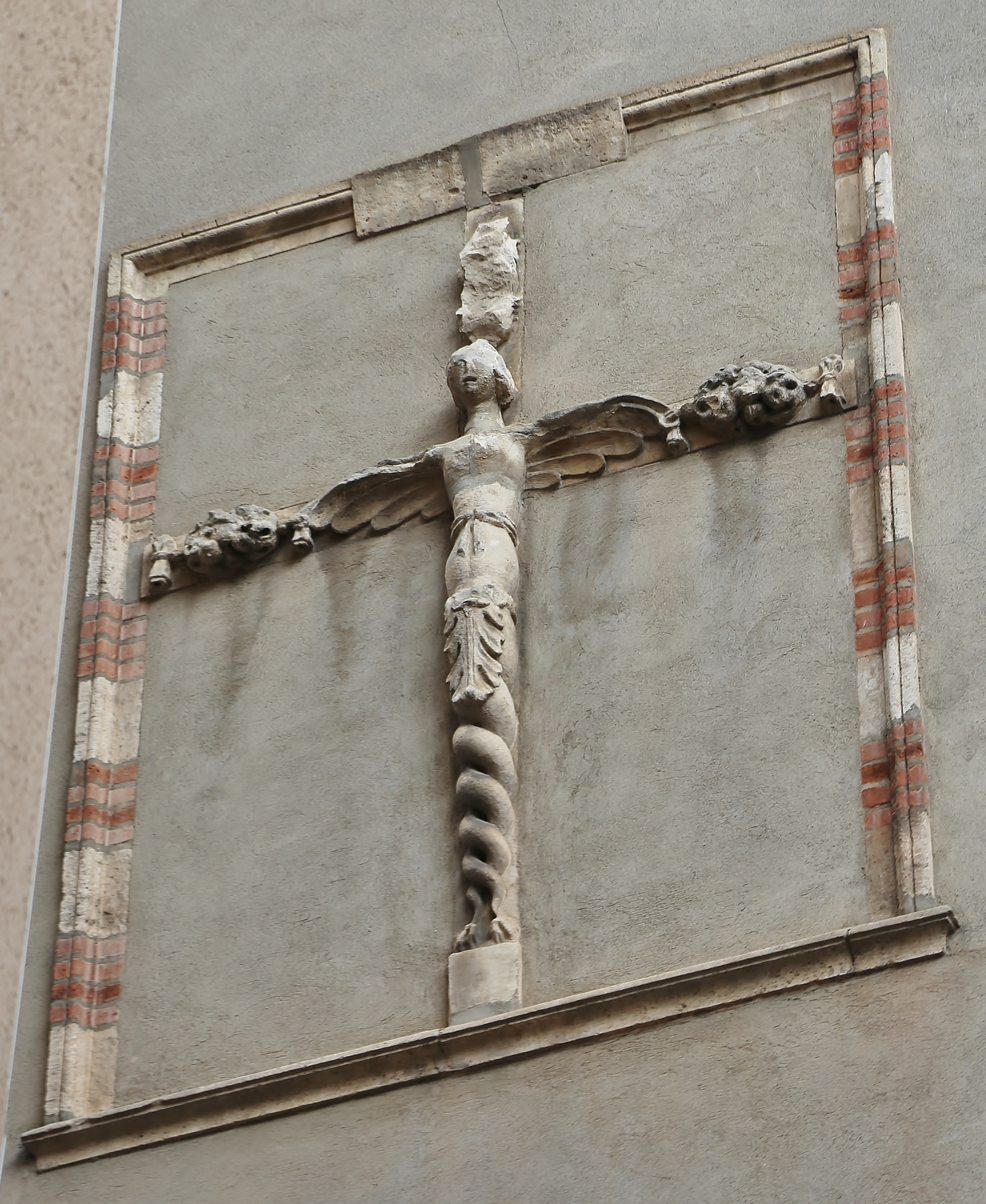
Walled window at 17 rue des Filatiers.

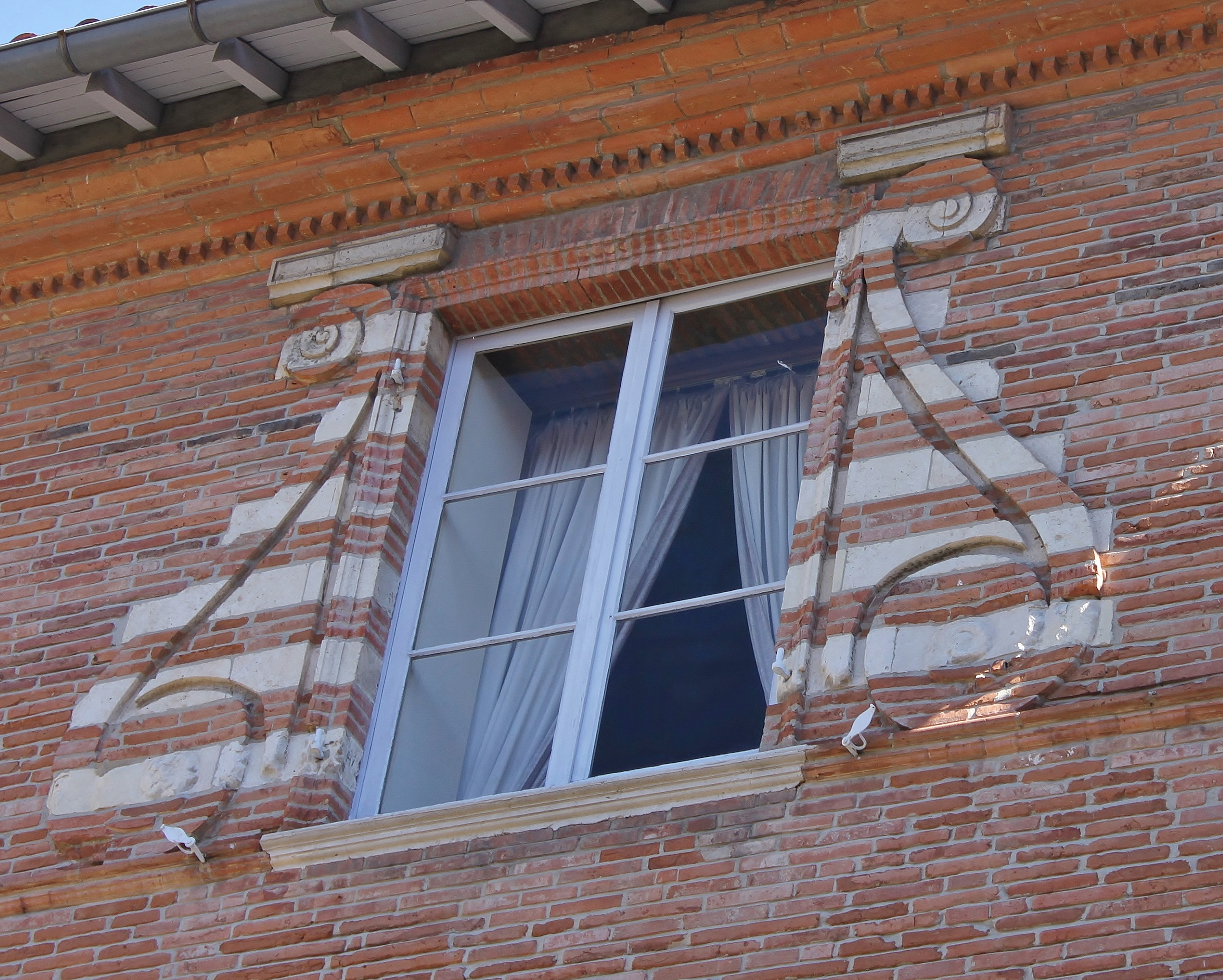
Hôtel de Lestang.

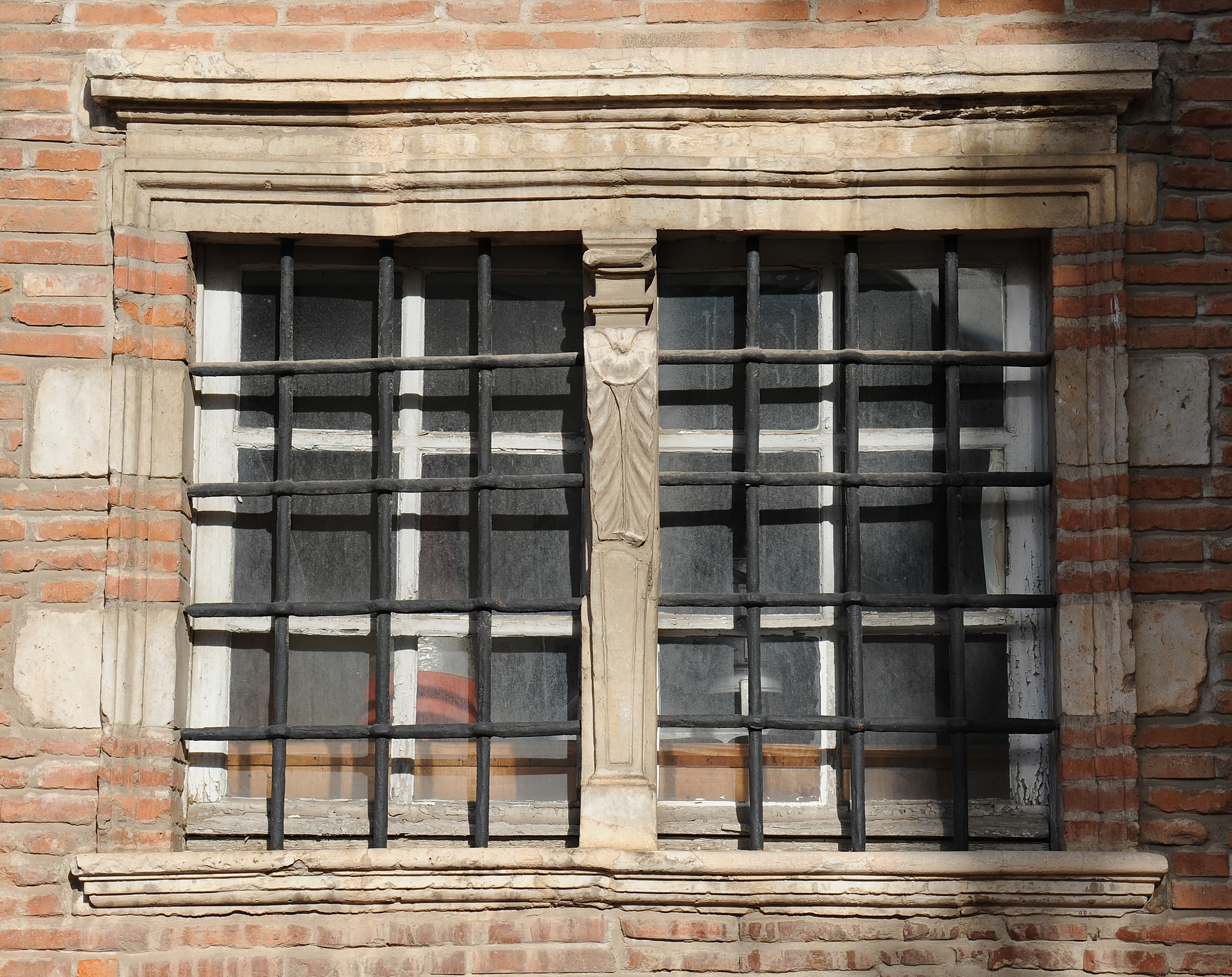
Hôtel de Lestang.

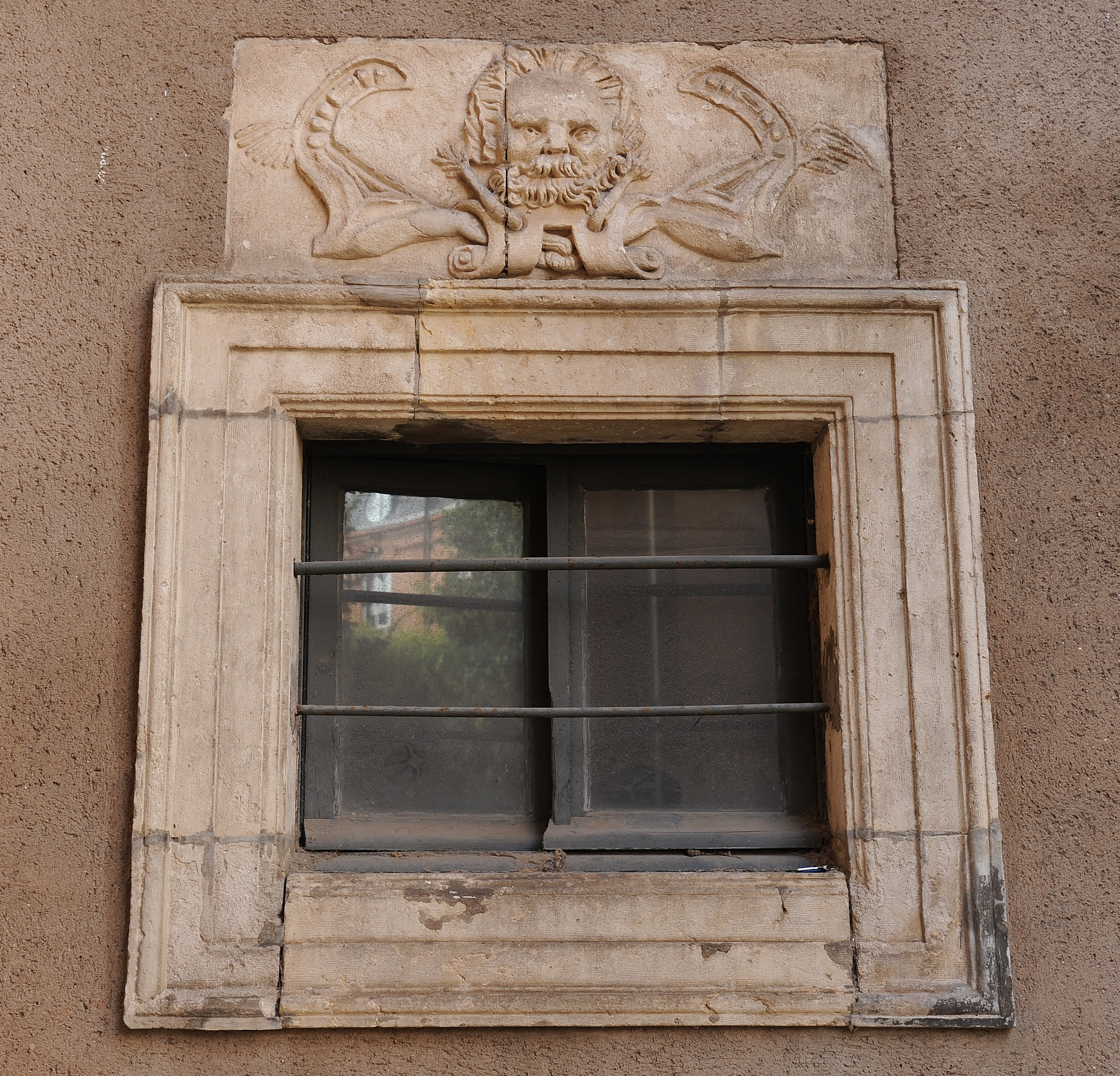
Hôtel Potier-Laterrasse.

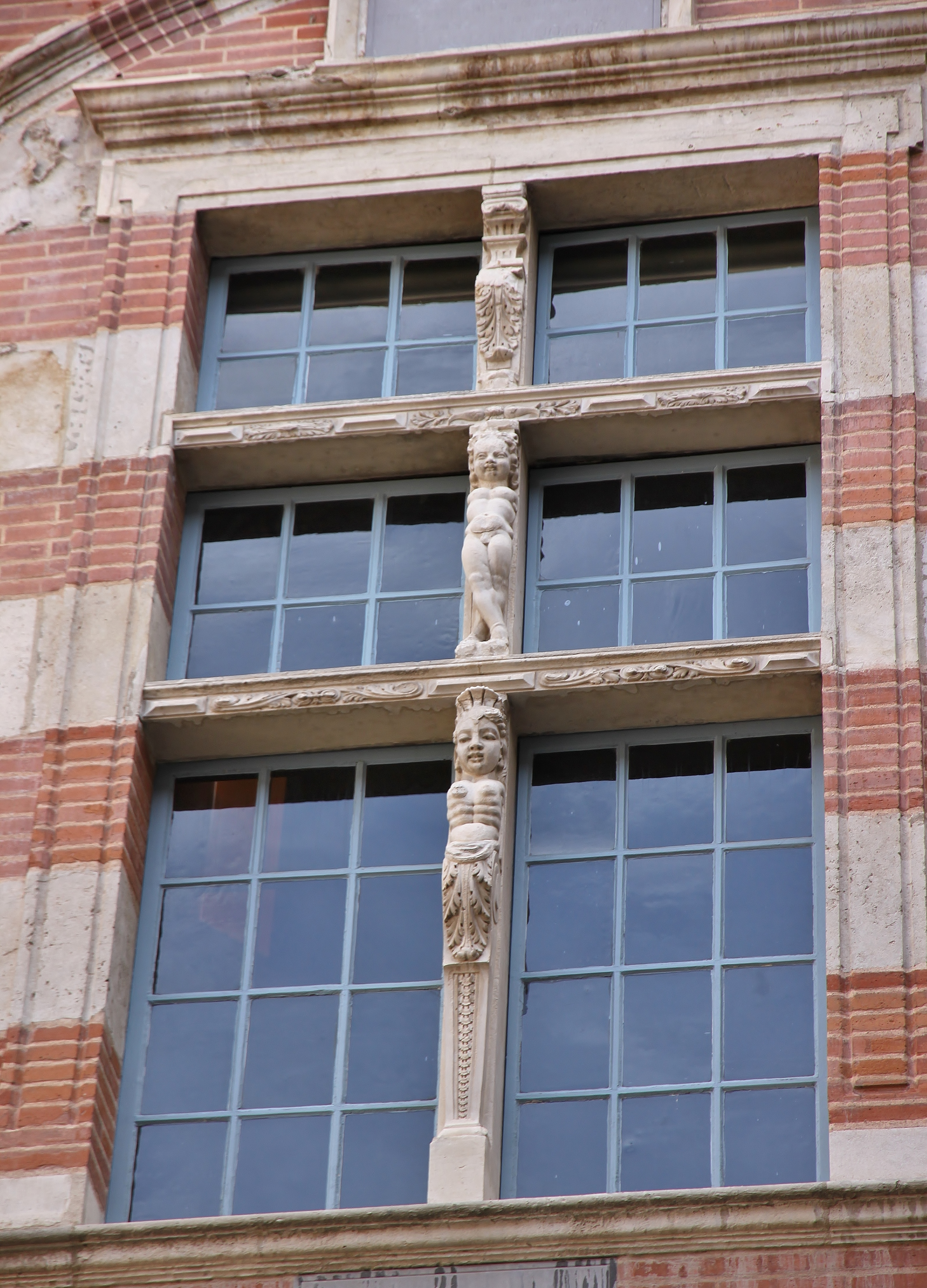
Henry IV courtyard of the Capitole.

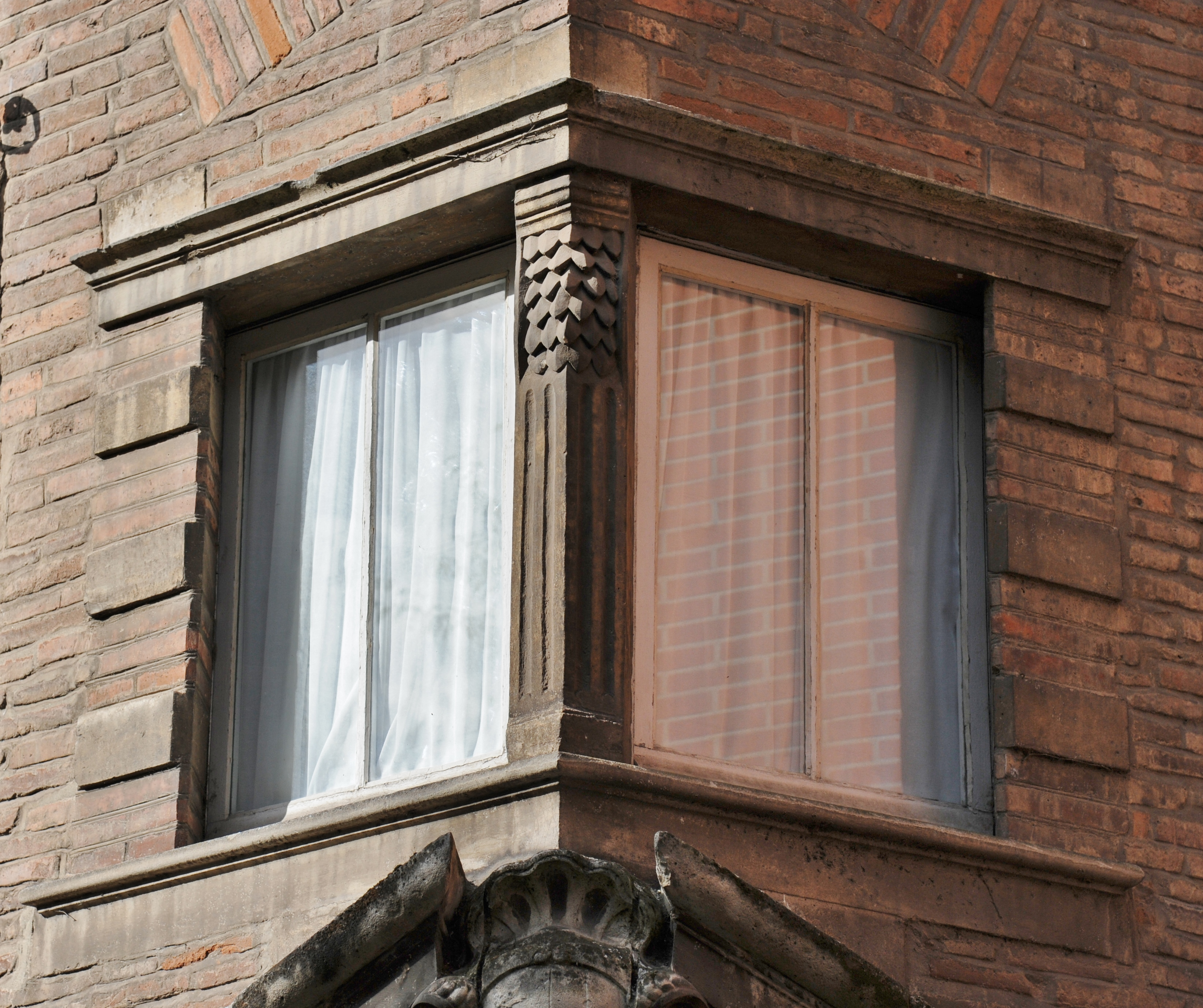
Tour Baderon-Maussac (corner window).

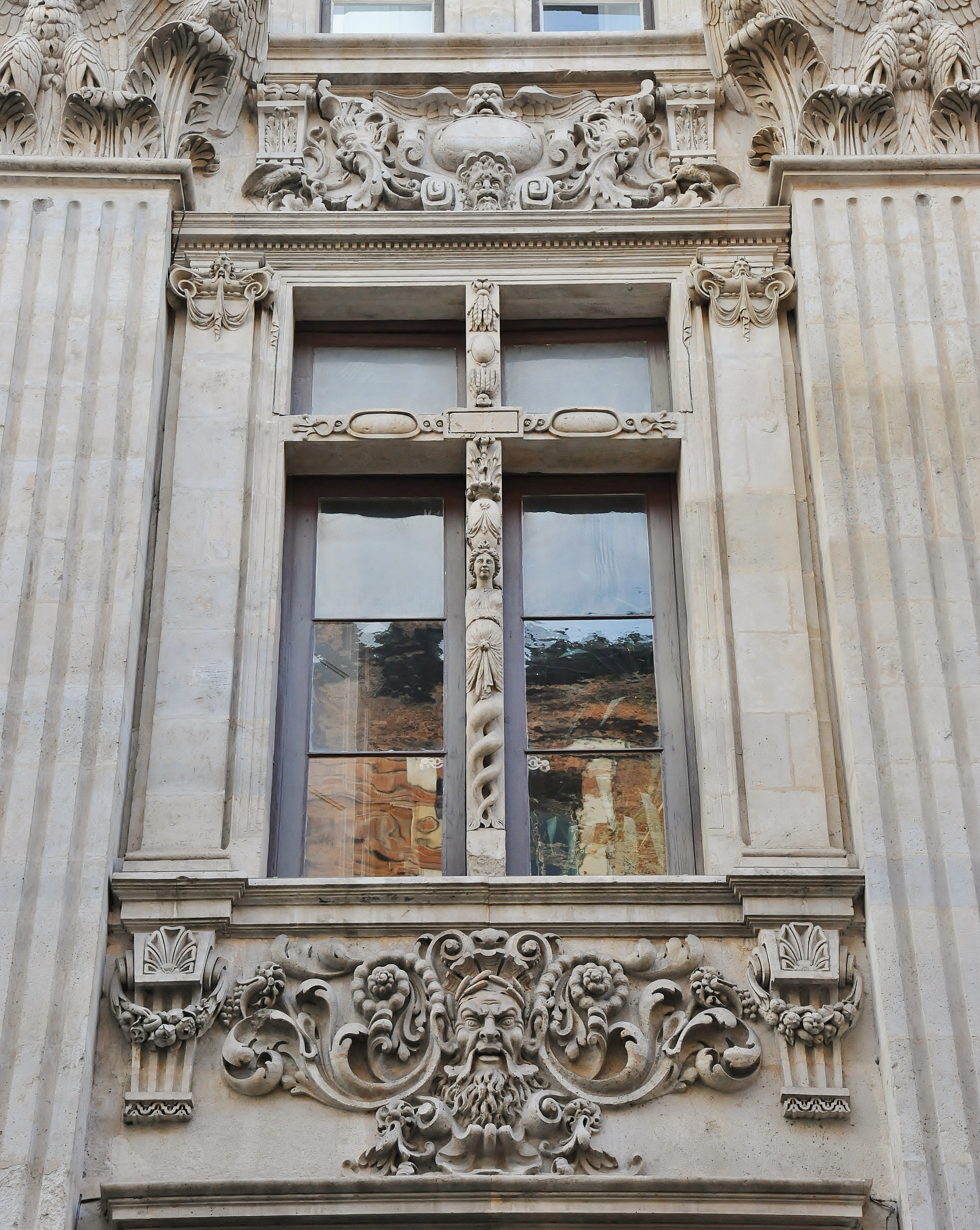
Hôtel de Clary.

== Ornaments characteristic of the Toulouse Renaissance ==
Renaissance architecture can hardly be dissociated from sculpted ornament. Among the decorative attributes usually associated with the Renaissance, there are some that have experienced a particular vigour or diversity in Toulouse. They bear witness to the aspirations of owners always in search of scholarly references as well as to the artistic vitality of the city.

=== The speaking facades ===
Under the reign of king Francis I of France, the written word asserted itself as a privileged means of expressing power. Simultaneously, by granting a new place to humanity, the Renaissance fostered reflection on the human condition. These considerations manifested on various buildings in Toulouse through inscriptions sculpted directly onto facades, akin to speeches intended for the public space.

In his Extraordinary book, citing the example of ancient triumphal arches, Sebastiano Serlio explained that he interrupted the entablature of his portals to make room for the desire to display the culture or ambition of the owner: "There are even some who, in every small work they have made, would like enough space and place to put letters, coat of arms, mottos, and similar things".

From honorary claims to displayed humility, from aphorisms of ancient philosophy to biblical sentences, the inscriptions on the "speaking facades" chose Latin to showcase the moral and intellectual dimension of their patron. In the city where the Dominican Order and the oldest literary institution in Europe were founded, then an administrative and judicial metropolis, the cultural, political, and intellectual context lent itself to the public expression of the art of self-governance.

However, the use of inscriptions was not systematic; for instance, Pierre d'Assézat preferred a different architectural language for his famous mansion.

The main examples of these speaking facades are: in Hôtel de Bernuy SI DEUS PRO NOBIS (the beginning of a phrase from the Bible meaning "If God be for us, who can be against us?"), at the Hôtel du Vieux-Raisin VIVITUR INGENIO CAETERA MORTIS ERUNT ("Genius lives on, all else is mortal") and TOGUATI MAINERII EDES || LINGUA CONSTRUCTE FLORENT ("The dwelling constructed by the eloquence of Professor Maynier is flourishing"), at the Hôtel d'Aymès NE TE QUAESIVERIS EXTRA ("Do not seek outside yourself"), at the Hôtel Dumay TEMPORE ET DILIGENTIA ("By time and industry"), at the Hôtel d'Ulmo DURUM PACIENTIA FRANGO ("By patience I break what is hard"), at the Hôtel Dahus-Tournoer ESTO MICHI DOMINE TURRIS FORTITUDINIS A FACIE INIMICI ("Be for me, Lord, a tower of strength against the enemy"), at the Hôtel Molinier SUSTINE, ABSTINE ("Bear, and forbear"). In the courtyard of the Hôtel Delpech, eight windows built between 1554 and 1560 bear Latin inscriptions taken from the Bible, the most legible of which reads as follows: QUI TIMENT DOMINUM NON ERUNT INCREDIBILES VERBO ILLIUS ("They that fear the Lord will not be incredulous to his word").

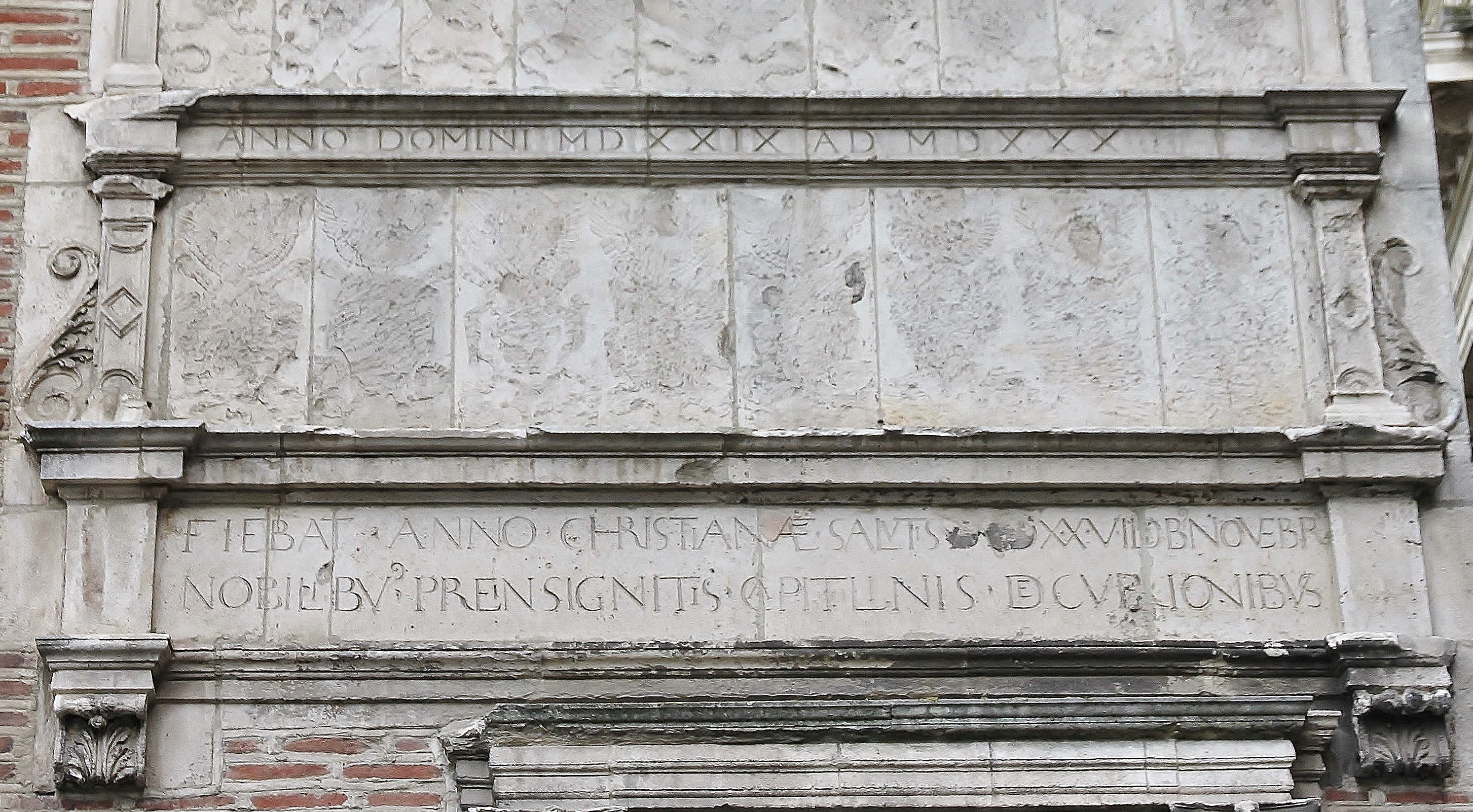
Former Capitole Archive Tower: The capitouls present themselves as decurions to assert a Roman origin

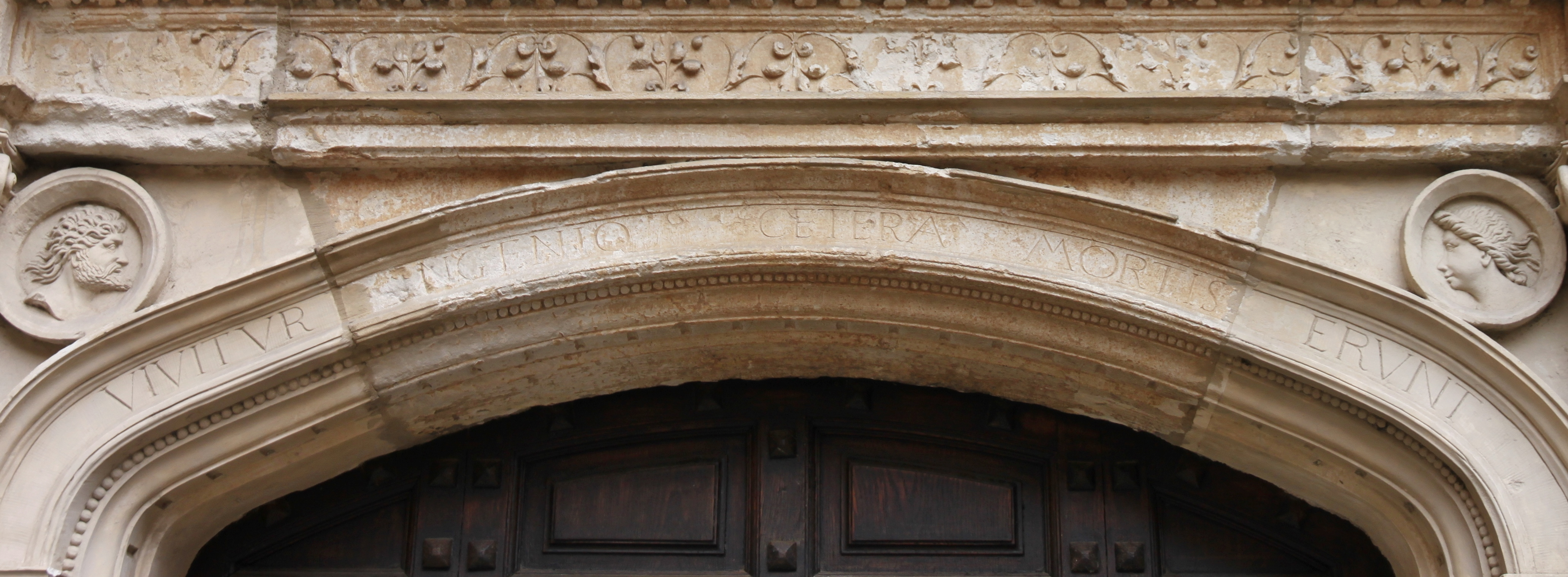
Hôtel du Vieux-Raisin: VIVITUR INGENIO CETERA MORTIS ERUNT

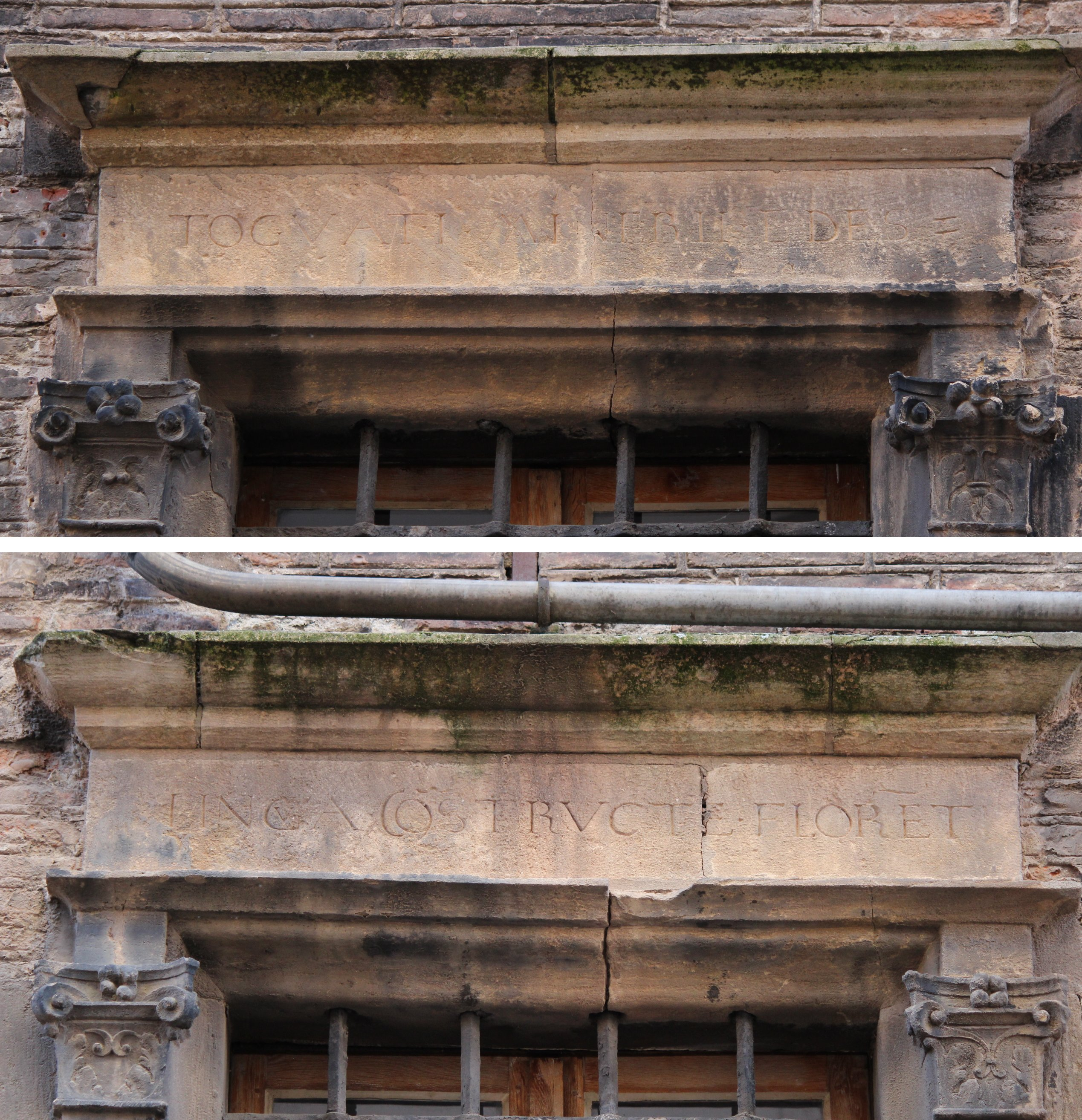
Hôtel du Vieux-Raisin (Félix street) : TOGUATI MAINERII EDES / LINGUA CONSTRUCTE FLORENT

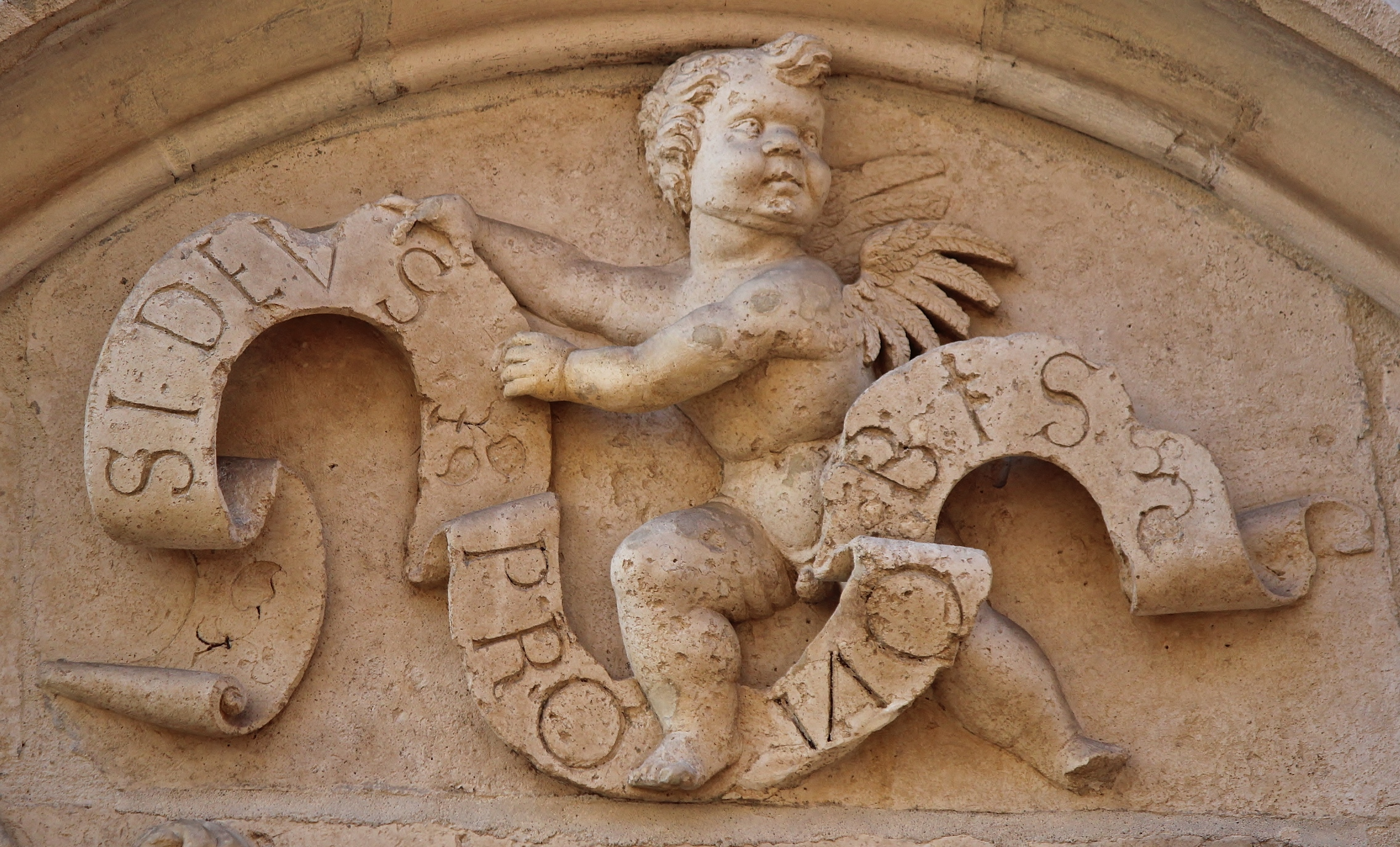
Hôtel de Bernuy (on the street): SI DEUS PRO NOBIS

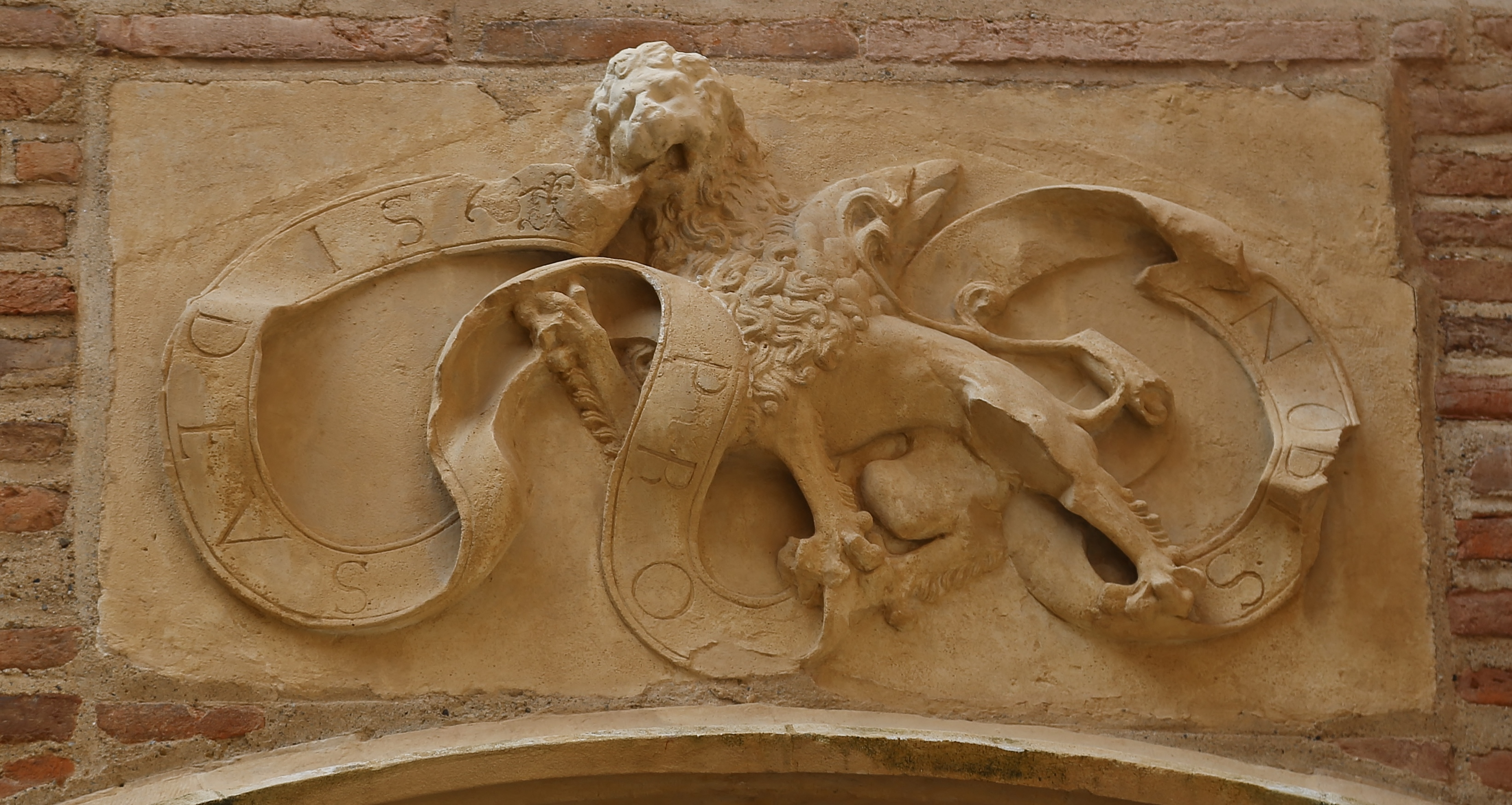
Hôtel de Bernuy (on the 2nd courtyard): SI DEUS PRO NOBIS

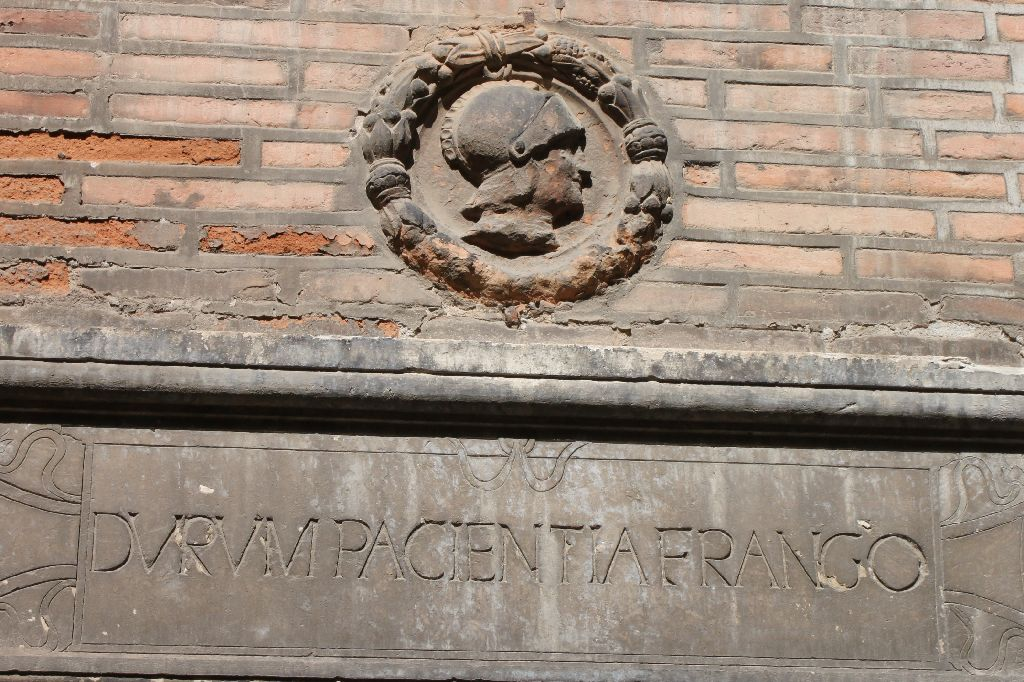
Hôtel d'Ulmo: DURUM PACIENTIA FRANGO

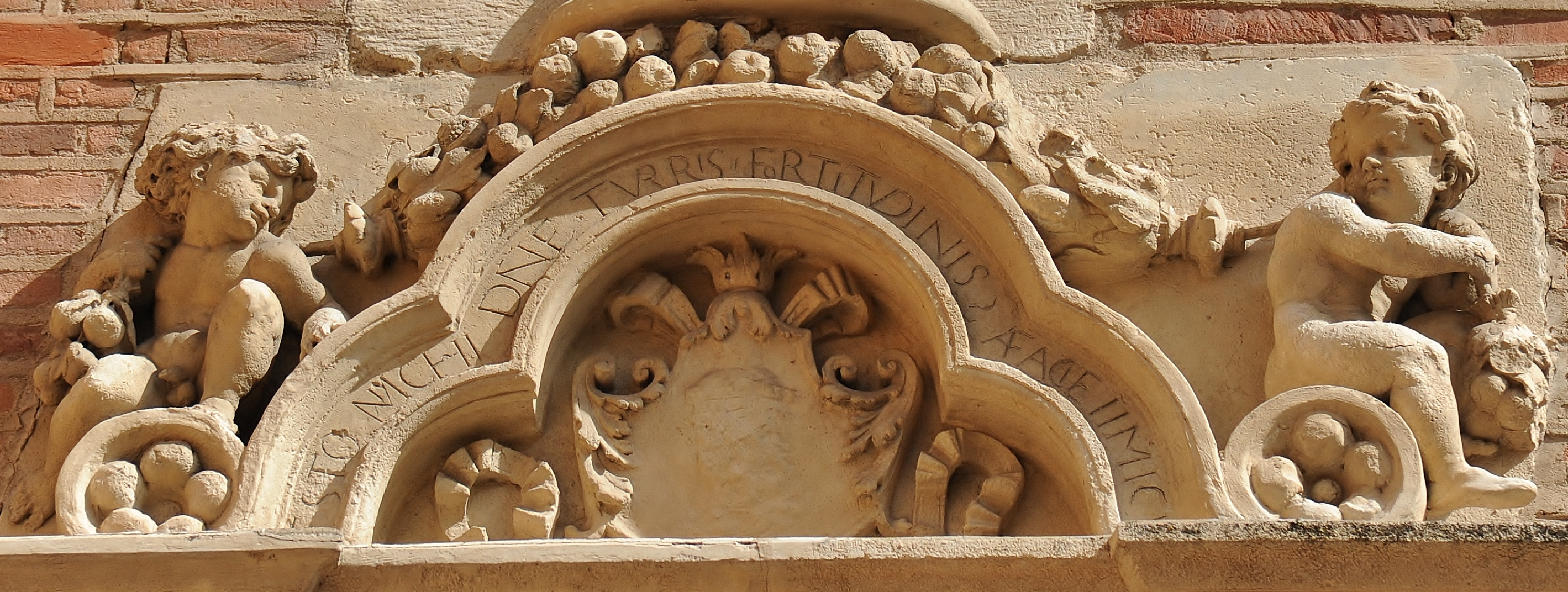
Hôtel de Tournoer: ESTO MICHI DOMINE TURRIS FORTITUDINIS A FACIE INIMICI

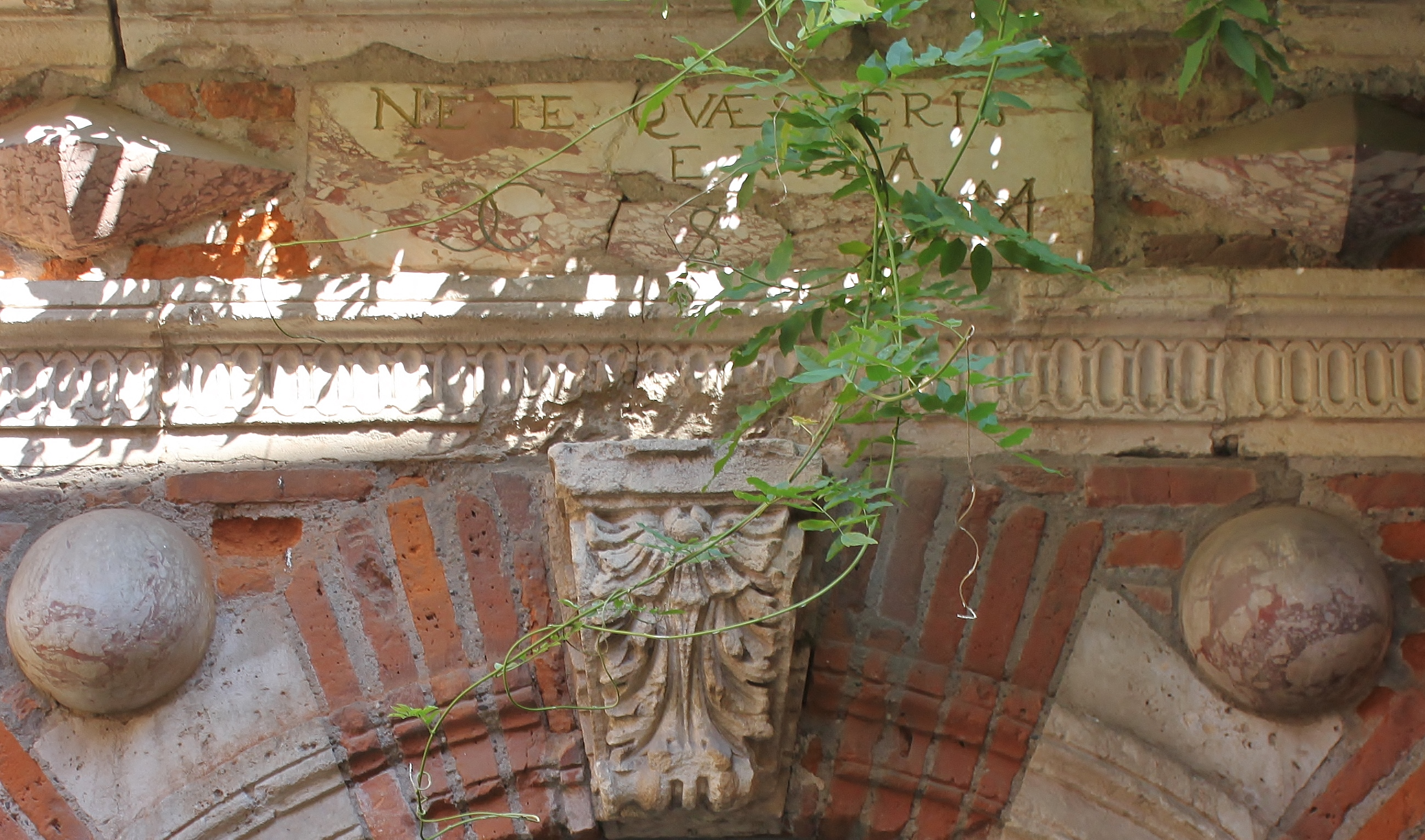
Hôtel d'Aymès: NE TE QUAESIVERIS EXTRA

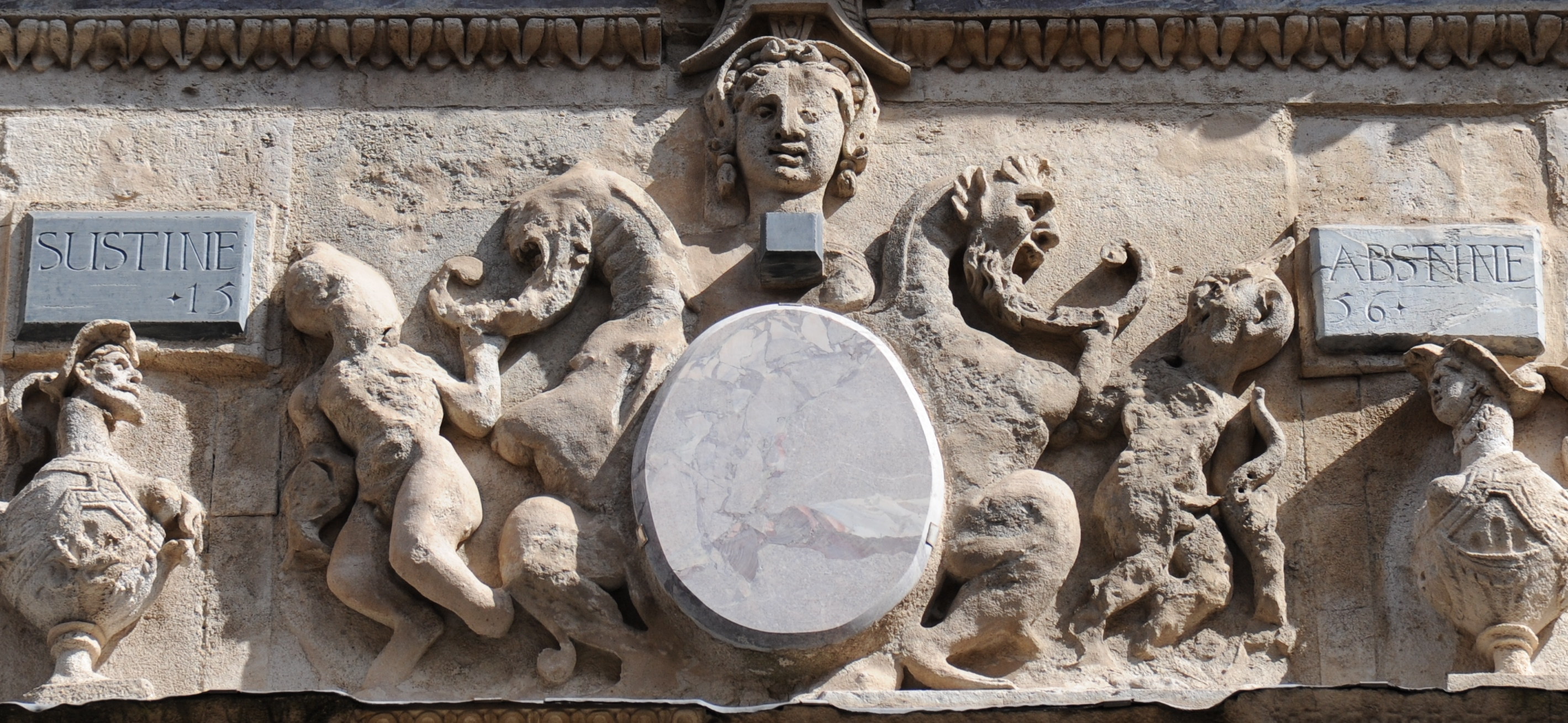
Hôtel Molinier: SUSTINE, ABSTINE

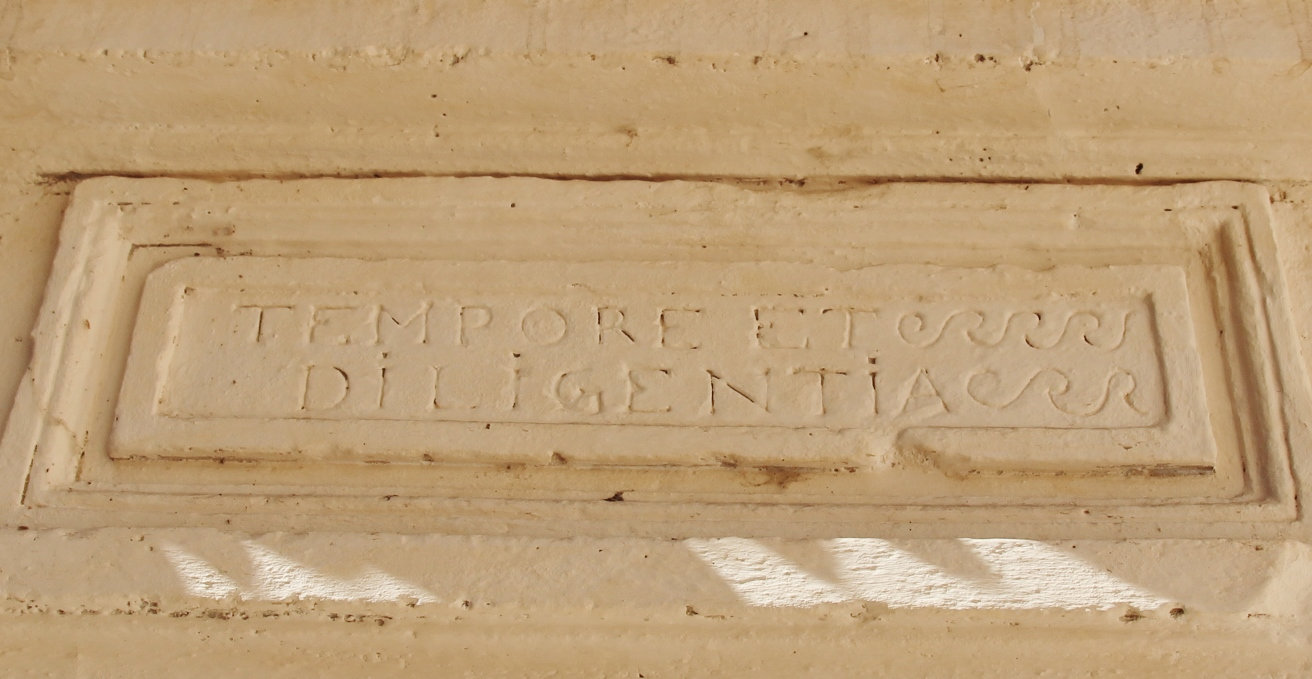
Hôtel Dumay: TEMPORE ET DILIGENTIA

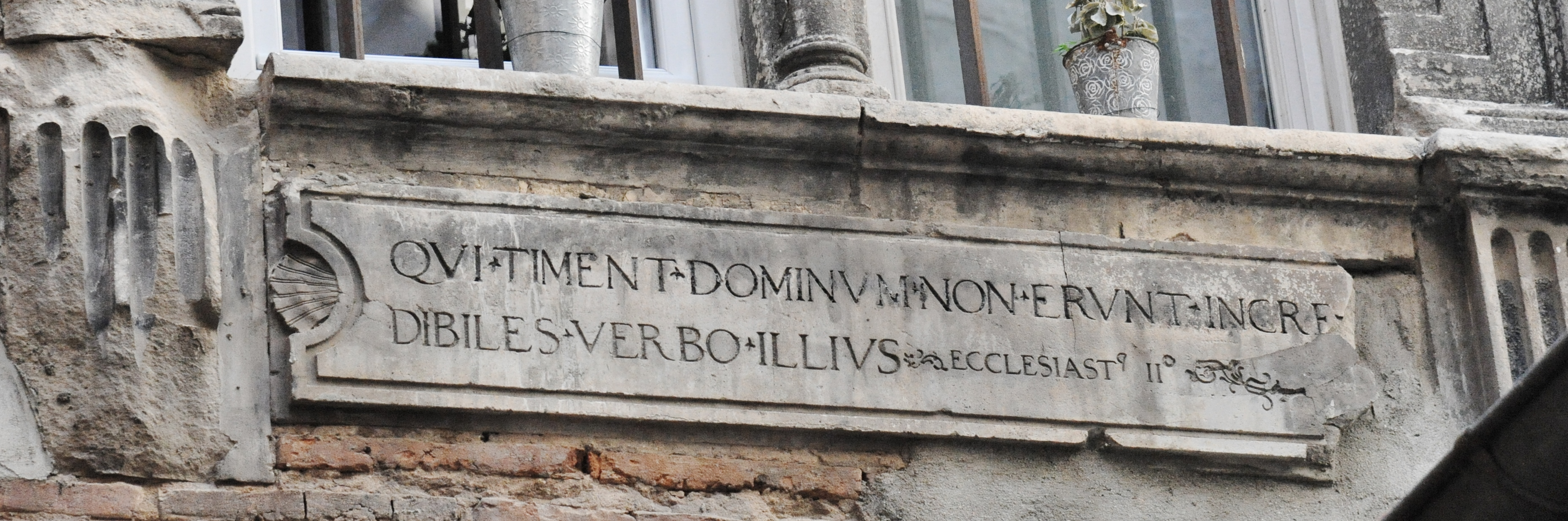
Hôtel Delpech: QUI TIMENT DOMINUM NON ERUNT INCREDIBILES VERBO ILLIUS

=== First ornaments of the Renaissance ===
Pilasters, candelabra, scrolls, grotesques, margent, horns of plenty and other designs from Italy first replaced the Gothic decorations. Certain figures crossed the century: the putti (cherubs) can be found in the Hôtel du Vieux-Raisin (1520s), the Hôtel de Bernuy and the Hôtel de Tournoer (1530s), the Hôtel de Molinier (1552) and the Hôtel de Clary (around 1610); the same goes for the lion mufles used as gargoyles, inspired by those of ancient temples such as the Maison Carrée in Nîmes.

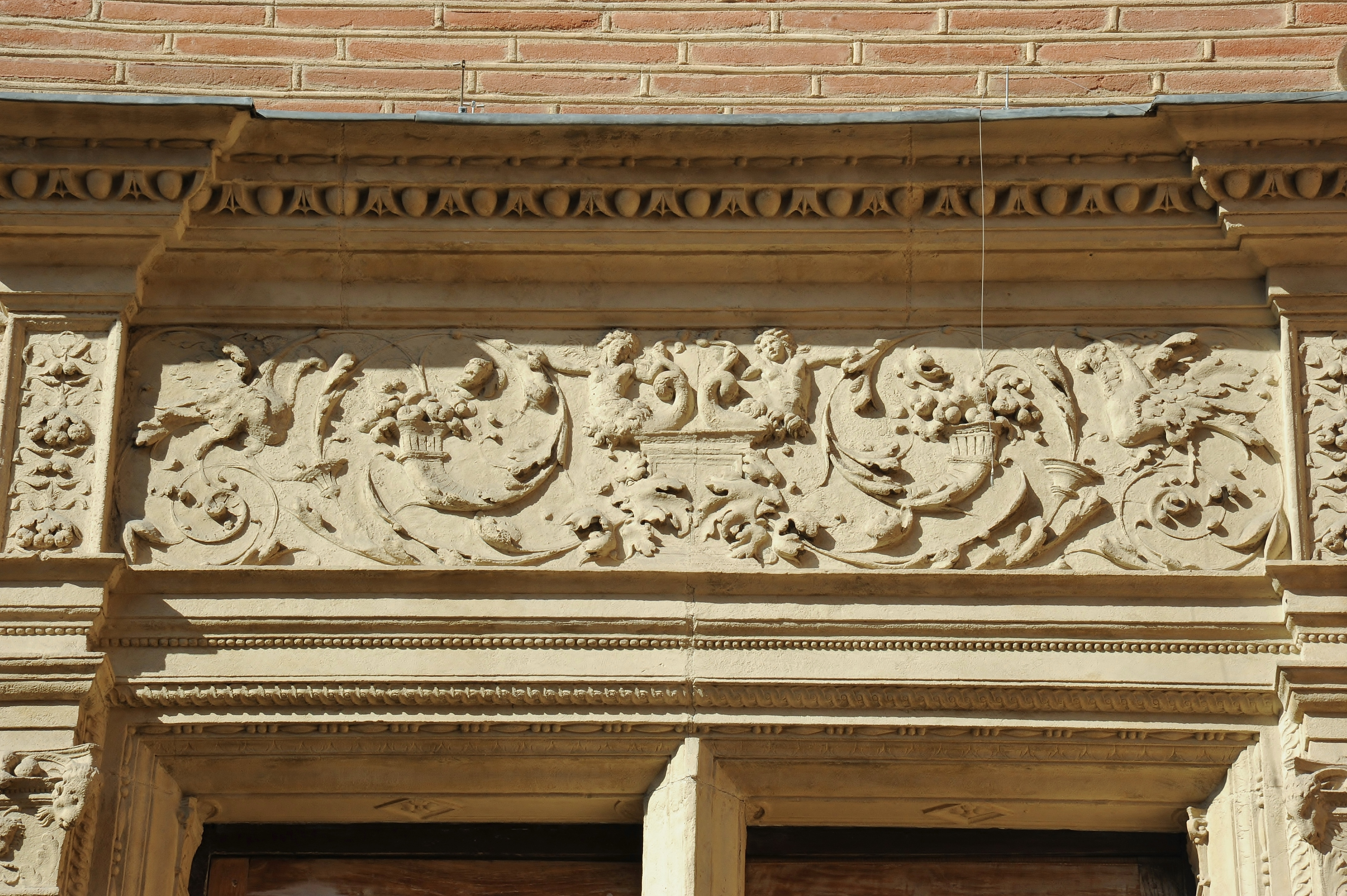
Vieux-Raisin.

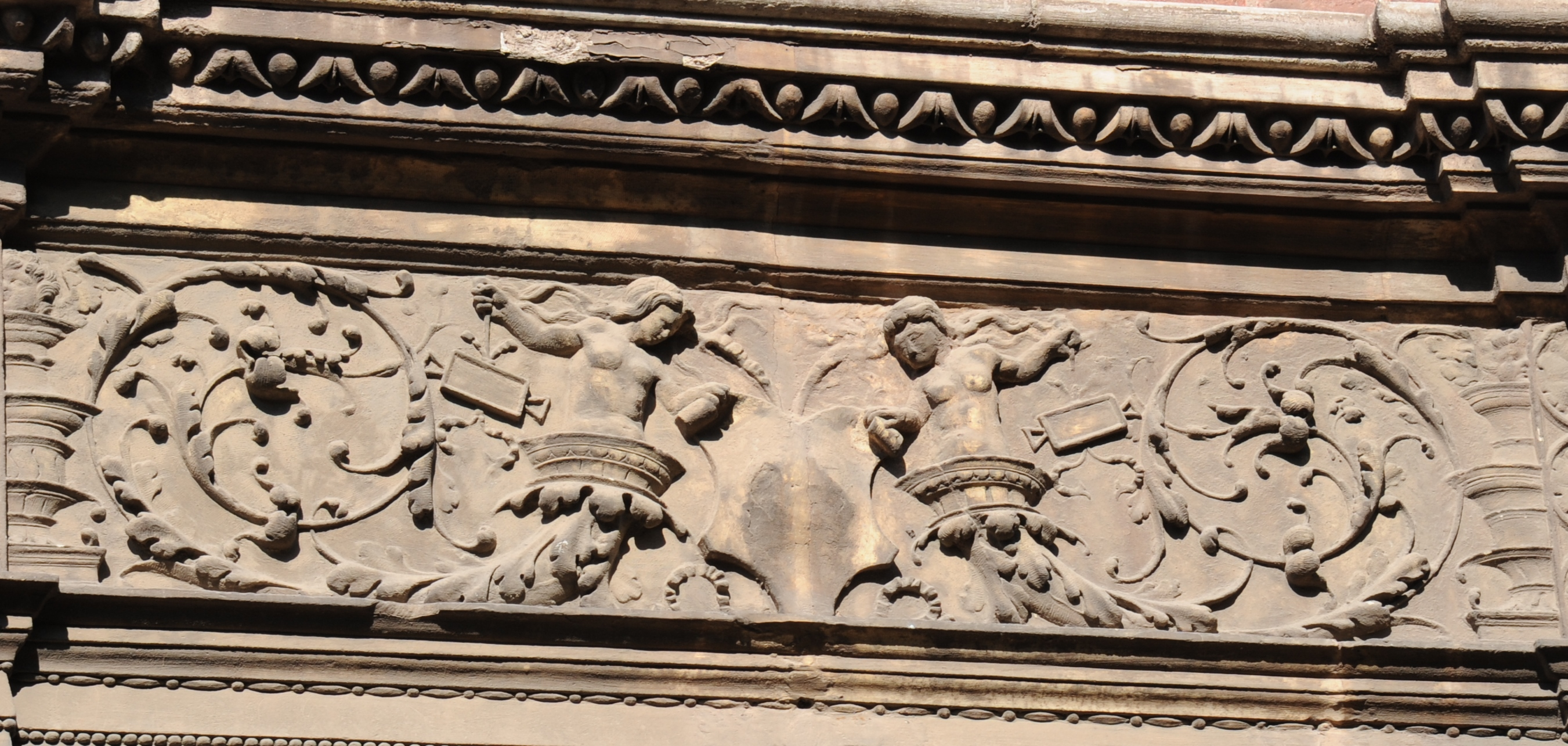
Vieux-Raisin.

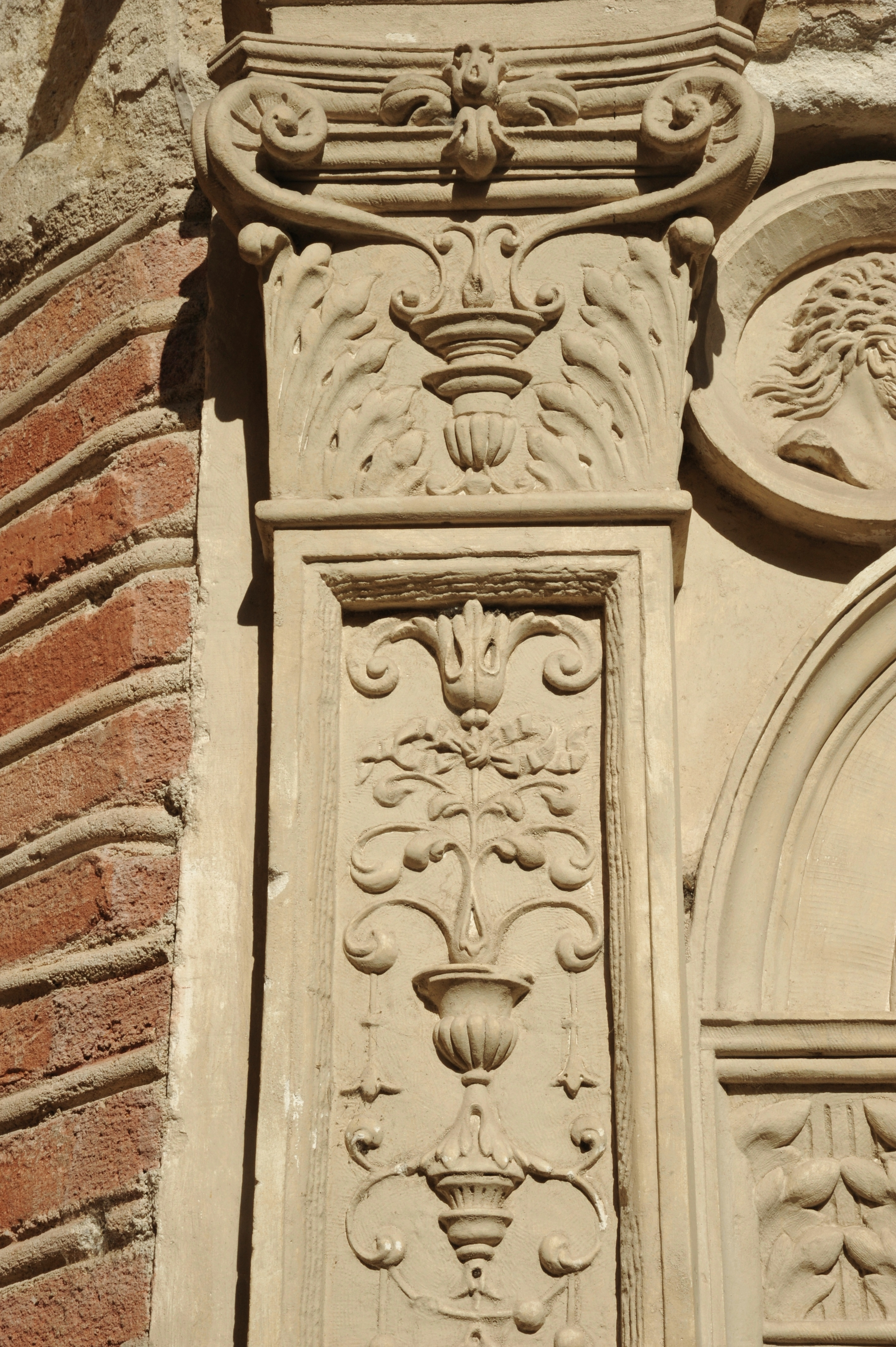
Vieux-Raisin.

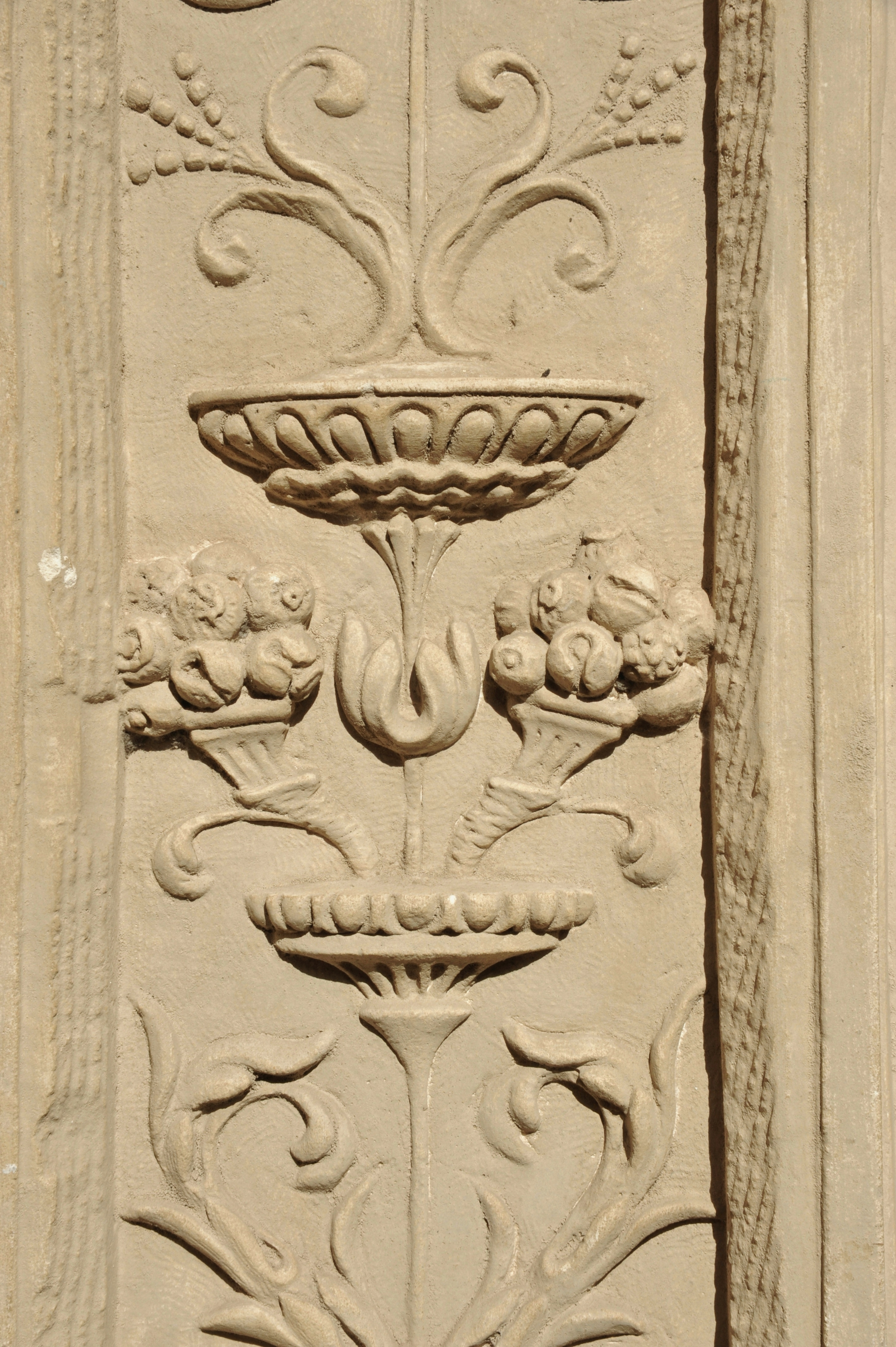
Vieux-Raisin.

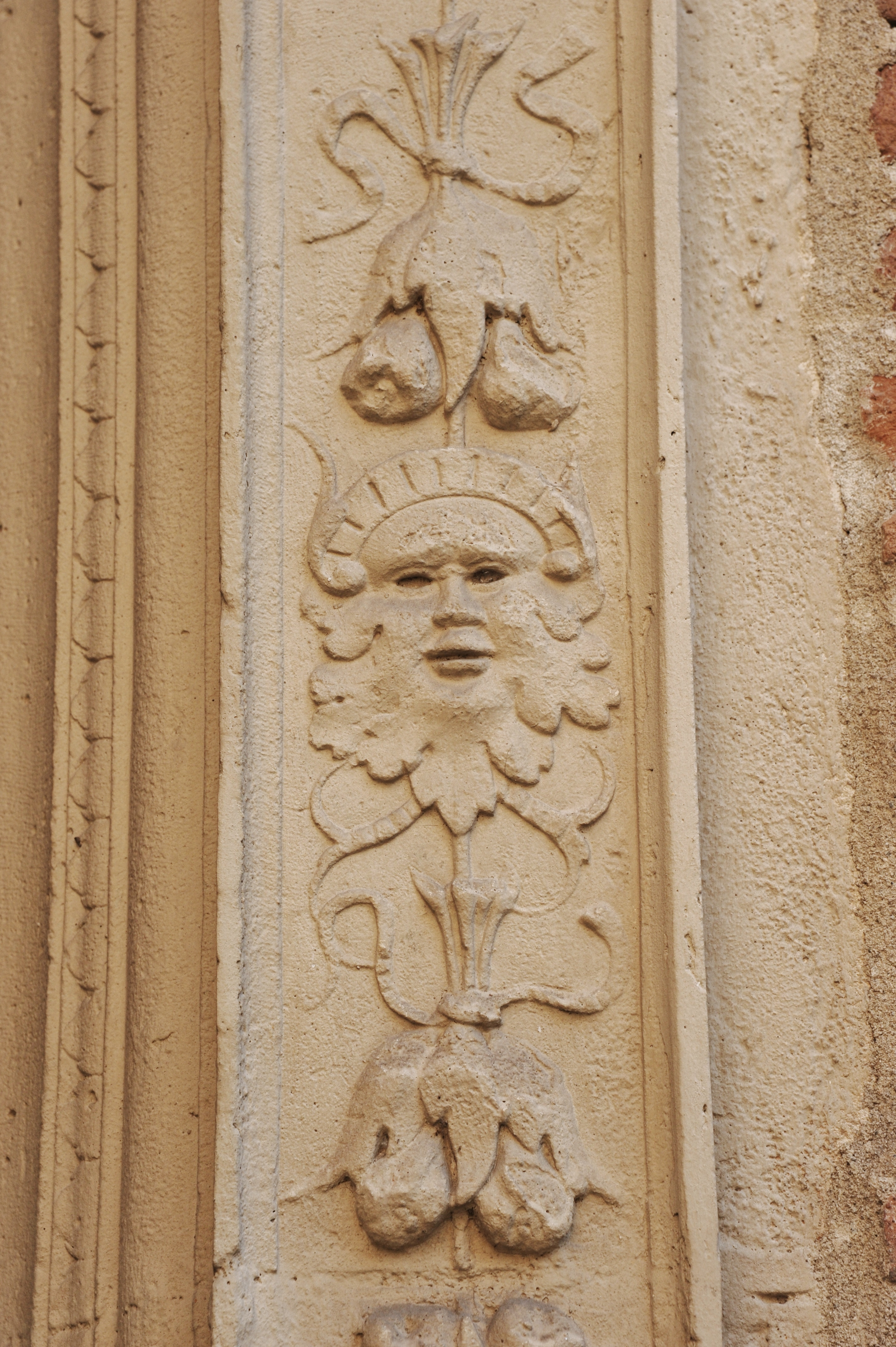
Vieux-Raisin.

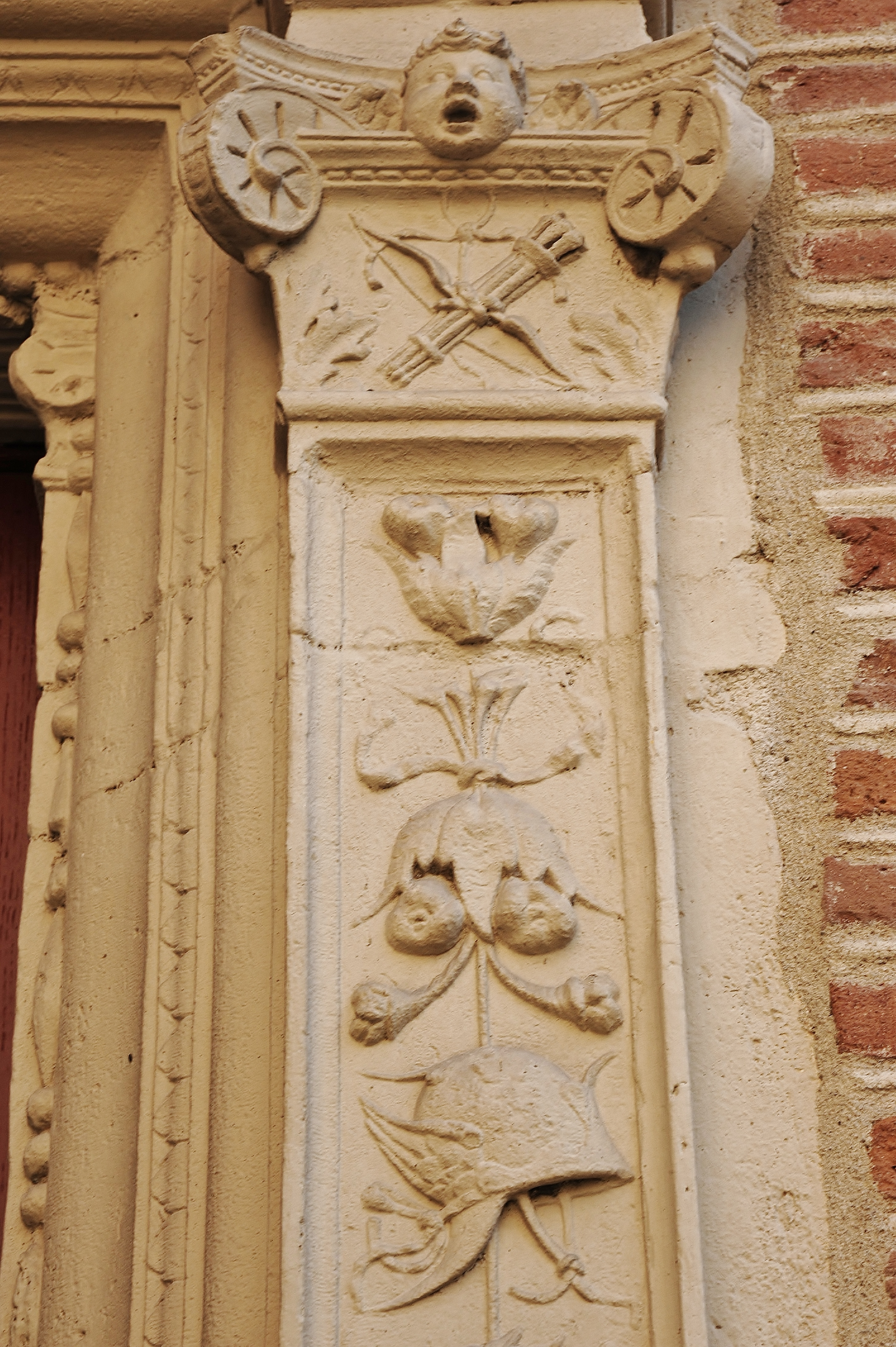
Vieux-Raisin.

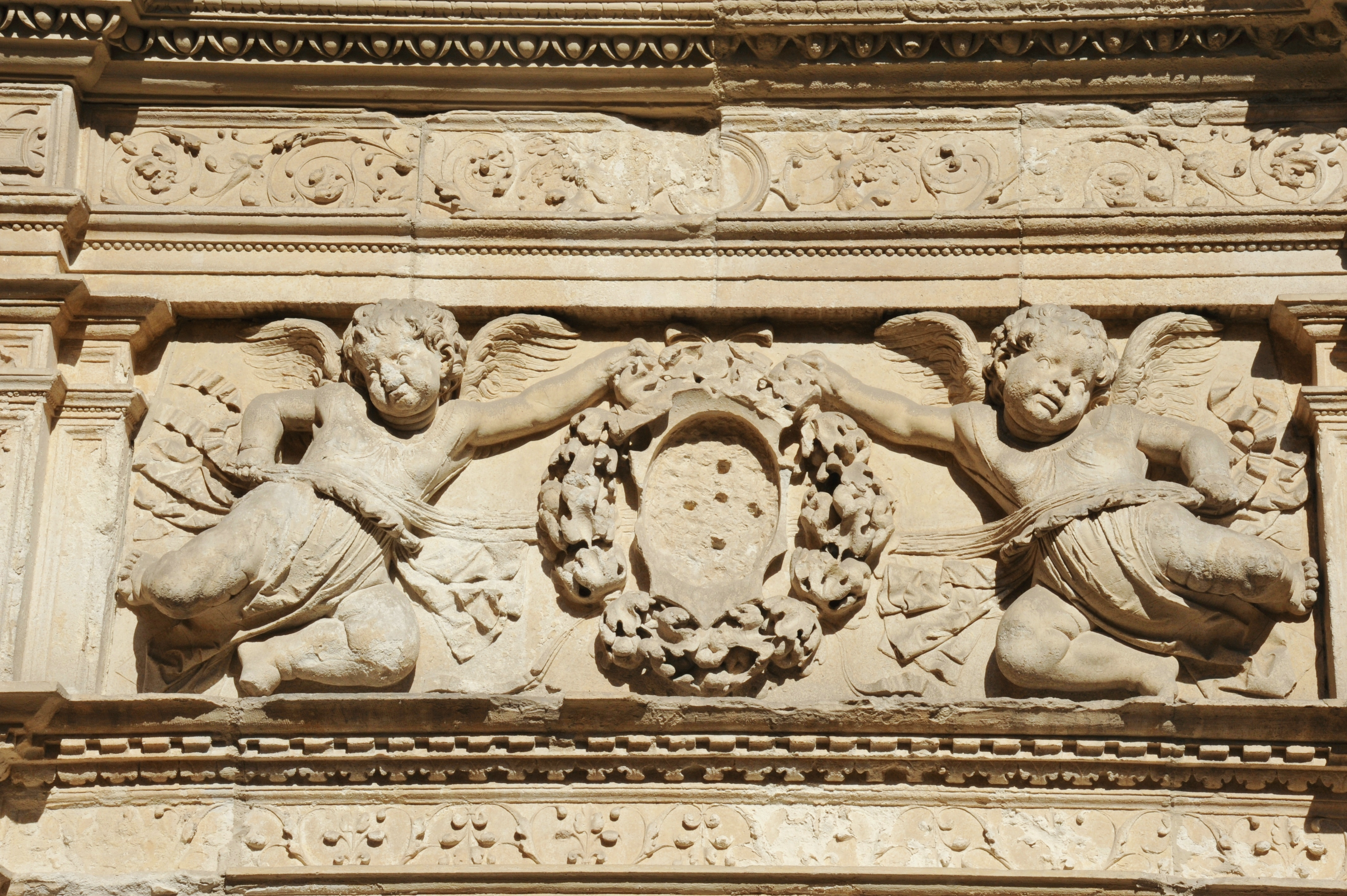
Vieux-Raisin: cherubs (putti).

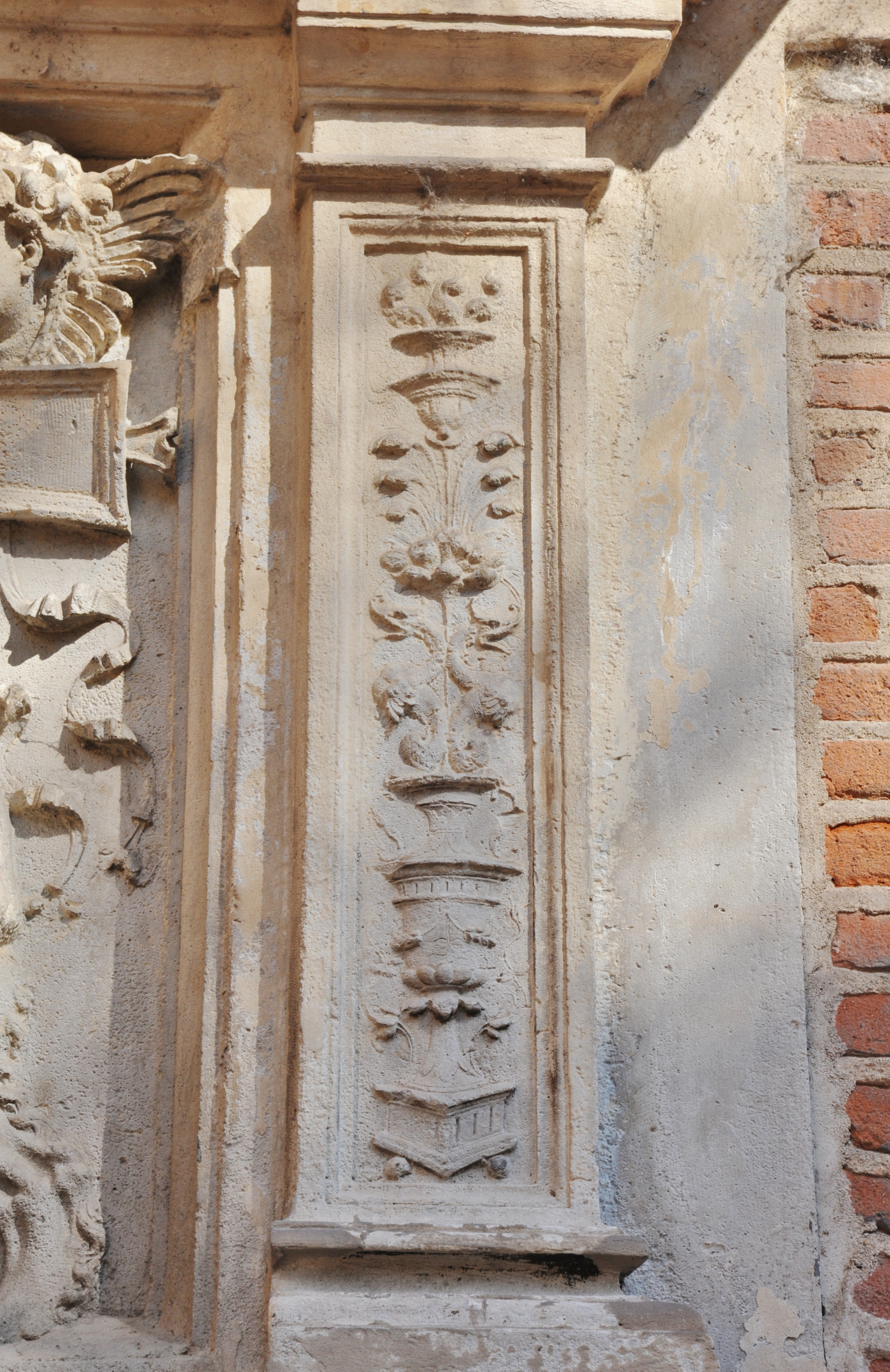
Tournoer.

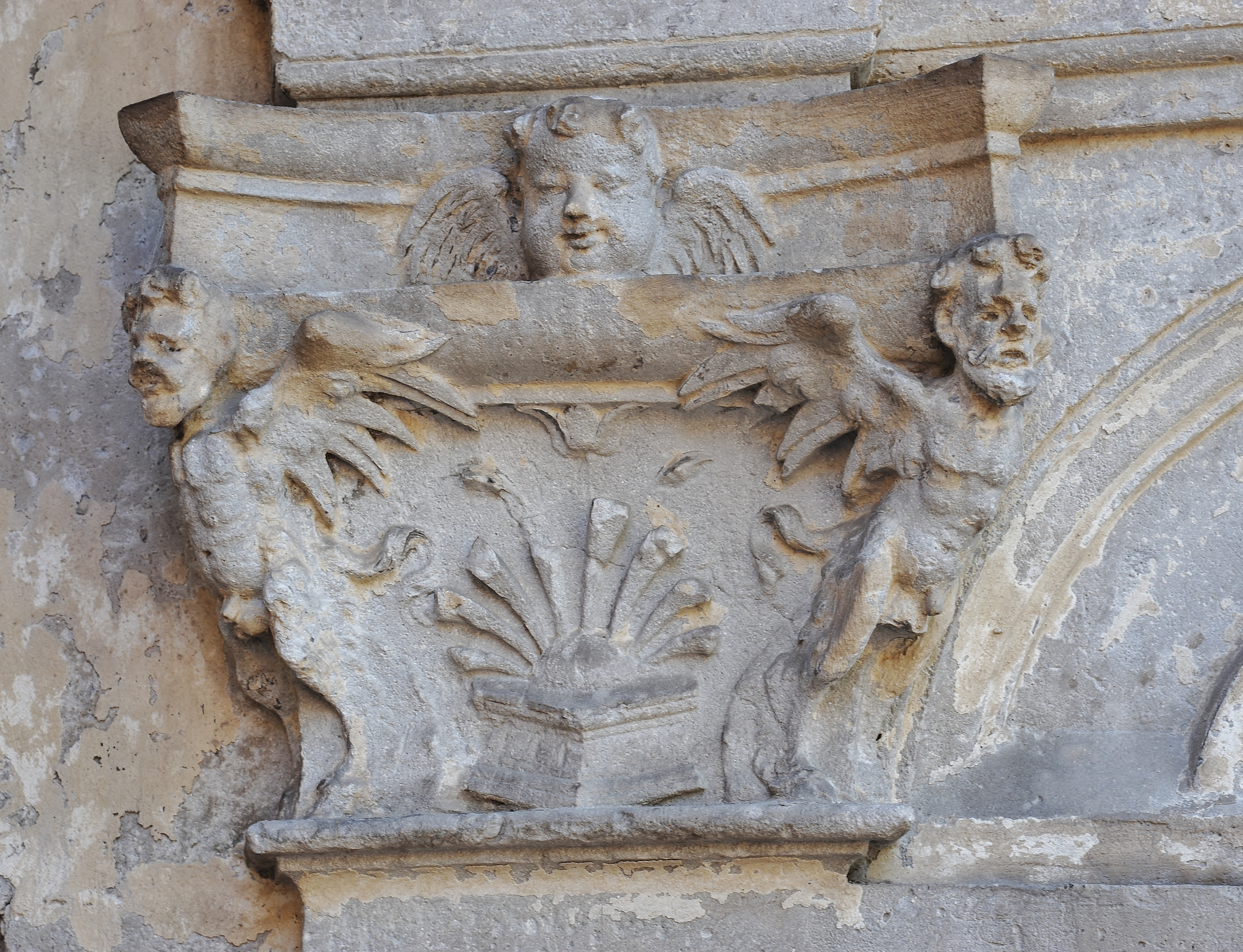
Tournoer: putto.

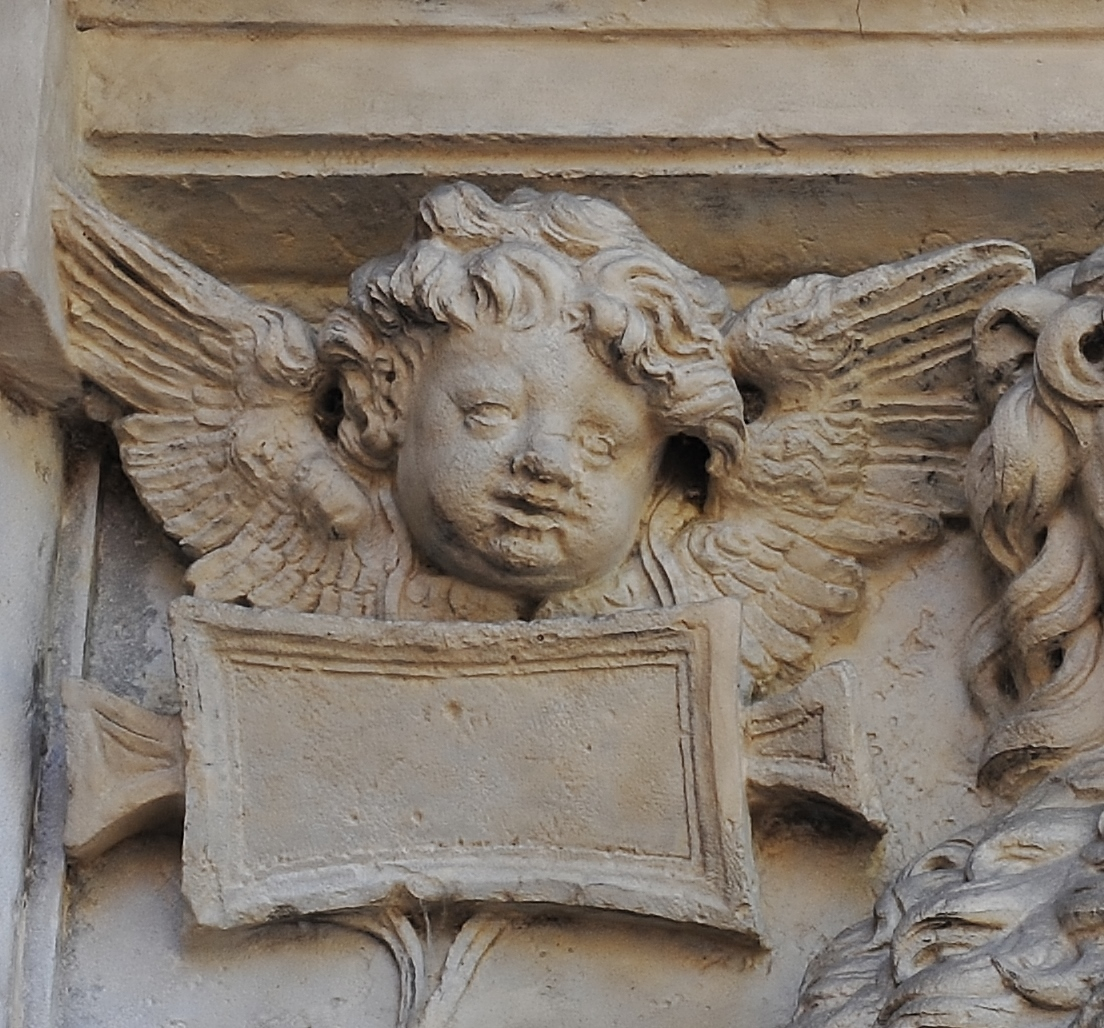
Tournoer: putto.

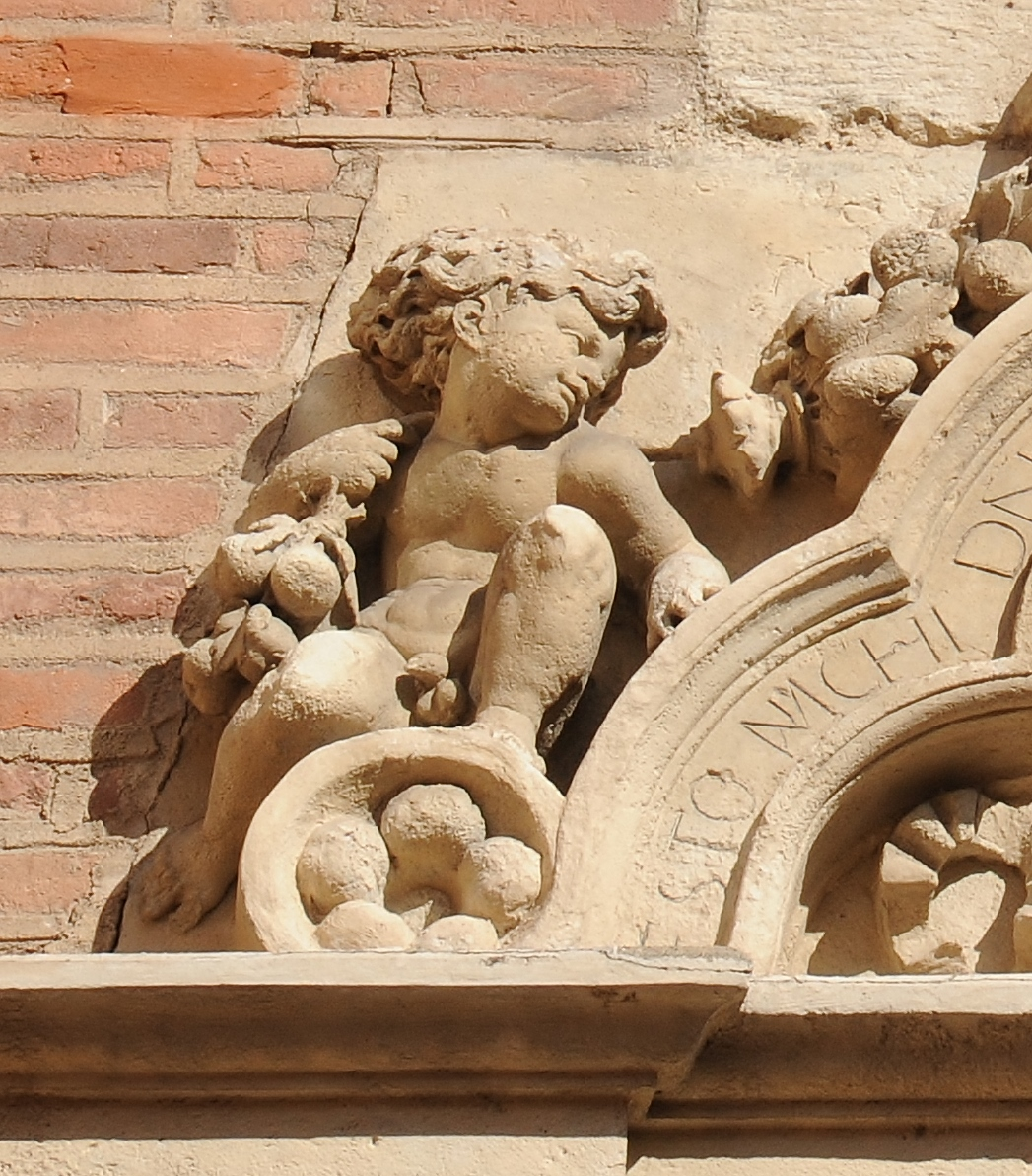
Tournoer: putto and garland.

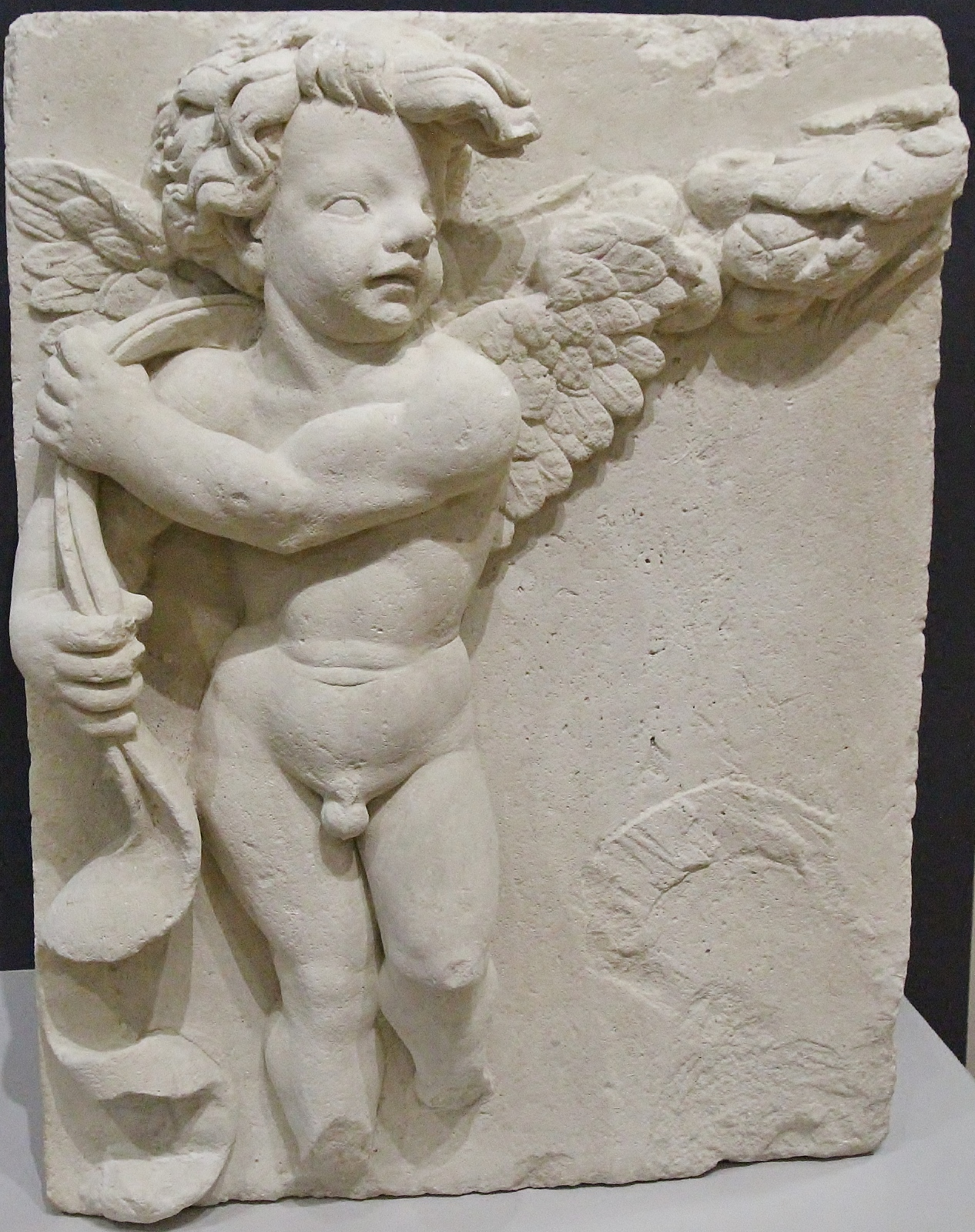
Putto which was part of the "two-faced door" of the former townhouse chapel.

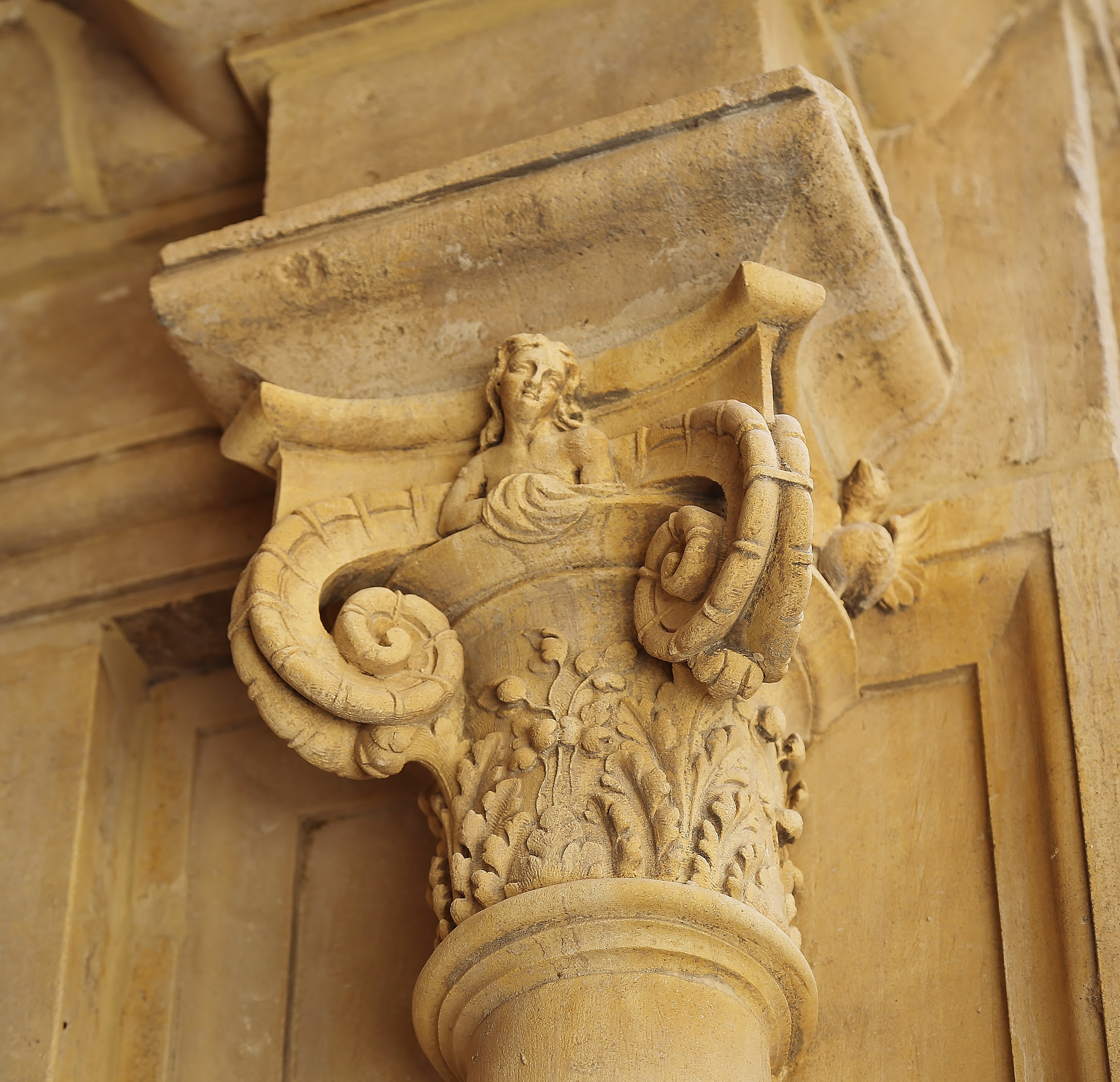
Bernuy: capital.

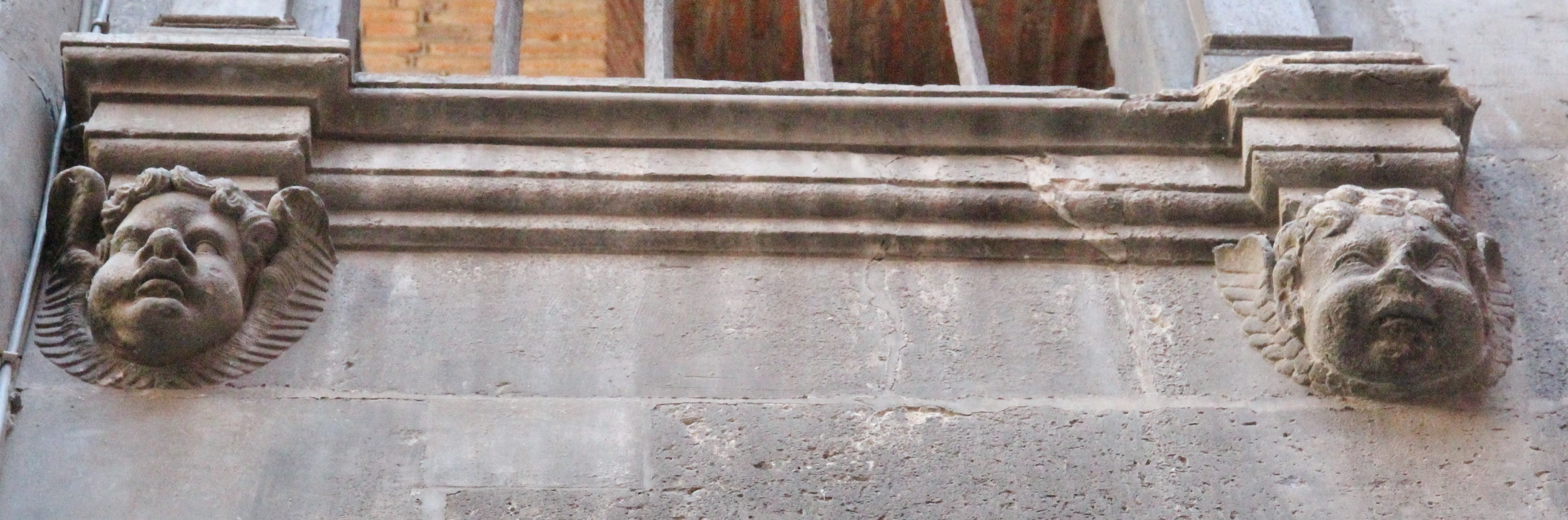
Bernuy: putti.

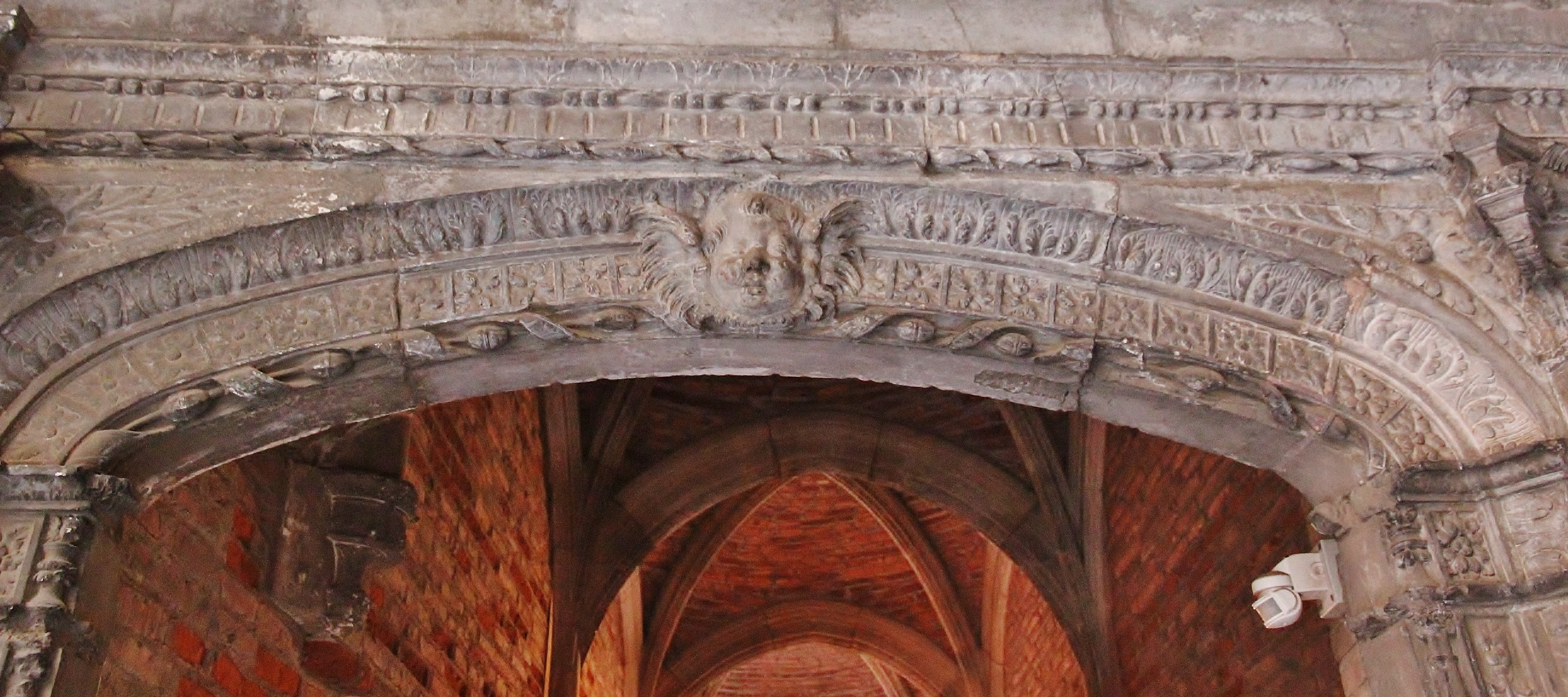
Bernuy: putto, olives.

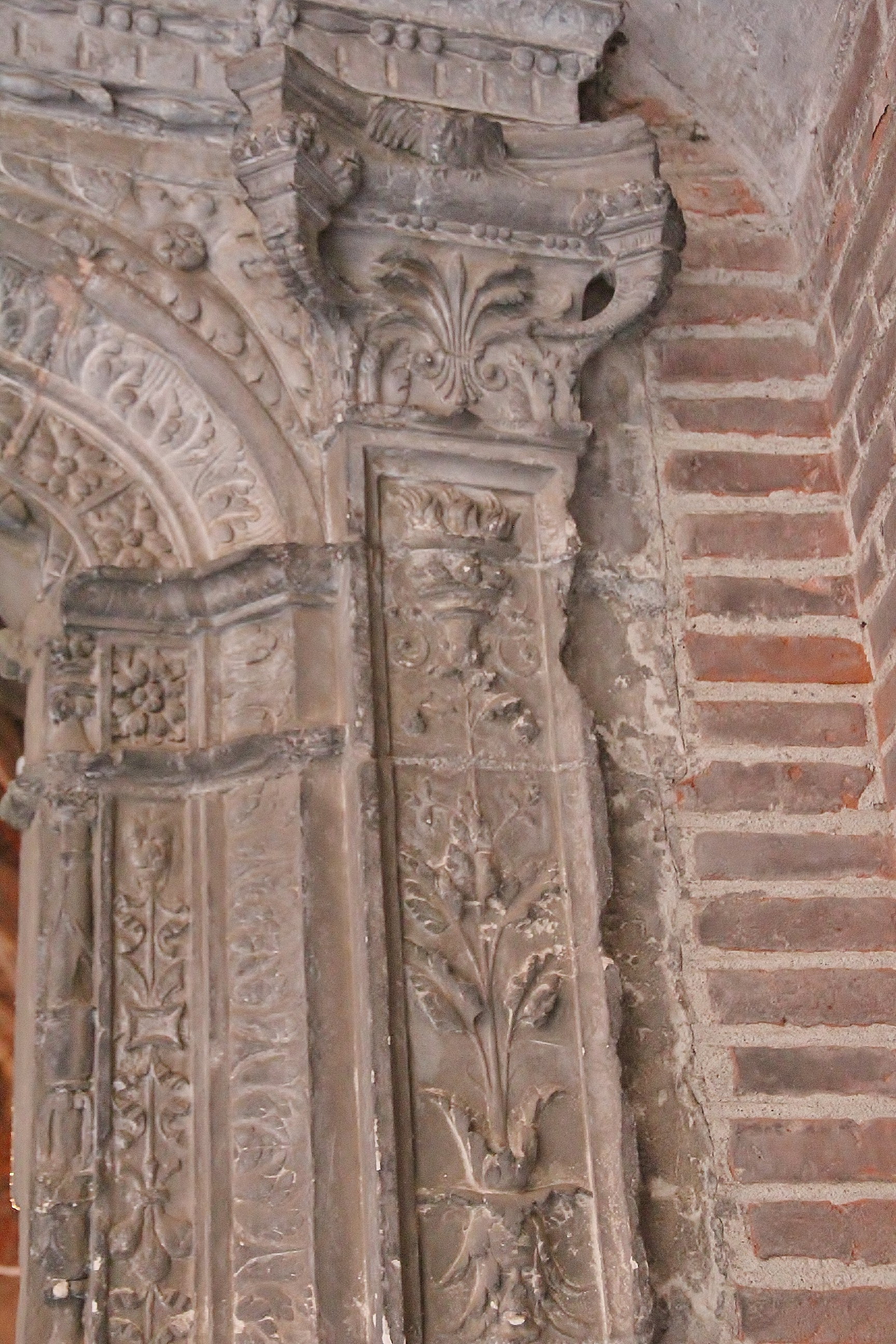
Bernuy: scrolls, horns of plenty.

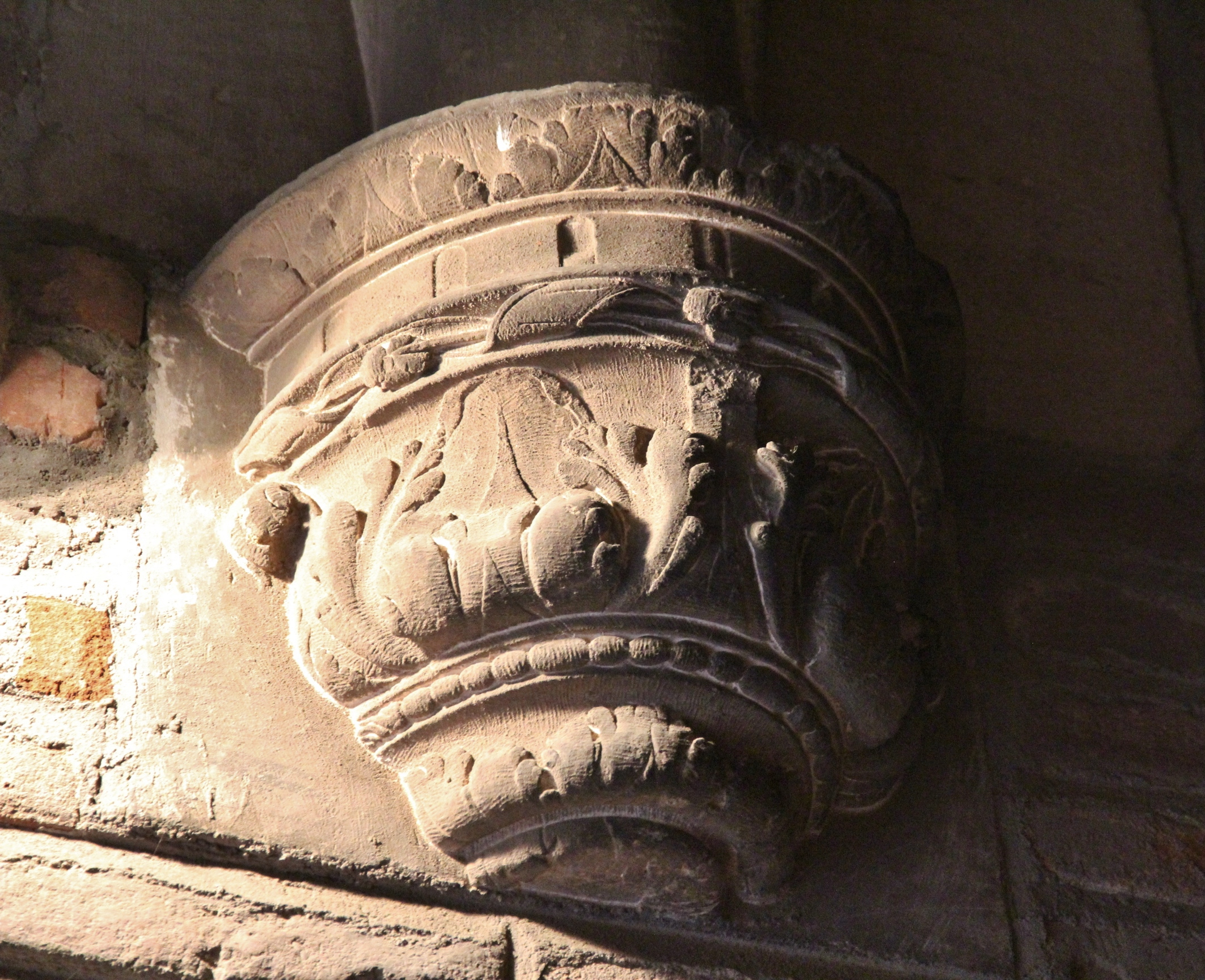
Bernuy: carved base.

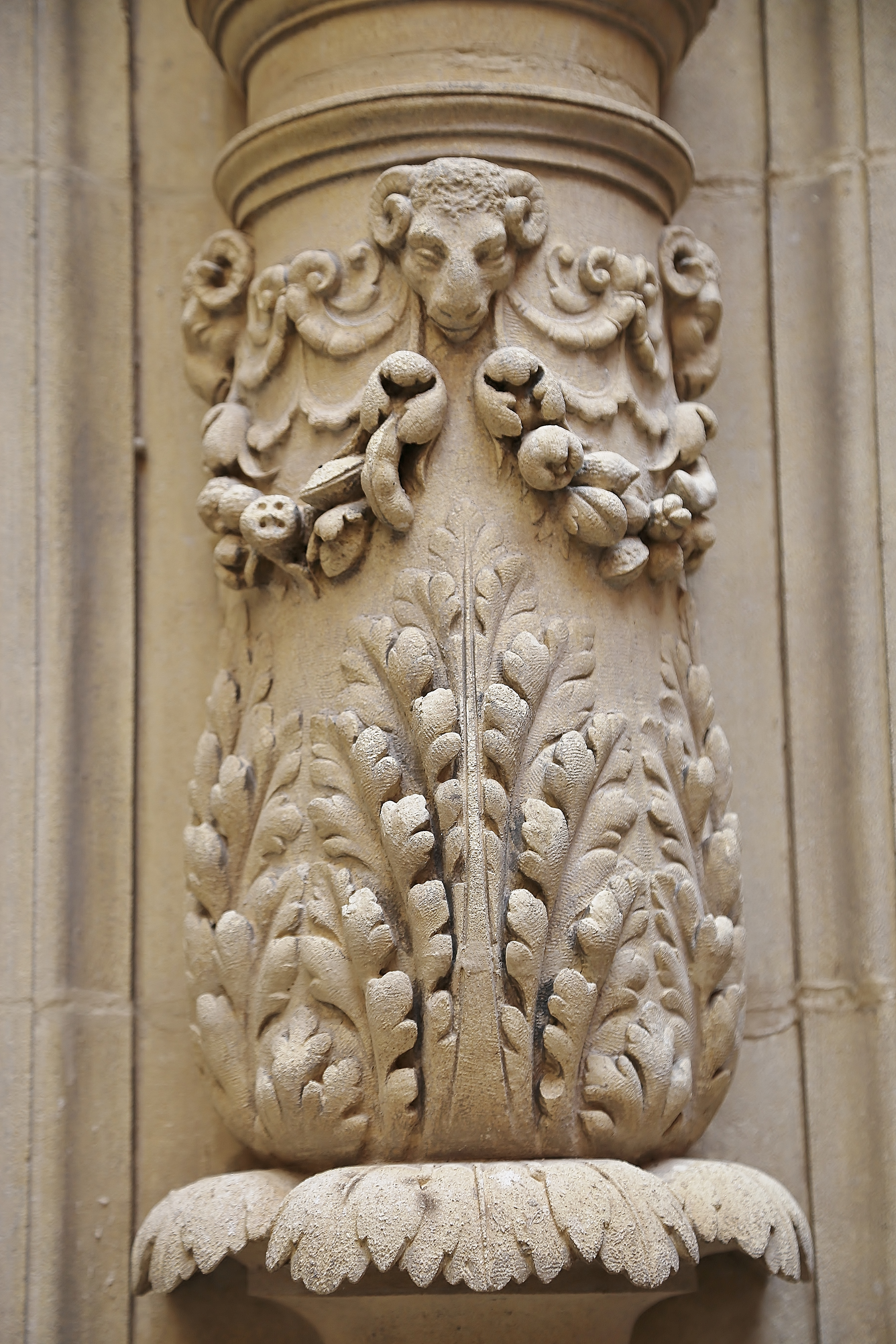
Bernuy: ram's heads and garlands.

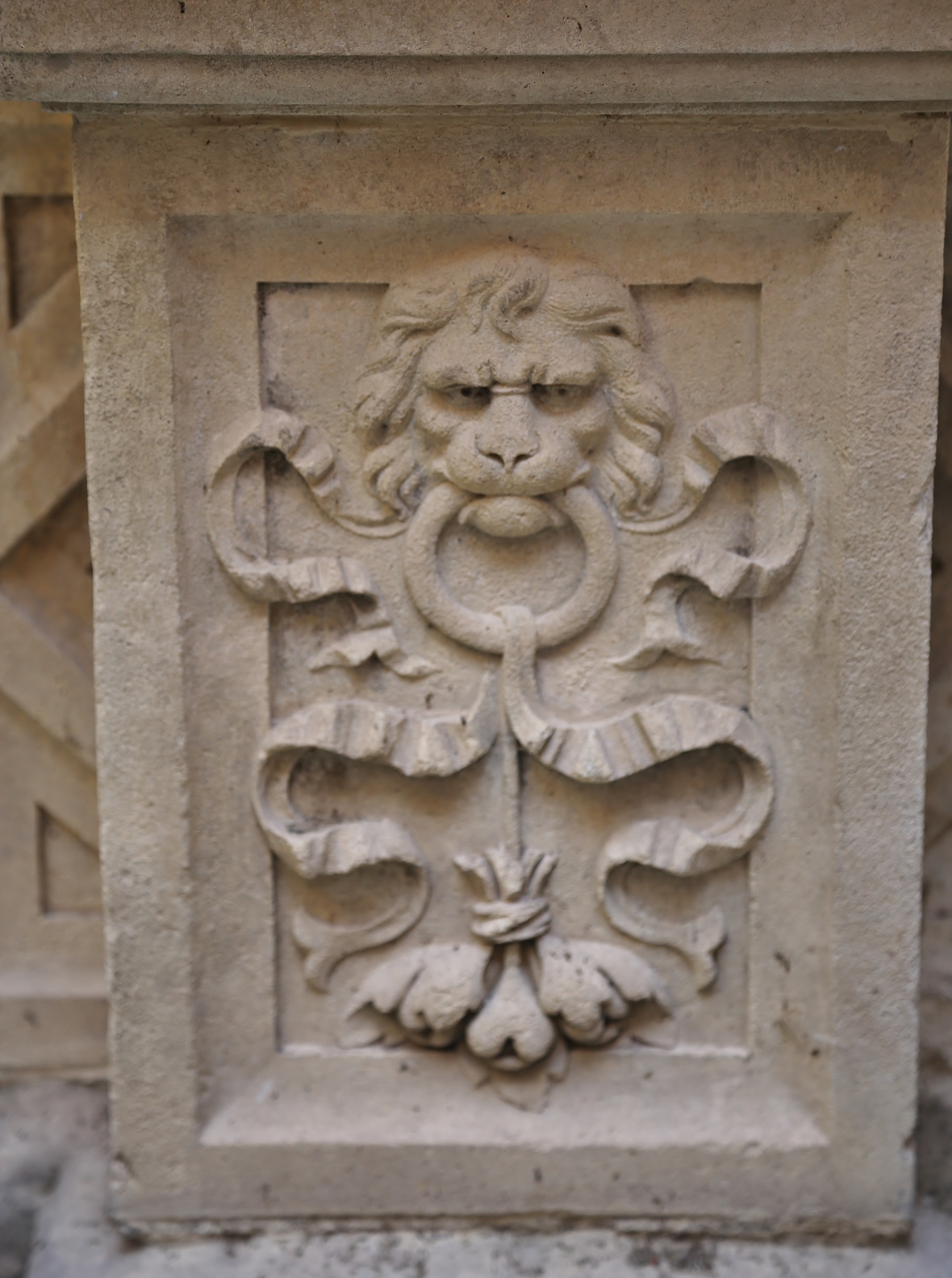
Bernuy: lion mask, ribbons.

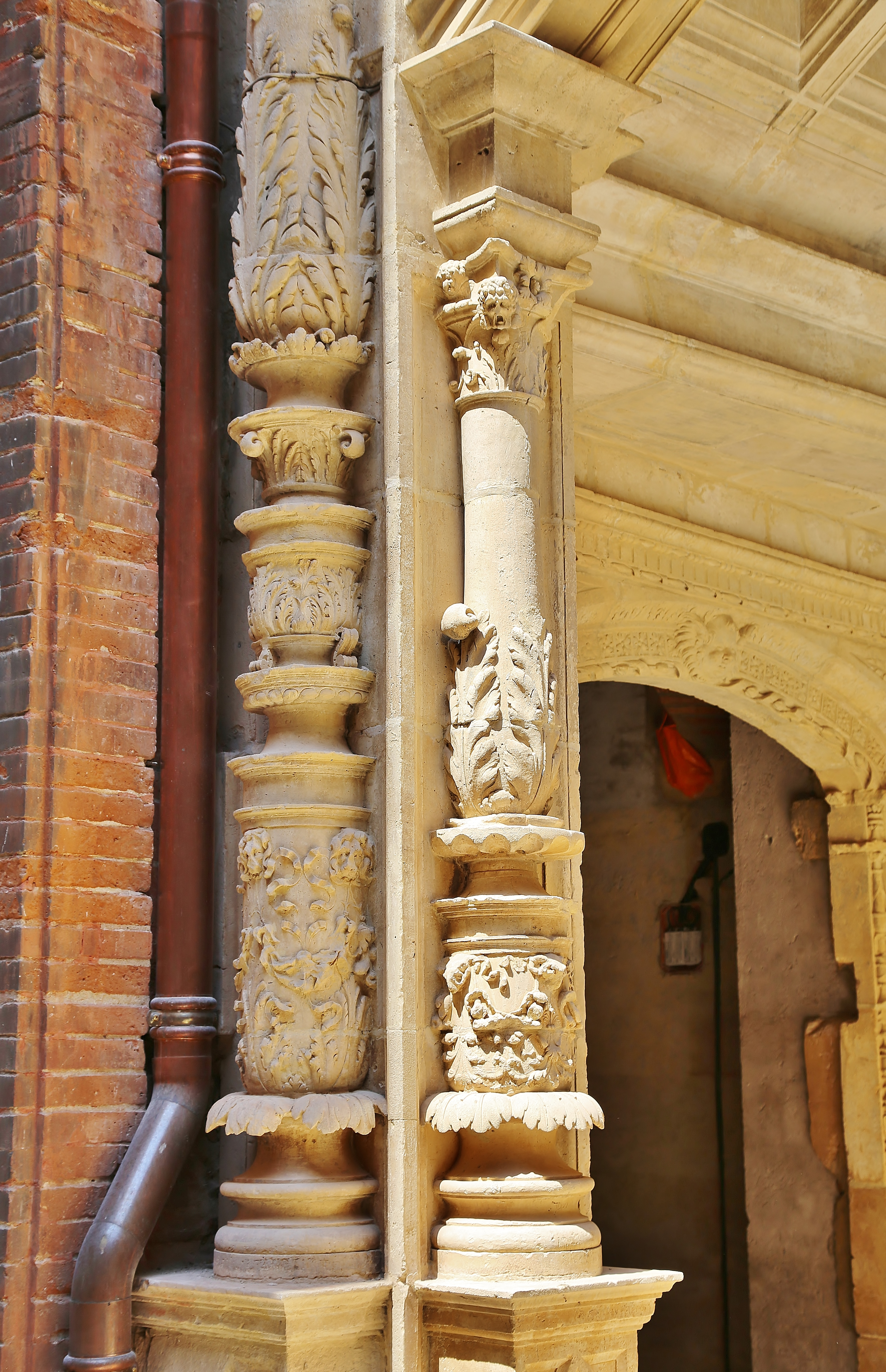
Bernuy: Candelabra columns.

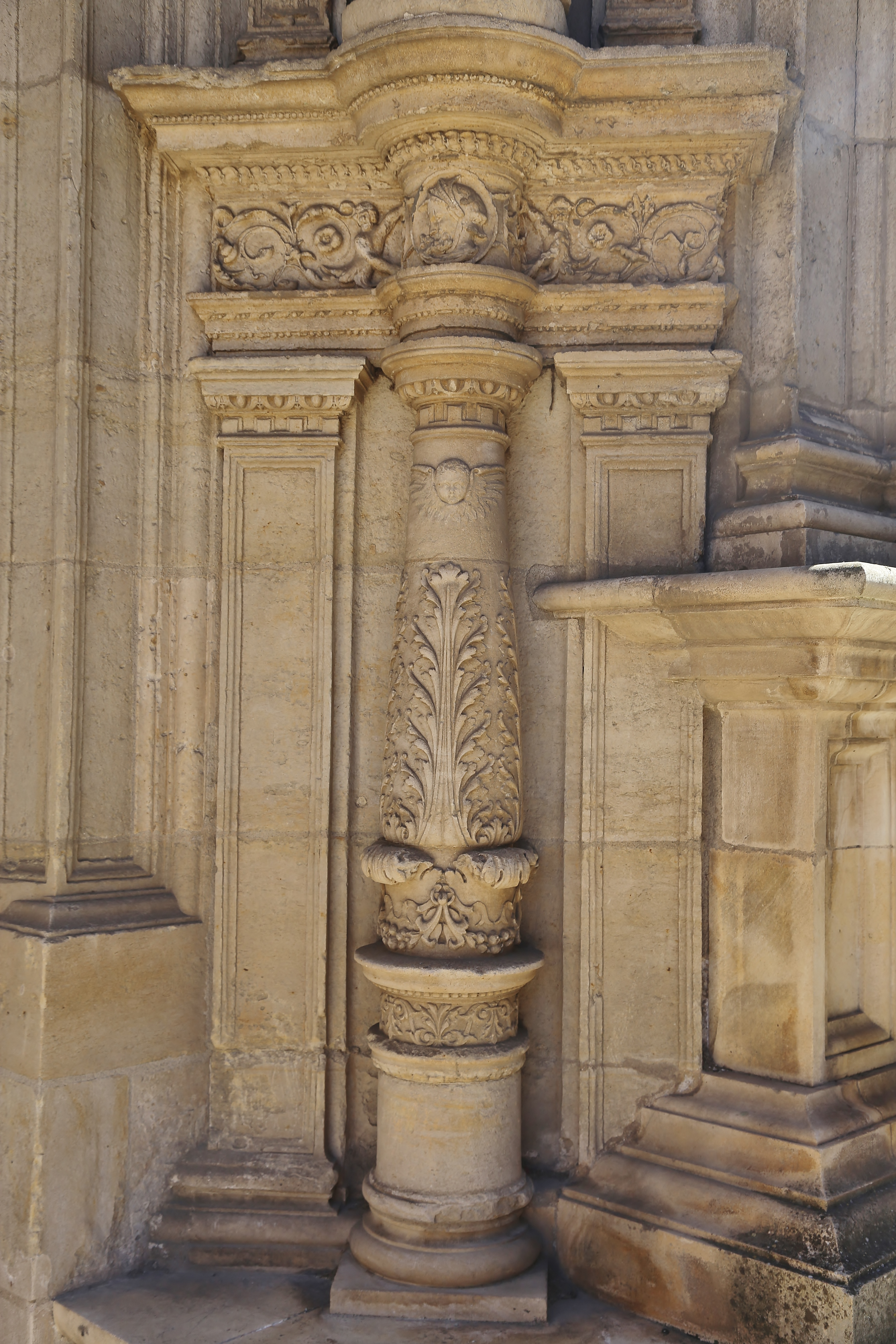
Dalbade church: Candelabra column.

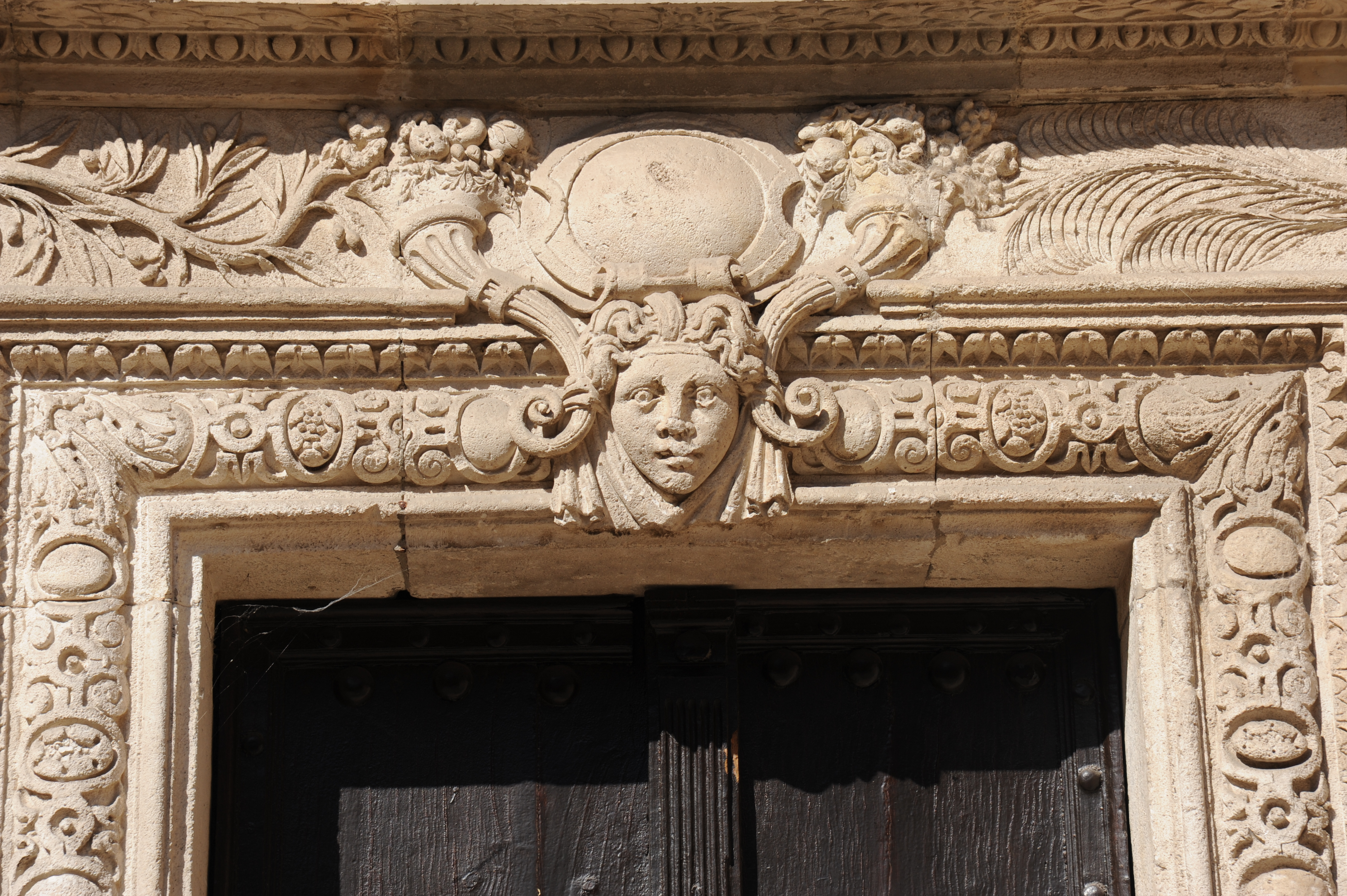
Assézat: carved lintel with horns of plenty.

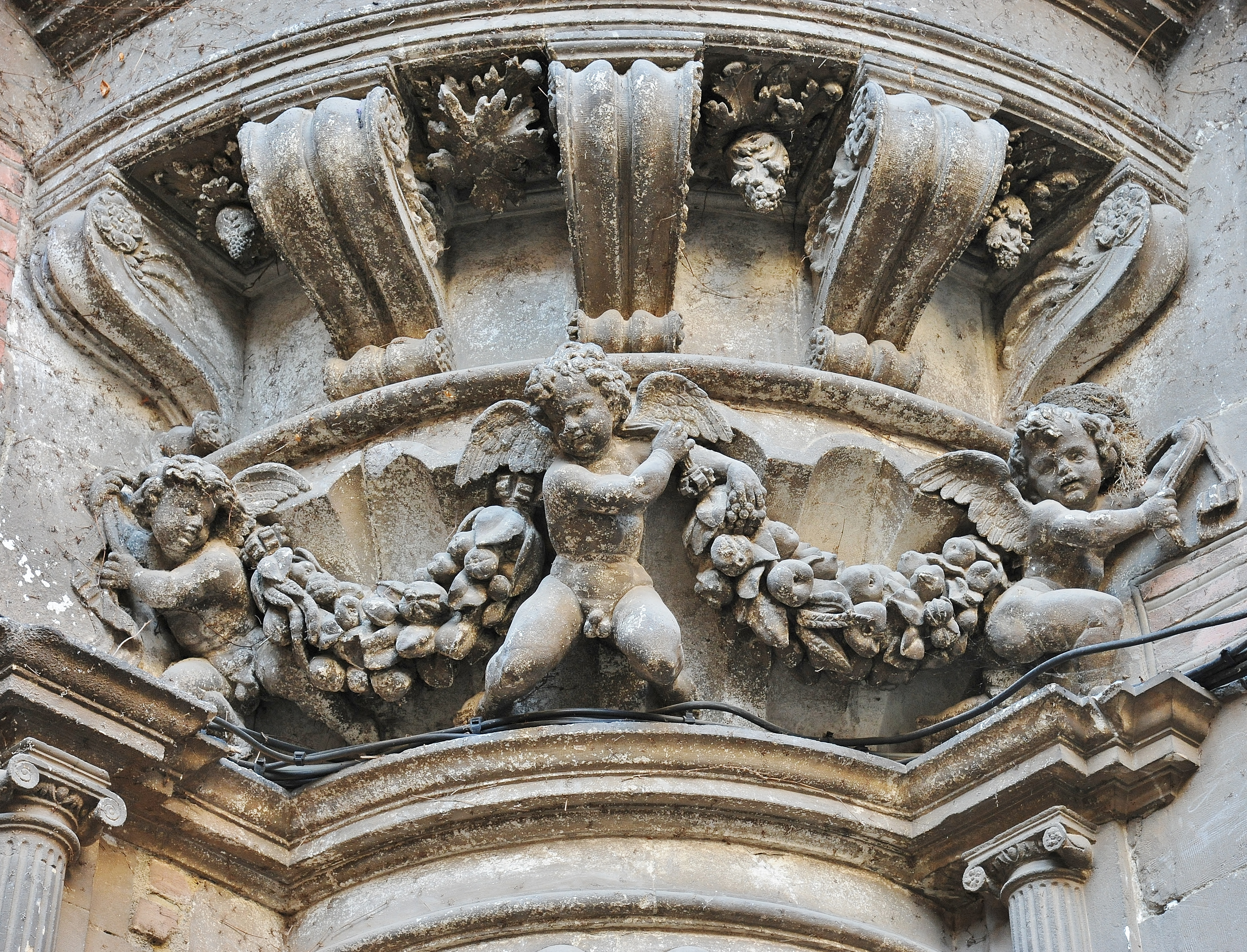
Molinier: putti and garland of plenty.

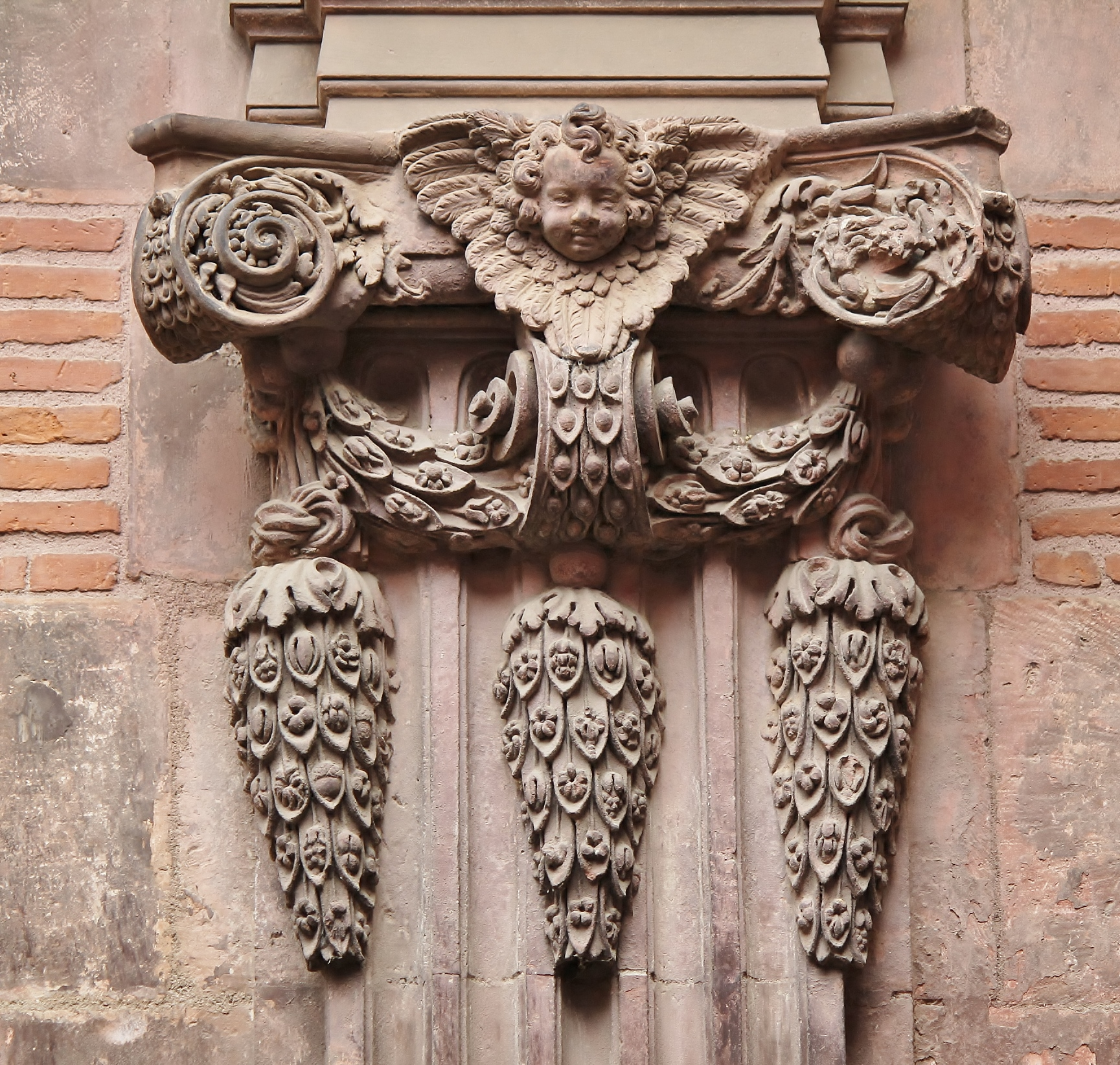
Clary: putto and garland.

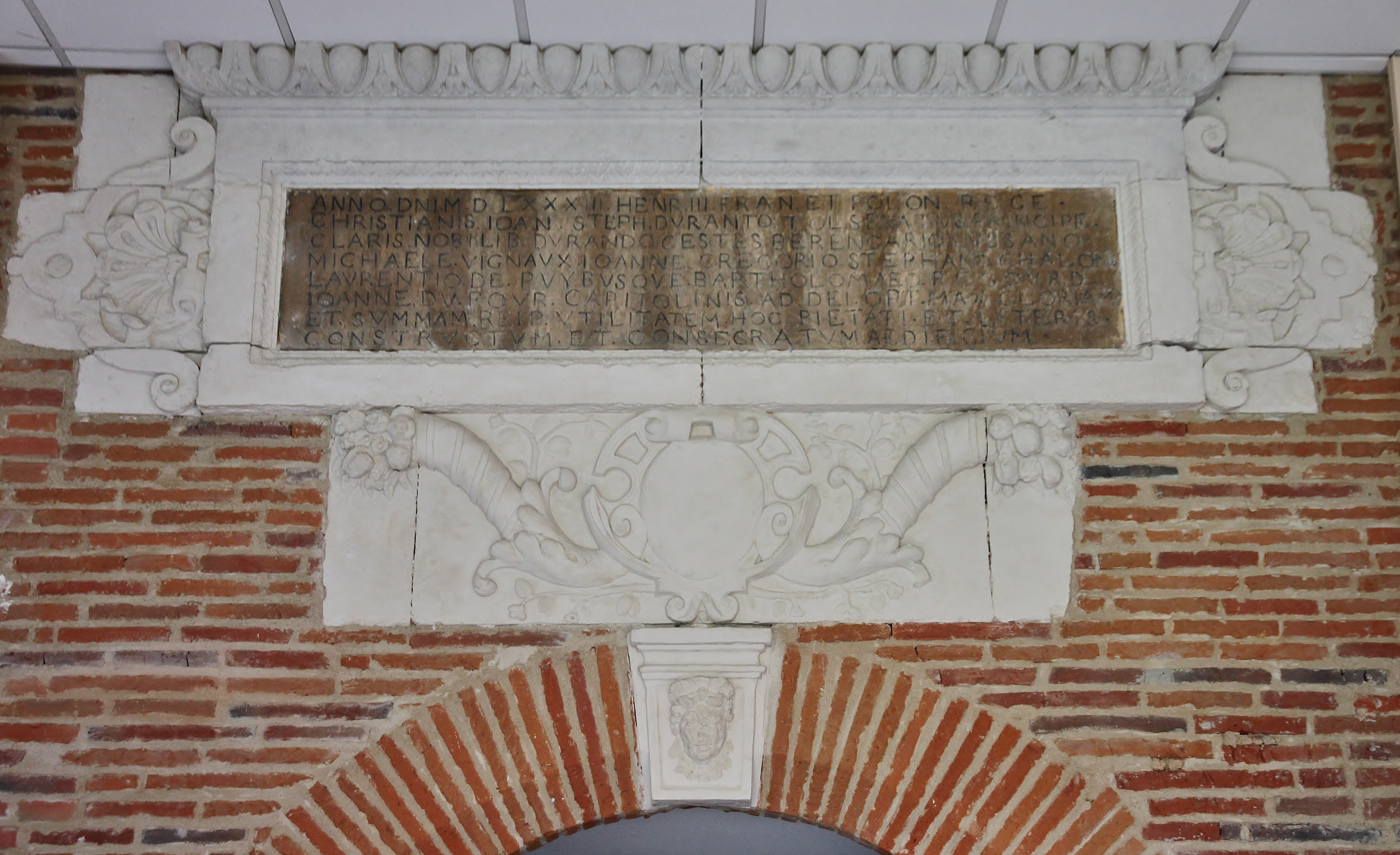
Stele of the former college of Esquile.

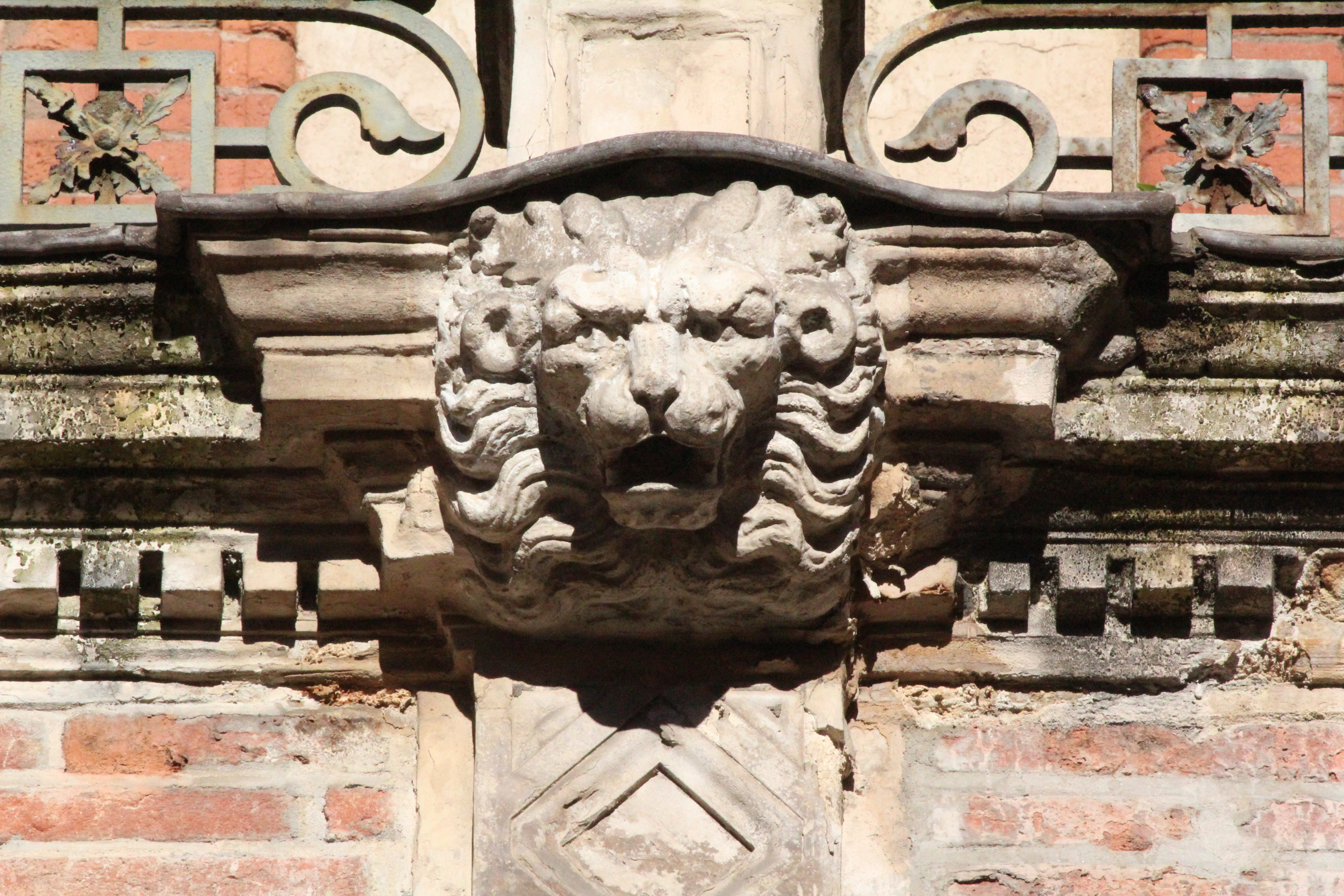
Pins: lion mufles once used as a gargoyle.

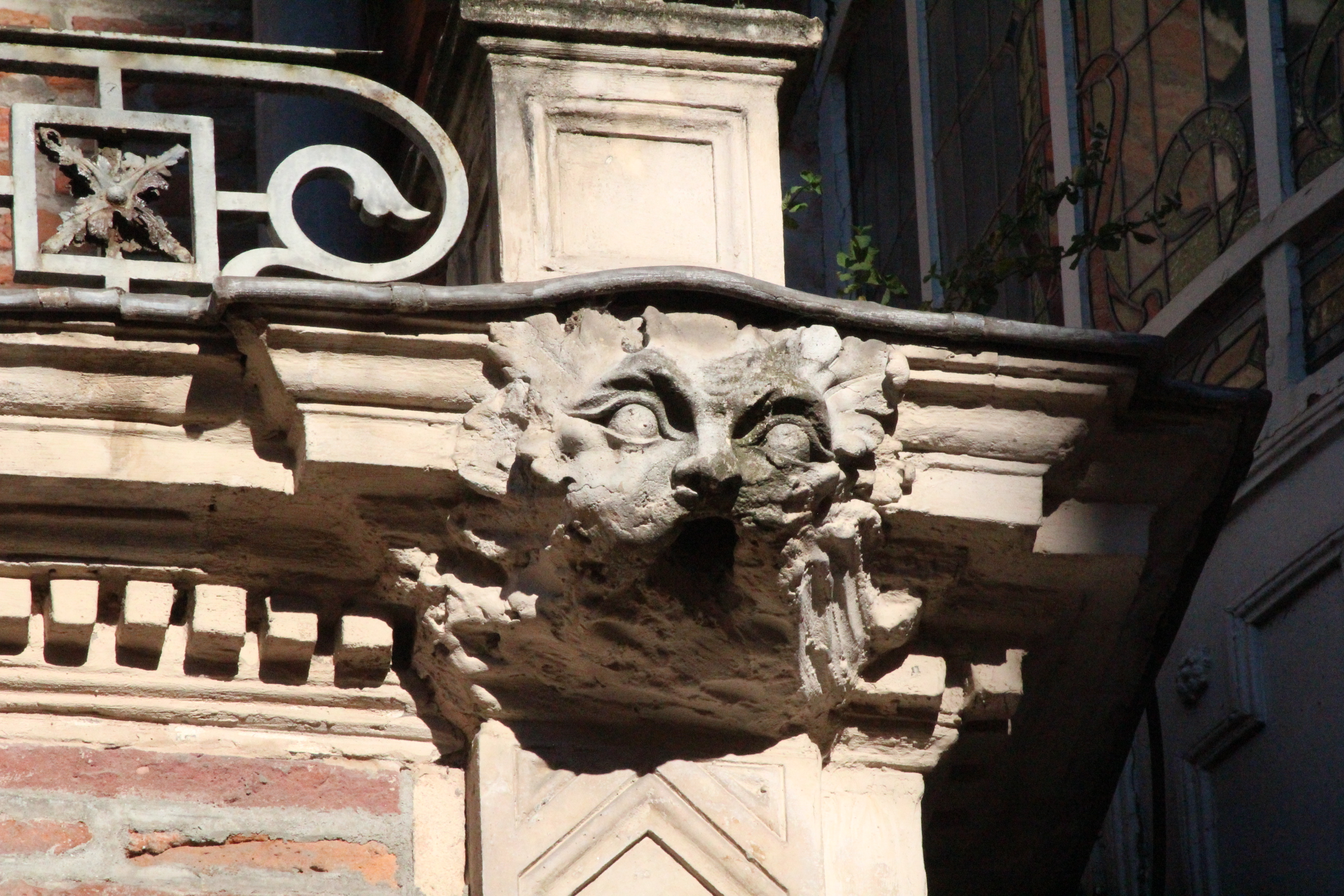
Pins: lion mufles / gargoyle.

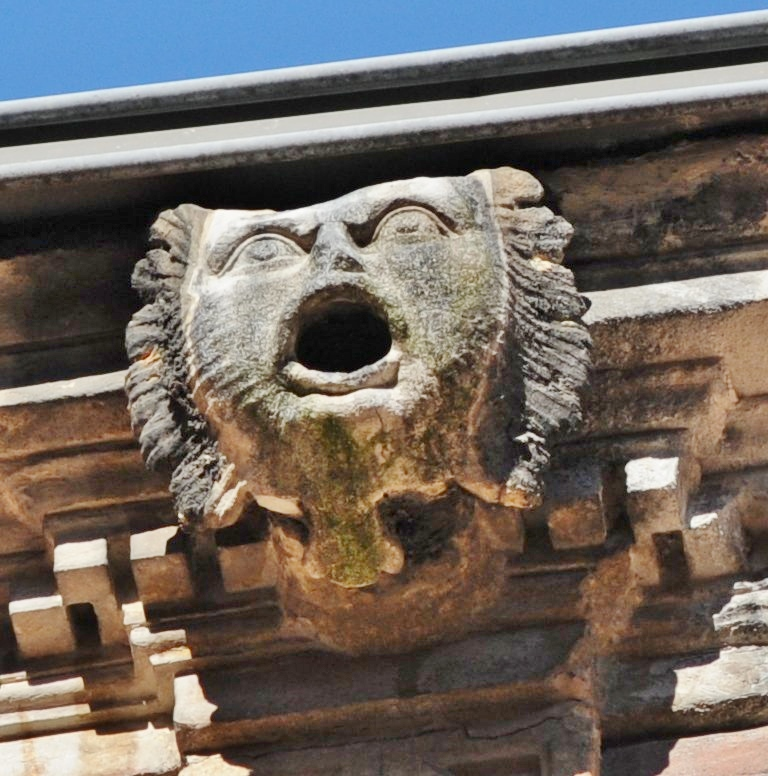
Thomas de Montval: lion mufles / gargoyle (provenance: hôtel de Pins).

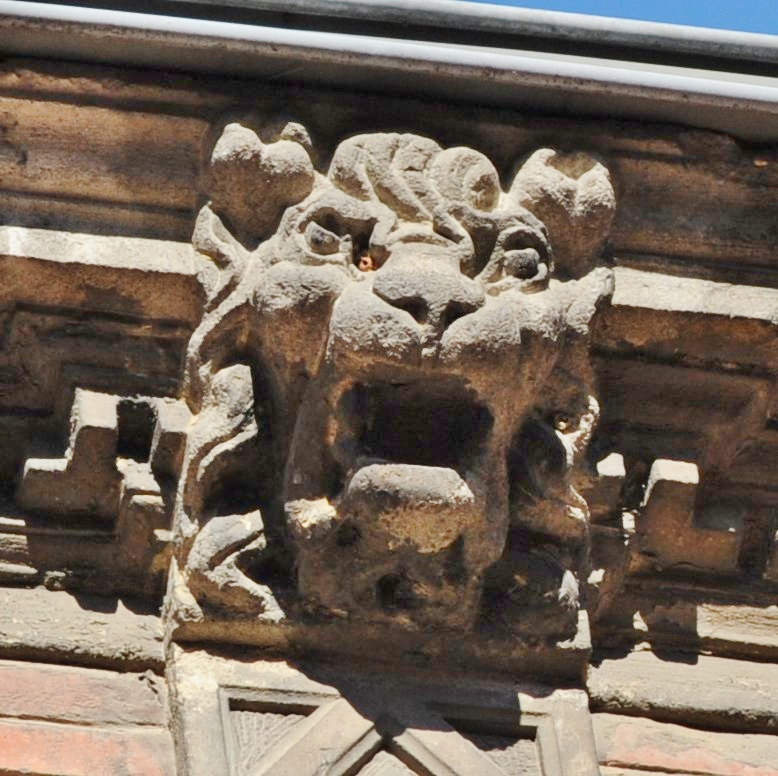
Thomas de Montval: lion mufles / gargoyle (provenance: hôtel de Pins).

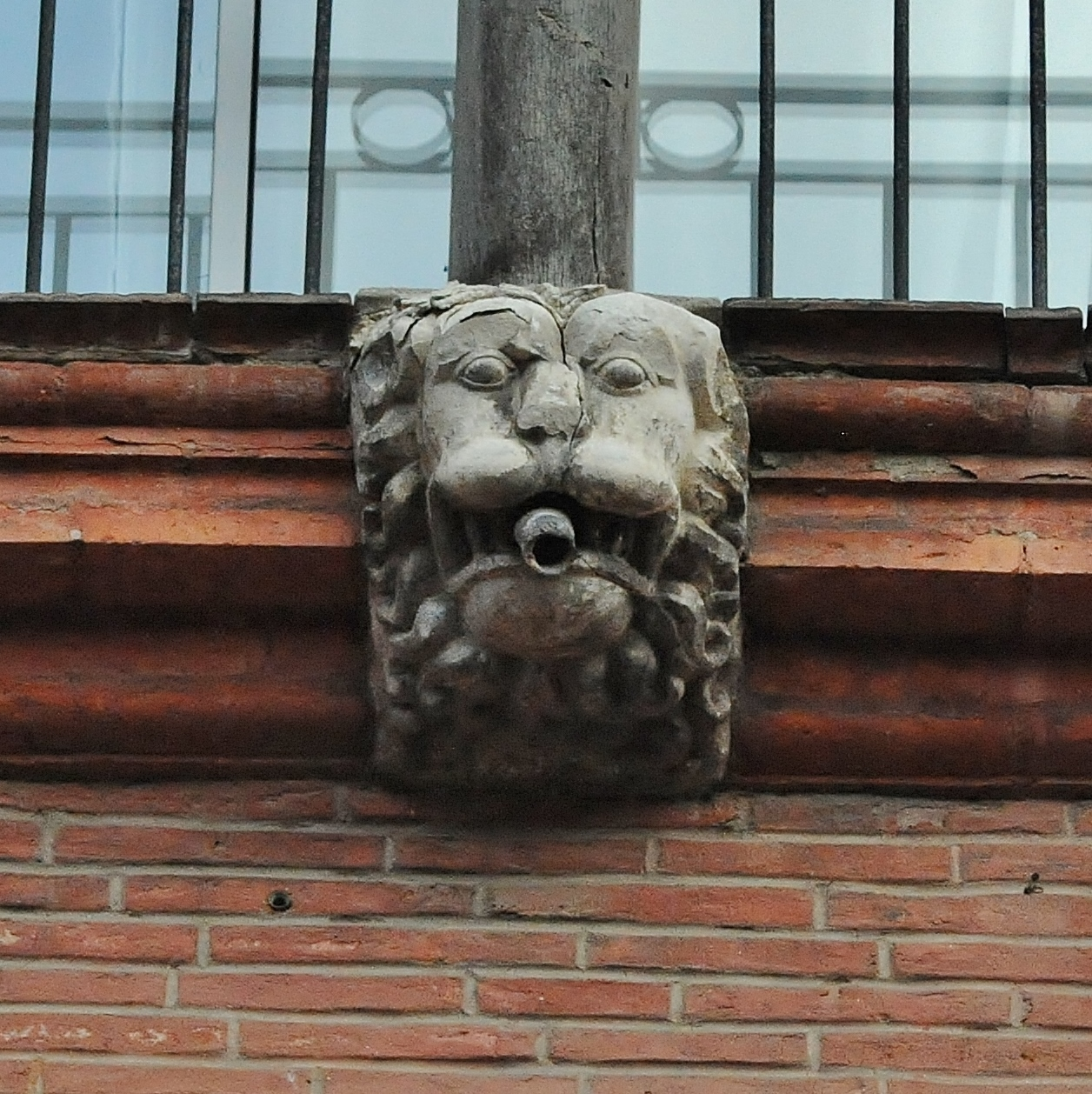
Tiffy: lion mufles / gargoyle.

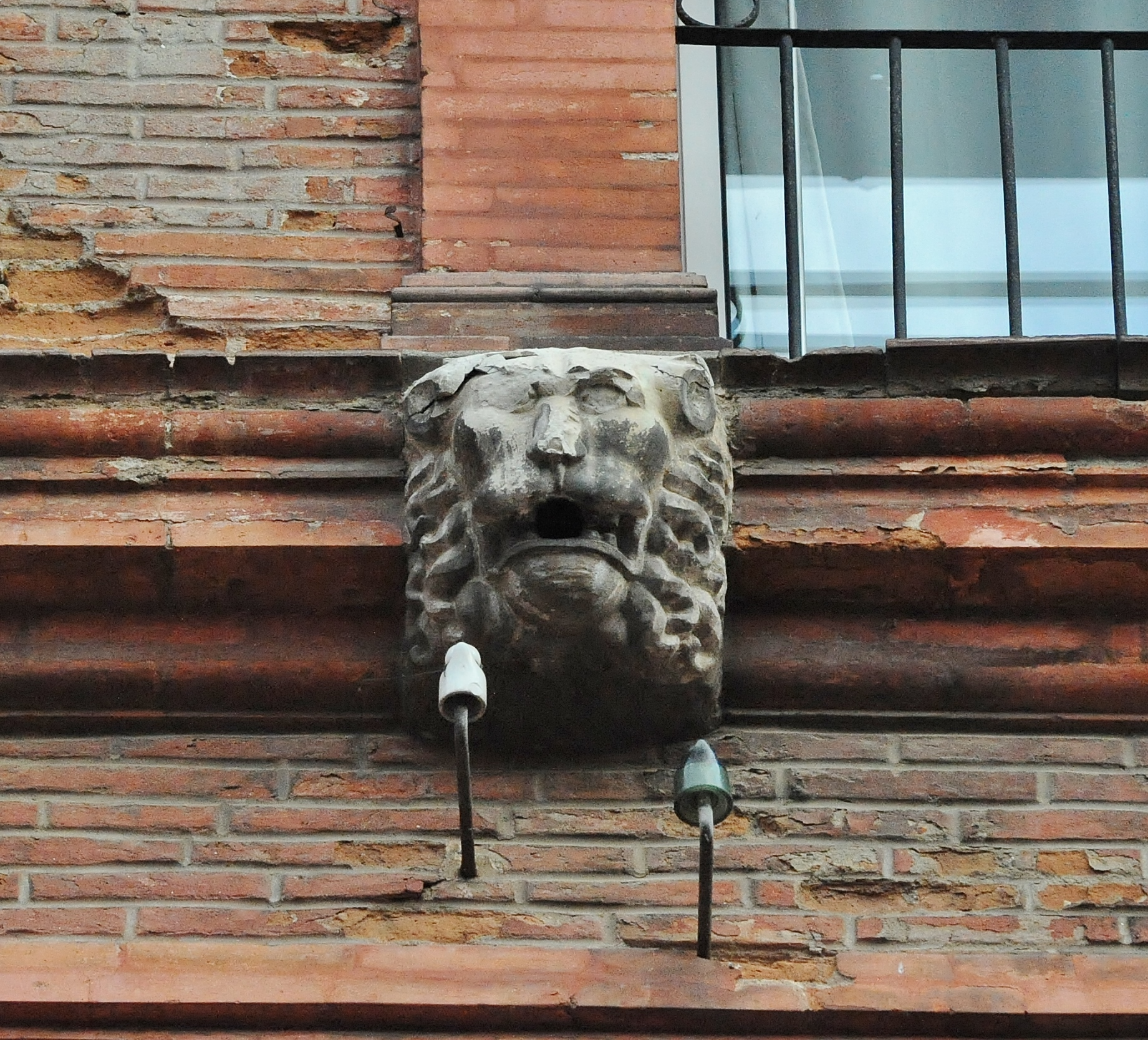
Tiffy: lion mufles / gargoyle.

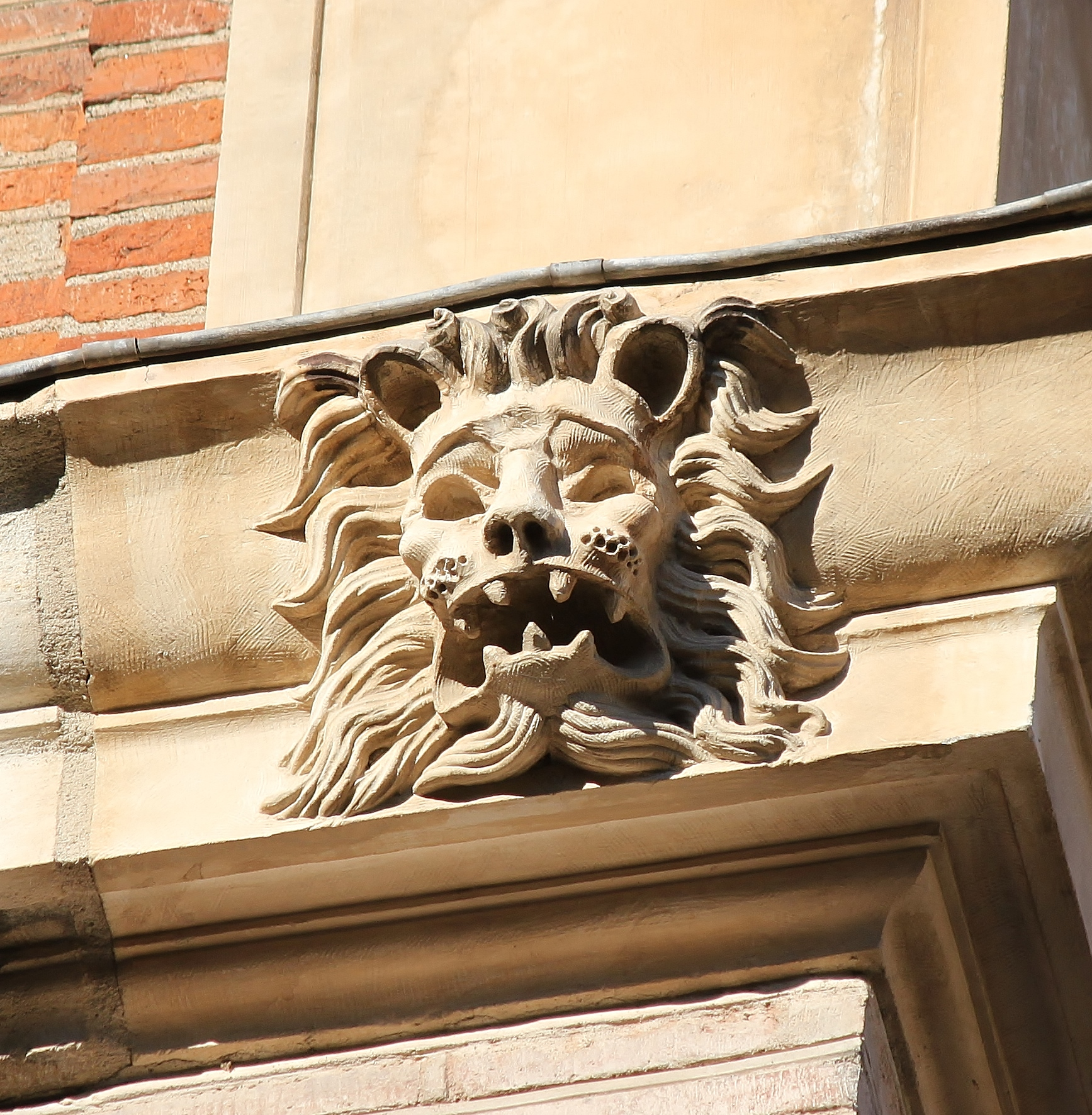
Assézat: lion mufles / gargoyle.

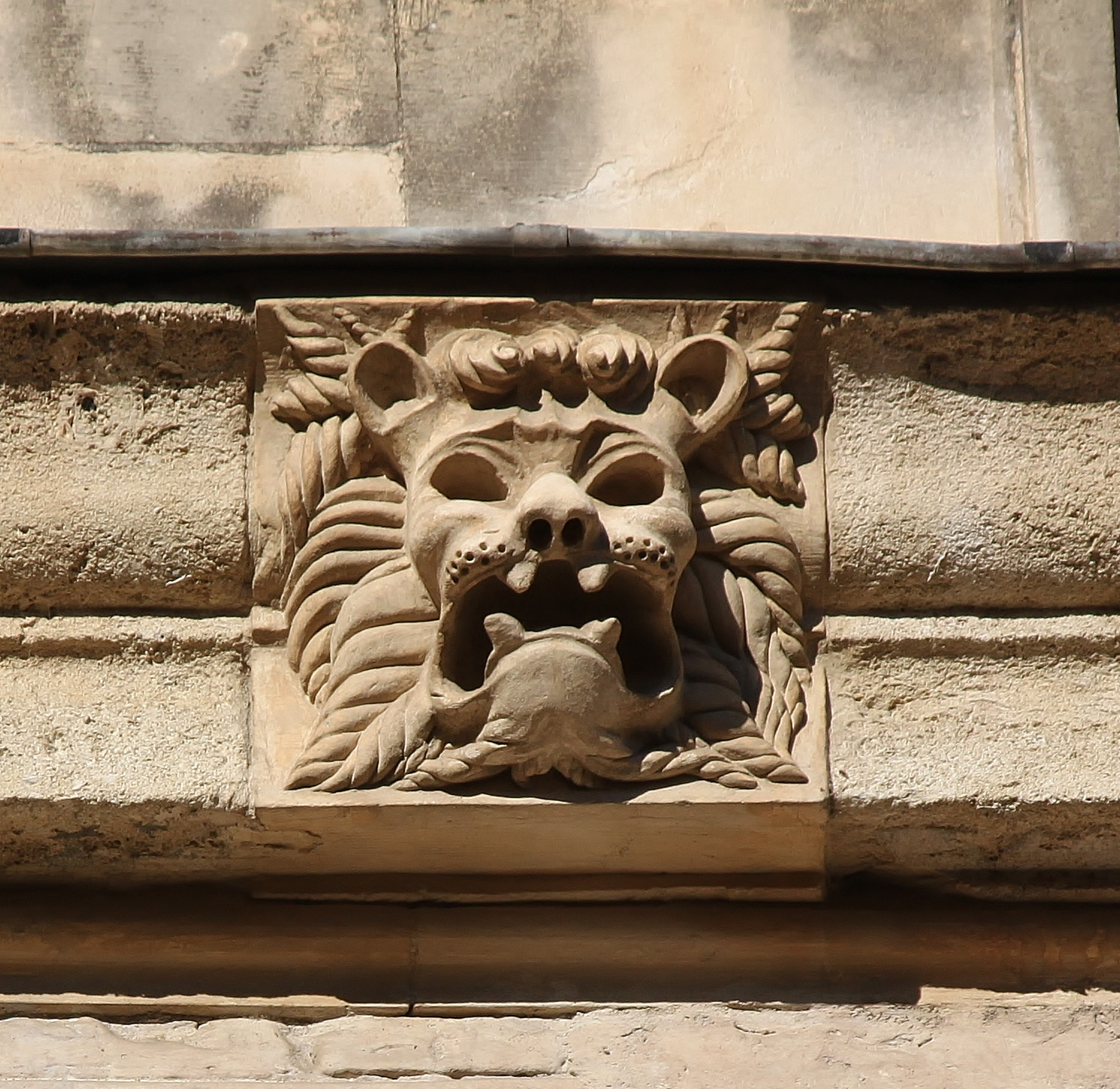
Assézat: lion mufles / gargoyle.

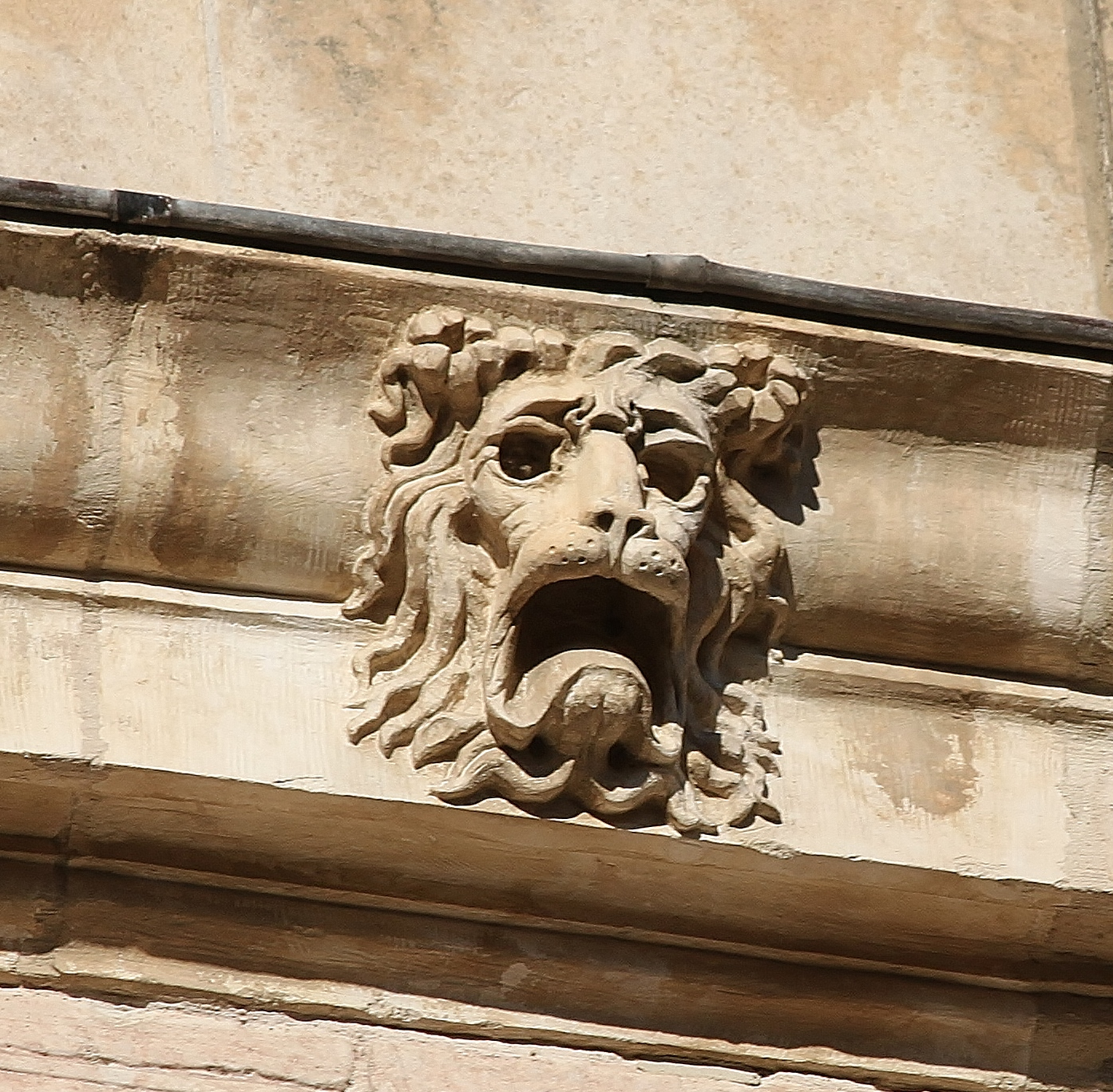
Assézat: lion mufles / gargoyle.

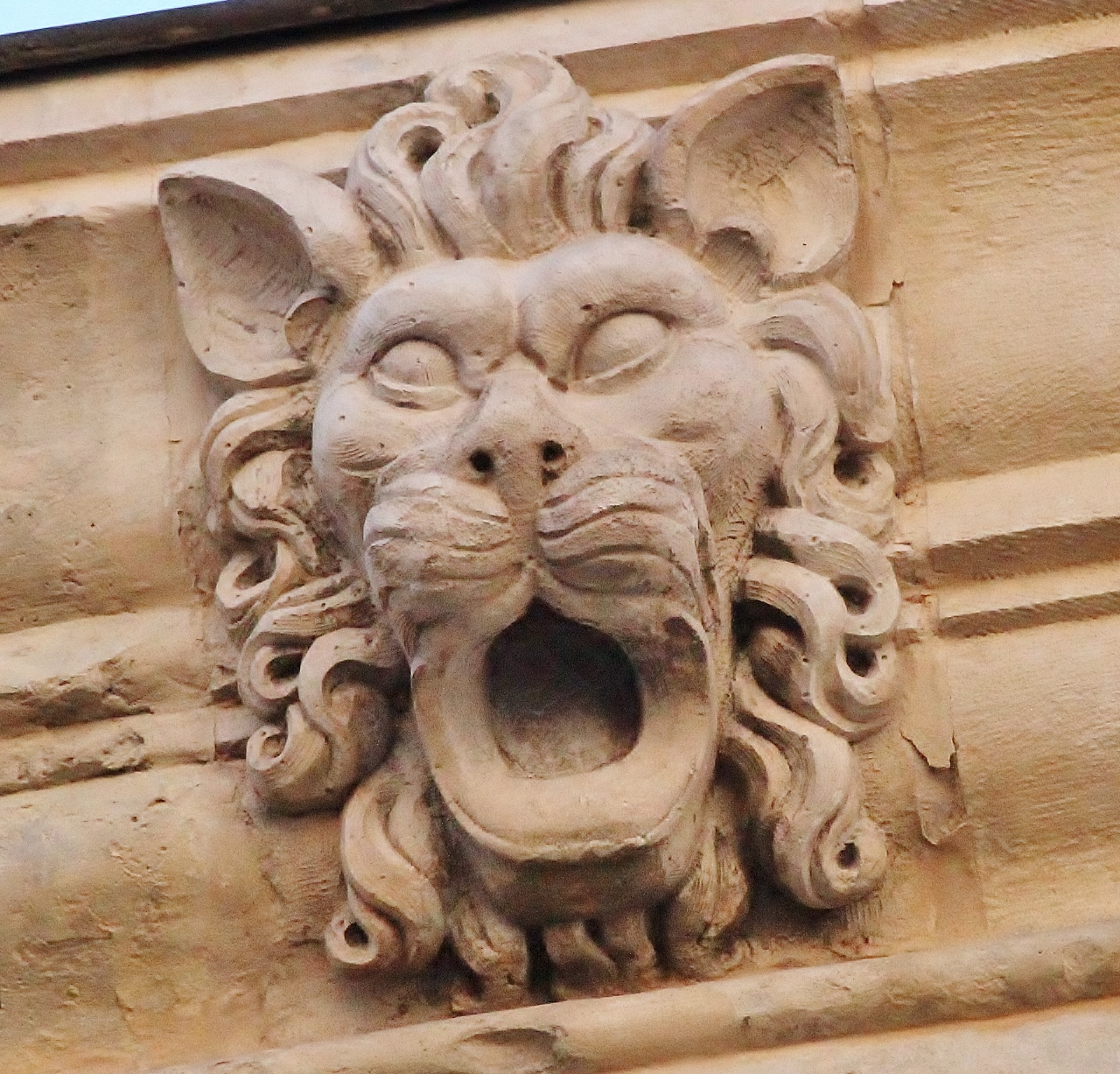
Clary: lion mufles / gargoyle.

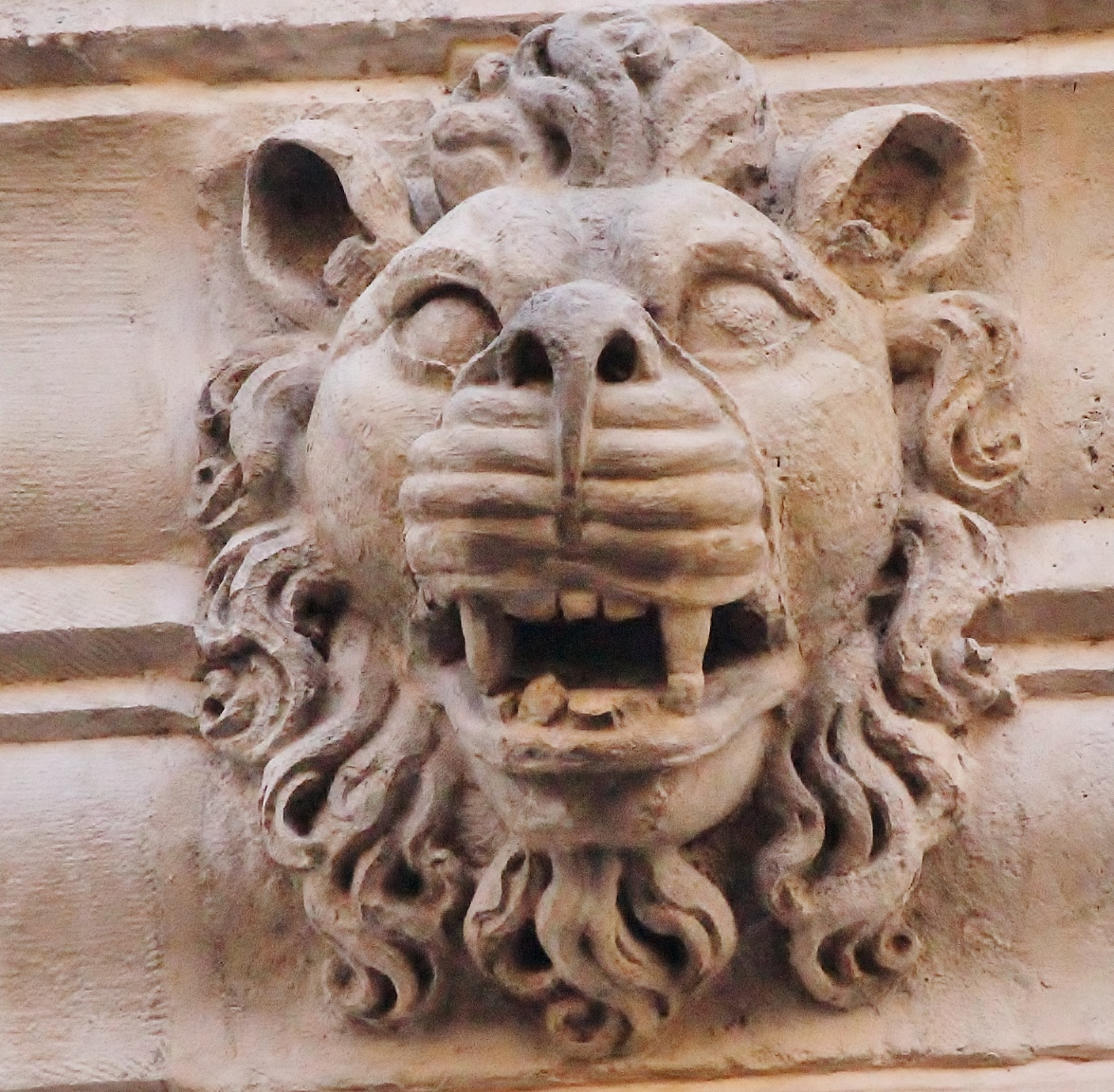
Clary: lion mufles / gargoyle.

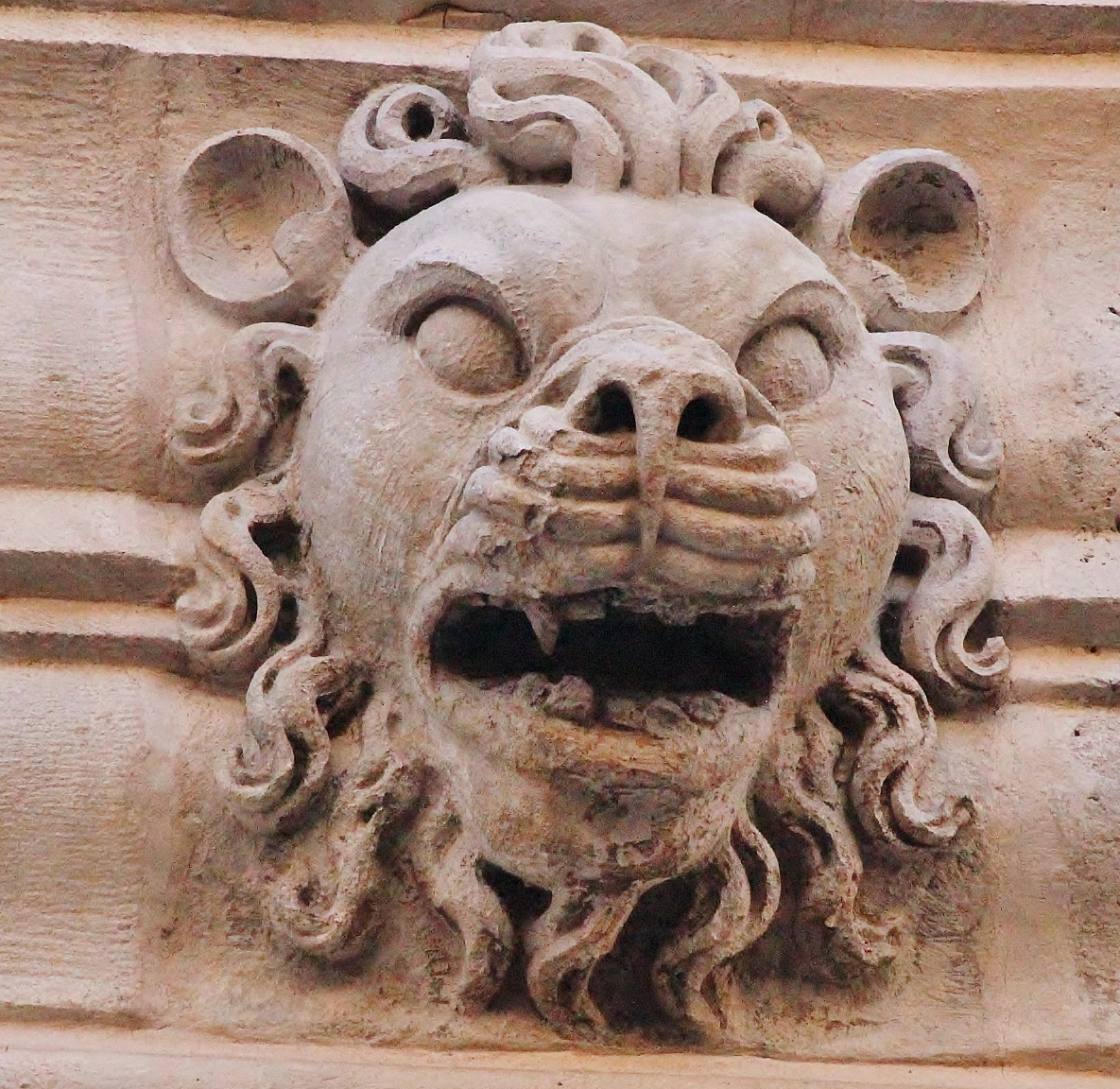
Clary: lion mufles / gargoyle.

=== Portraits in medallion ===
In a 16th-century marked by humanism and antiquarian culture, the owners did not hesitate to be represented as Roman emperors in medallions carved in stone, evocative of the ancient coins and medals collected by humanists. It was on the tower of the Hôtel du Vieux-Raisin that the owner Bérenguier Maynier, capitoul and parlementarian, had medallions made for the first time in Toulouse (between 1515 and 1528). The Toulouse prelate and humanist Jean de Pins, ambassador to Milan, Venice and Rome, played a major role in the introduction of Italian models by having the courtyard of his hotel decorated around 1528 with heads sculpted in medallions. The next owner of this same Hôtel de Pins had other medallions made in 1545, attributed to Nicolas Bachelier, six of which were reused in the courtyard of the Hôtel Thomas de Montval. Their framing composed of a vegetal crown, referred to as "triumphal garland" in surviving documents, refers to the Roman triumphs (laurel) but also to the arms of the merchant of the 16th century. The manner of Nicolas Bachelier is distinguished in the treatment of the very prominent eyebrow arches and the very often thick lips of his characters.

After 1540 an evolution led to unframed busts, as on the tower of the Hôtel de Brucelles built in 1544. This type of decoration then became rarer, replaced in the middle of the 16th century by the Classical orders.

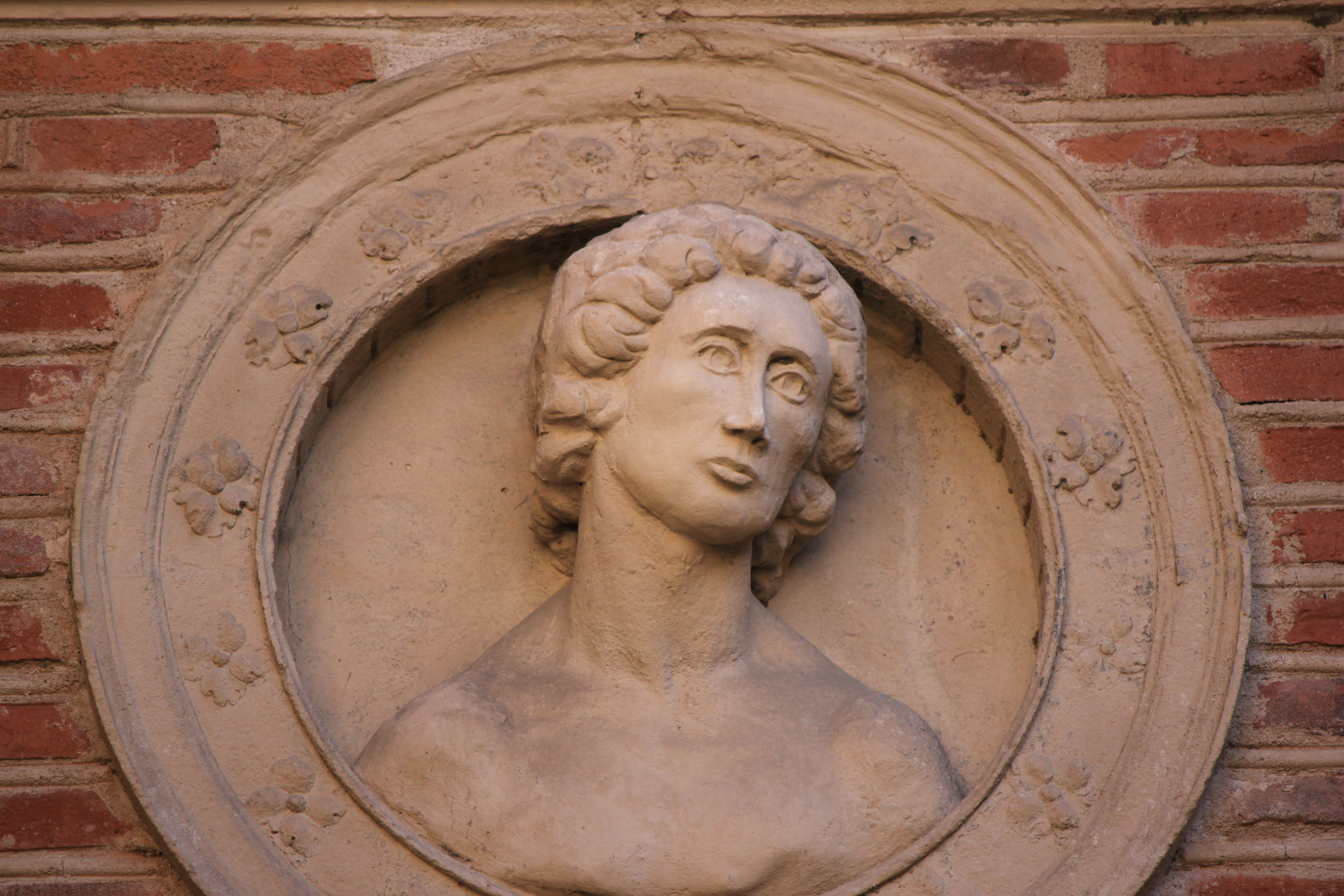
Hôtel du Vieux Raisin.

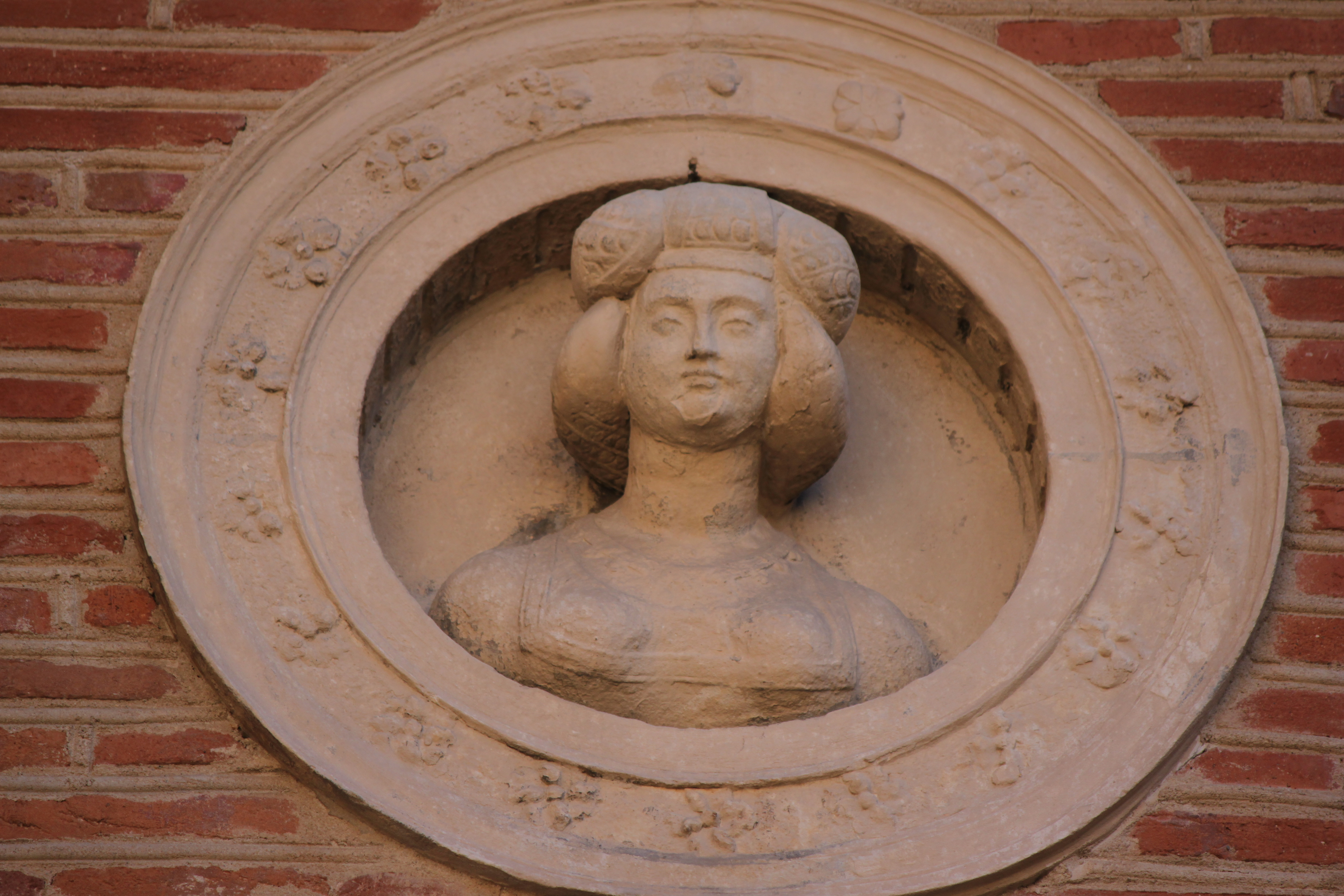
Hôtel du Vieux Raisin.

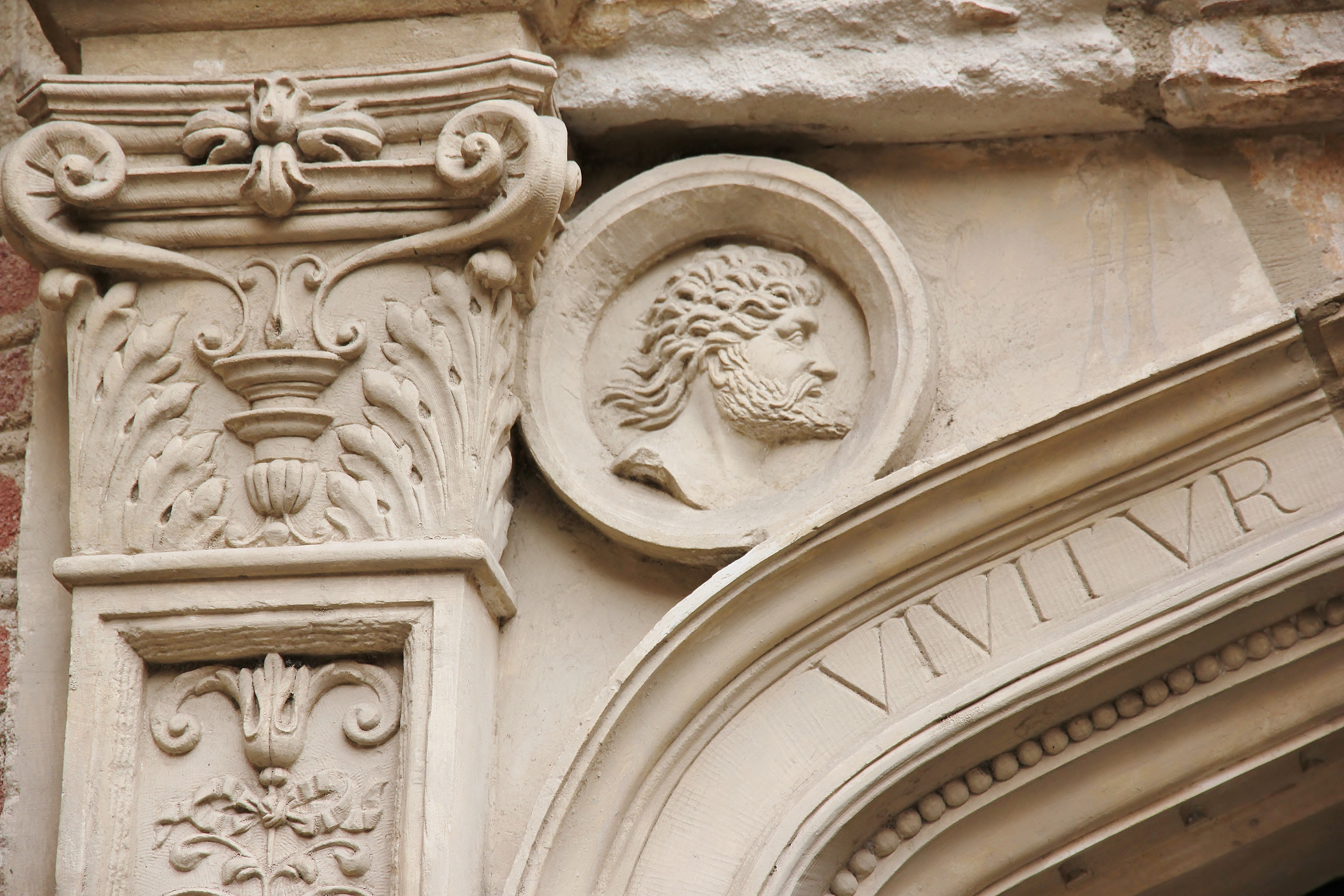
Hôtel du Vieux Raisin.

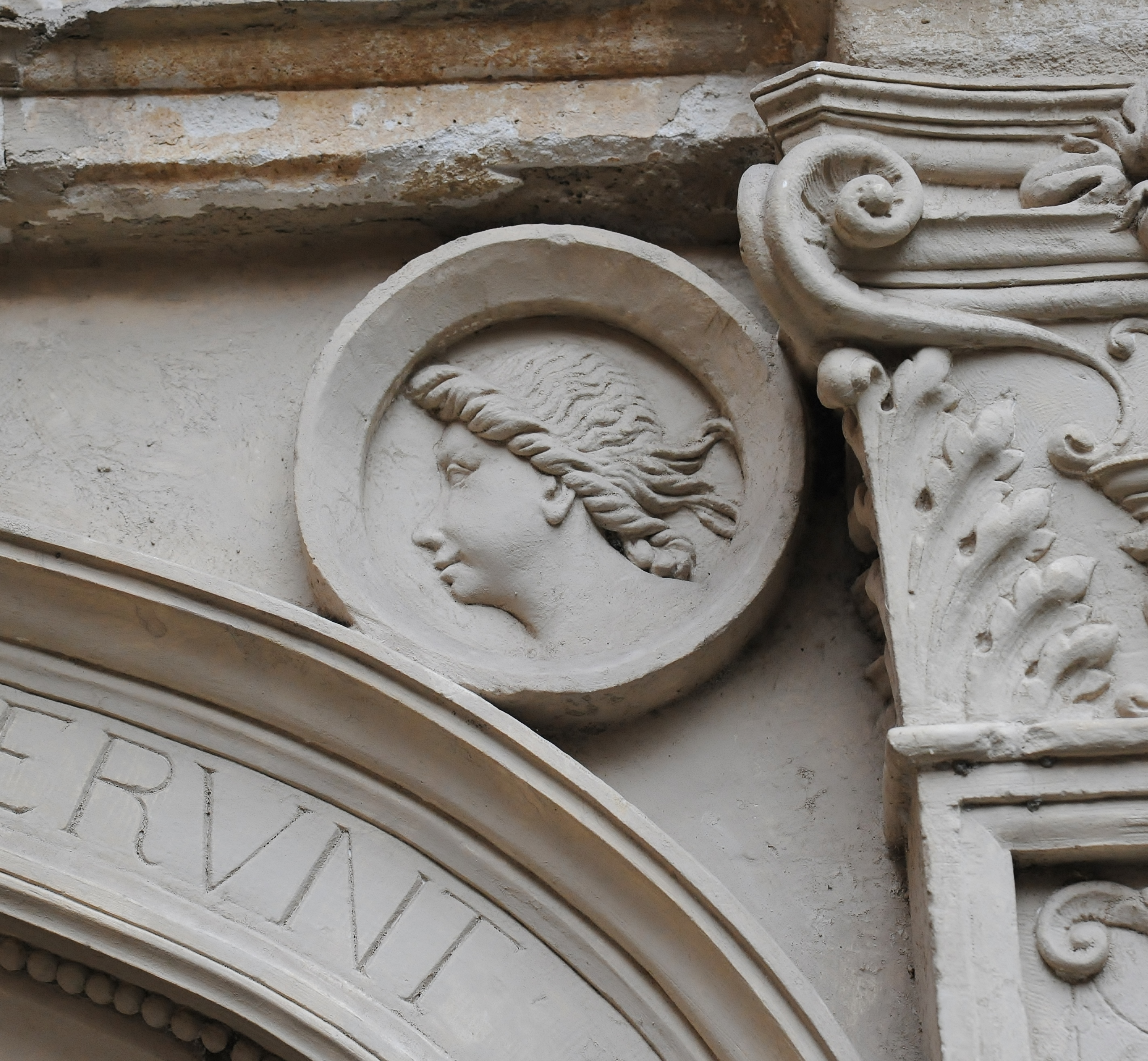
Hôtel du Vieux Raisin.

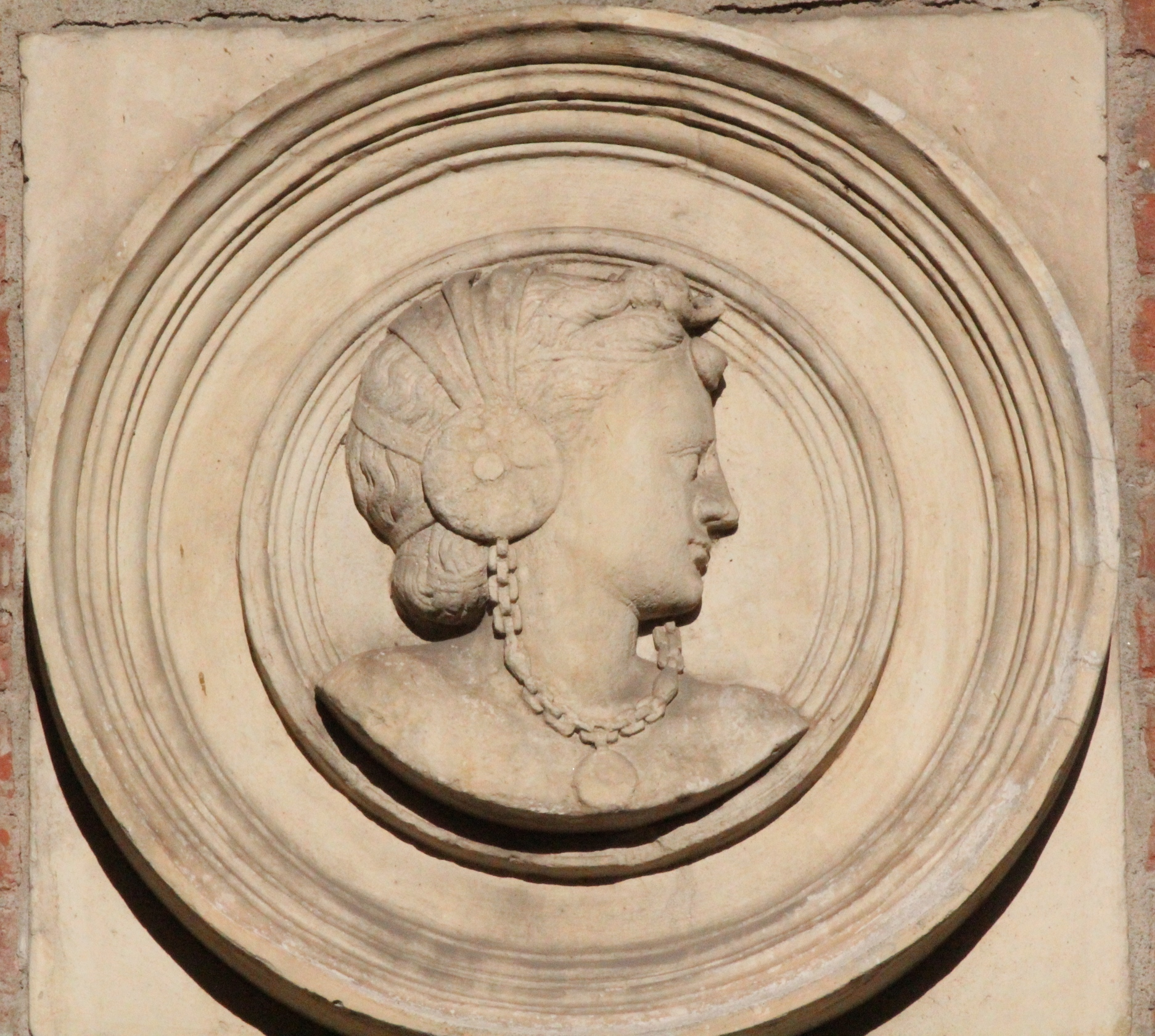
Hôtel de Pins.

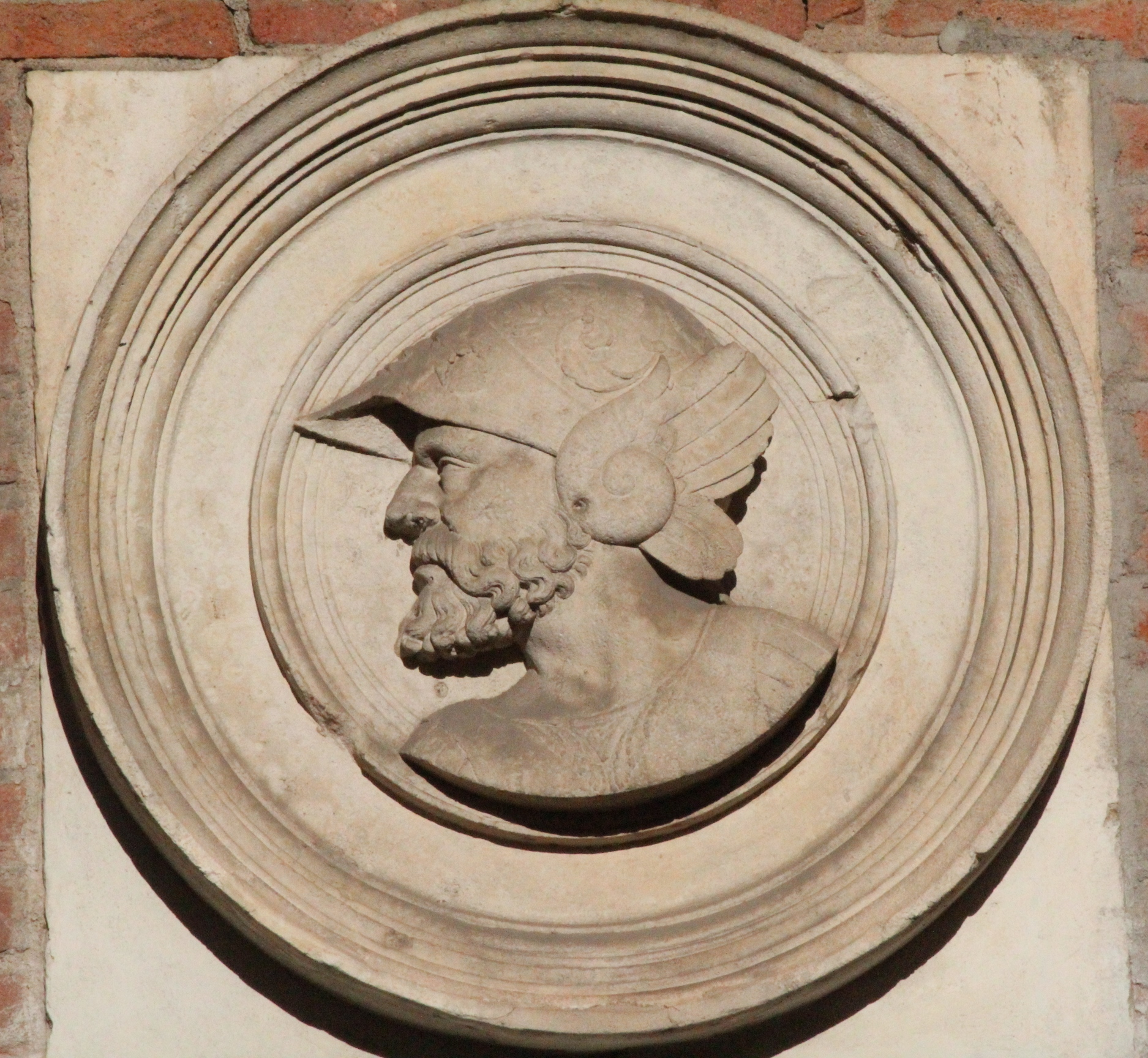
Hôtel de Pins.

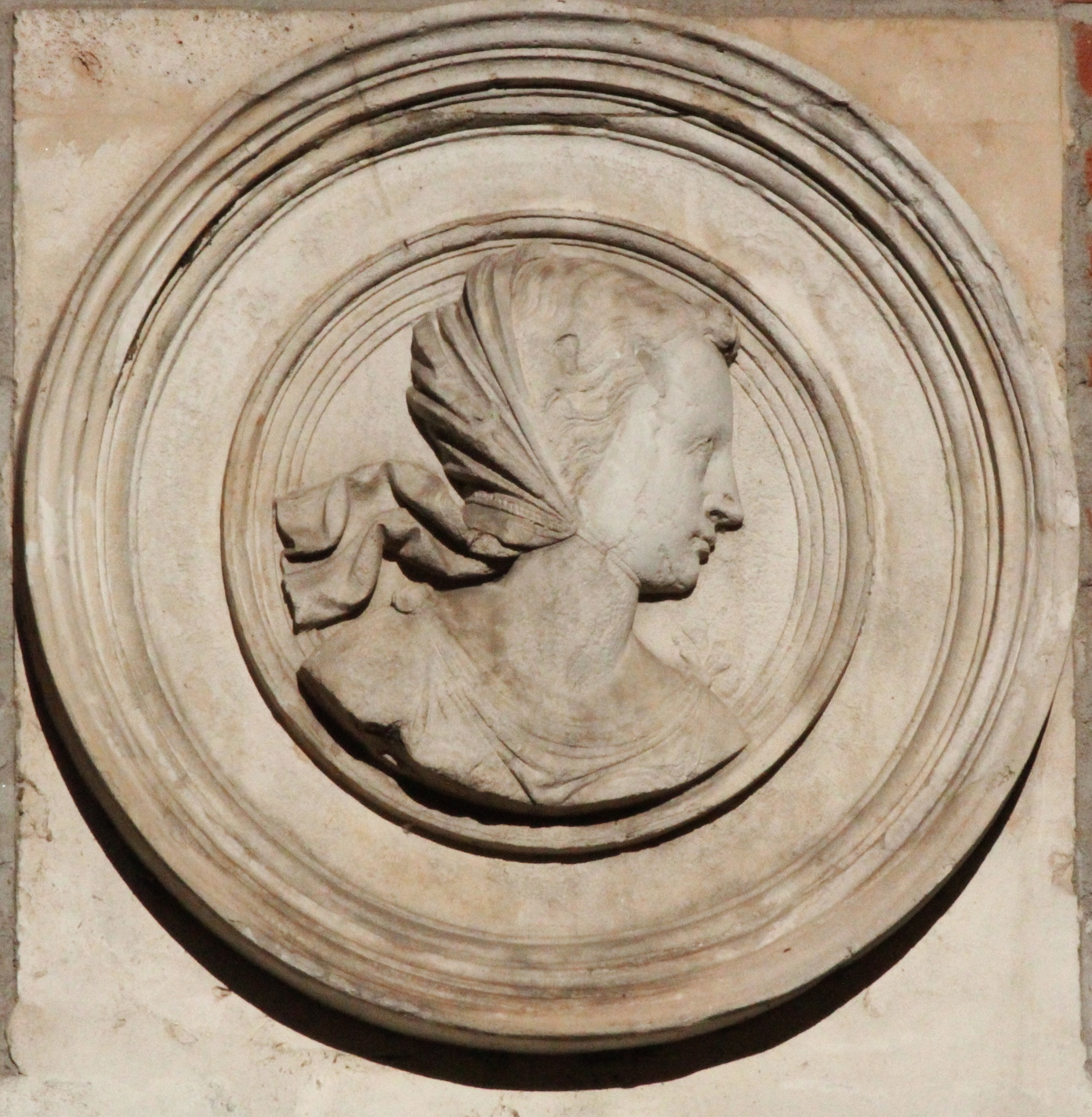
Hôtel de Pins.

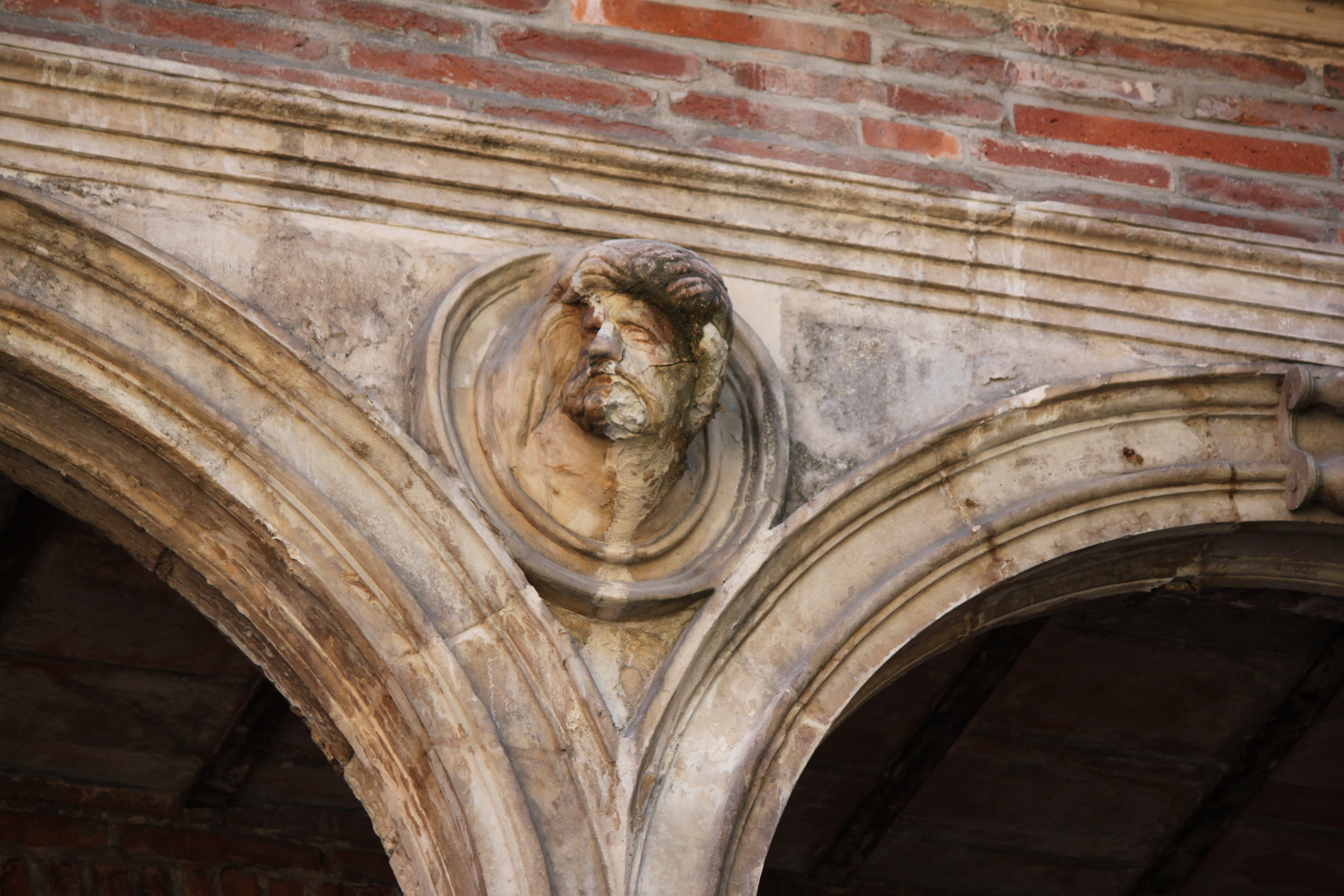
Hôtel de Pins.

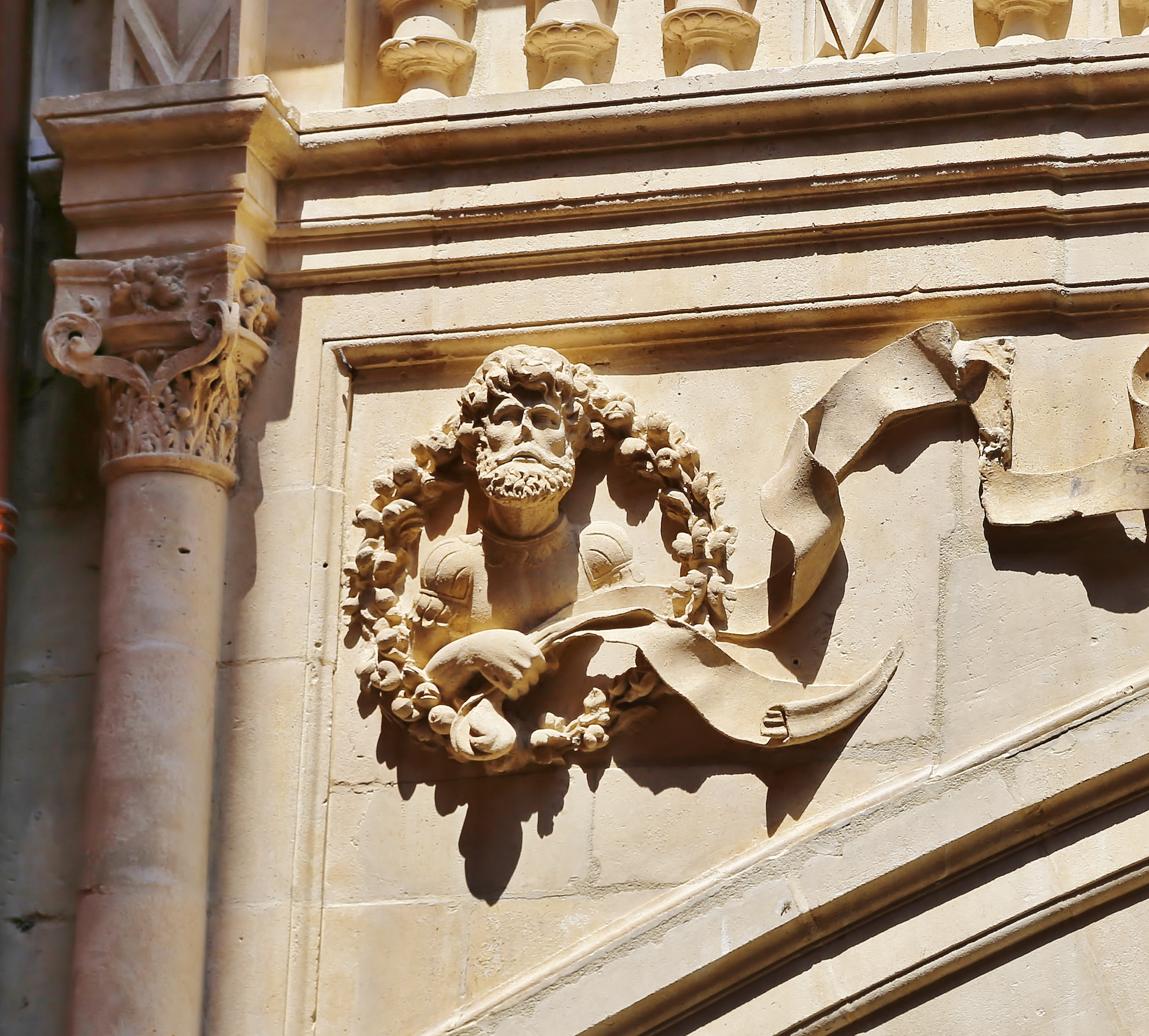
Hôtel de Bernuy (Louis Privat).

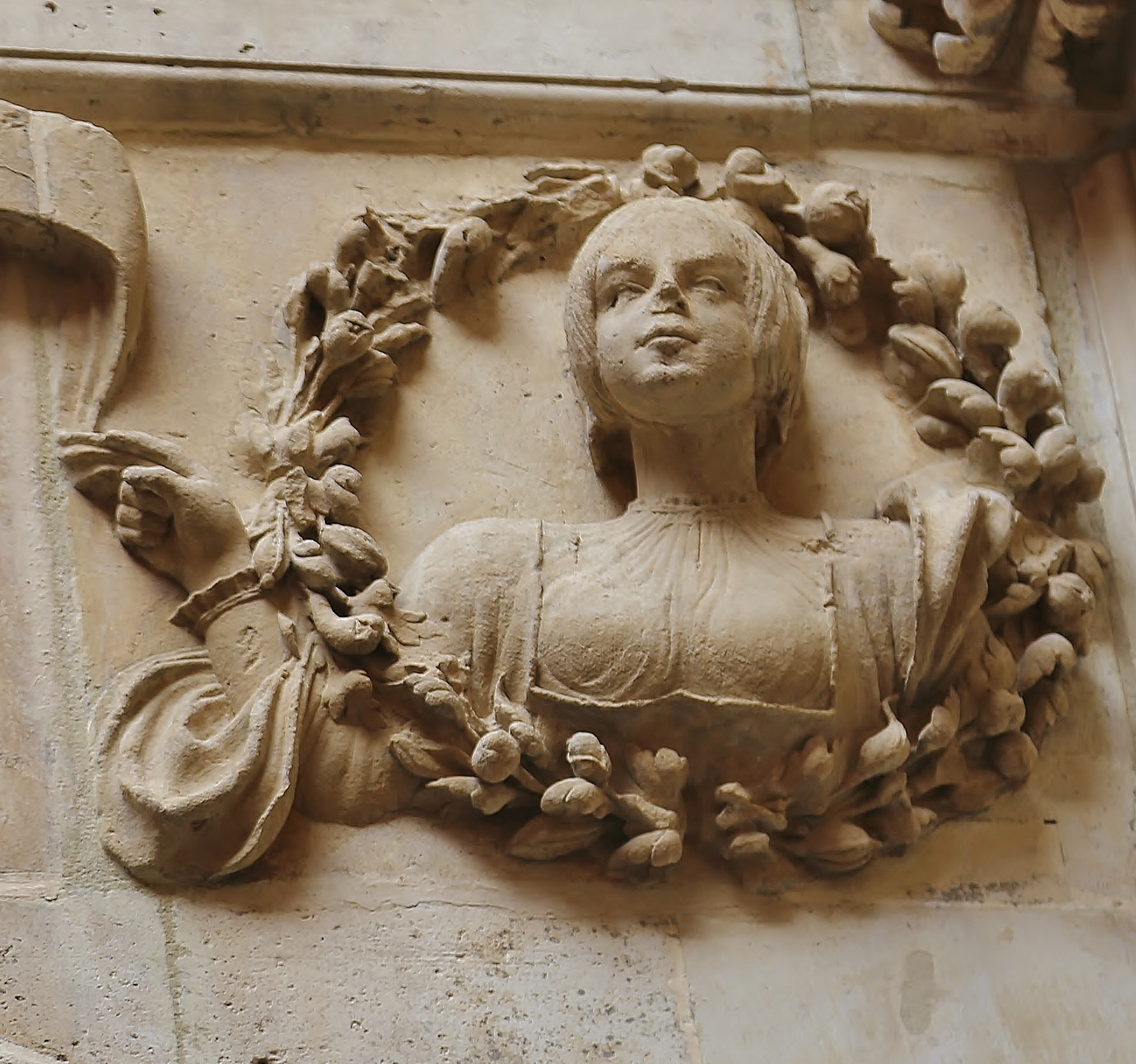
Hôtel de Bernuy (Louis Privat).

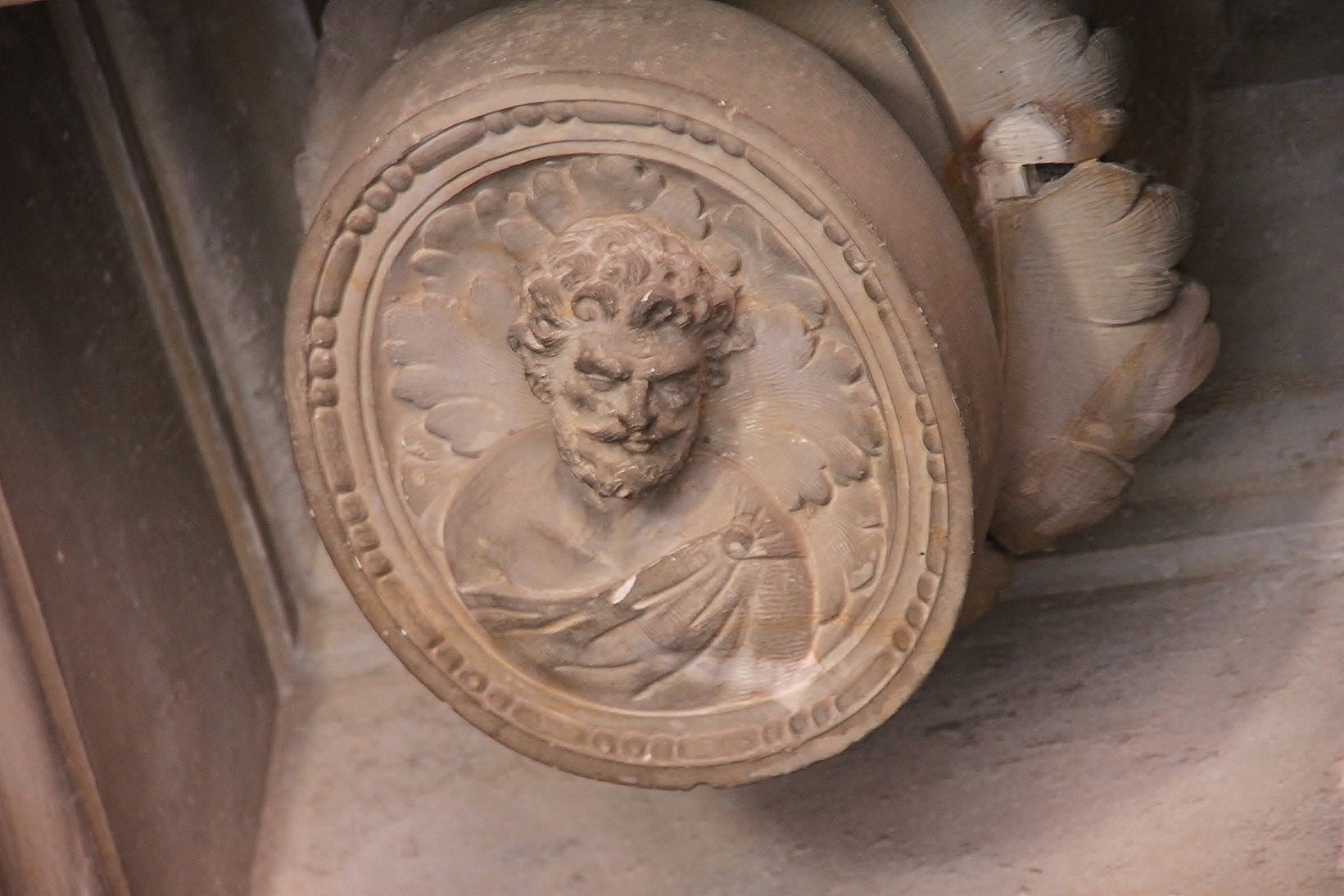
Hôtel de Bernuy (Louis Privat).

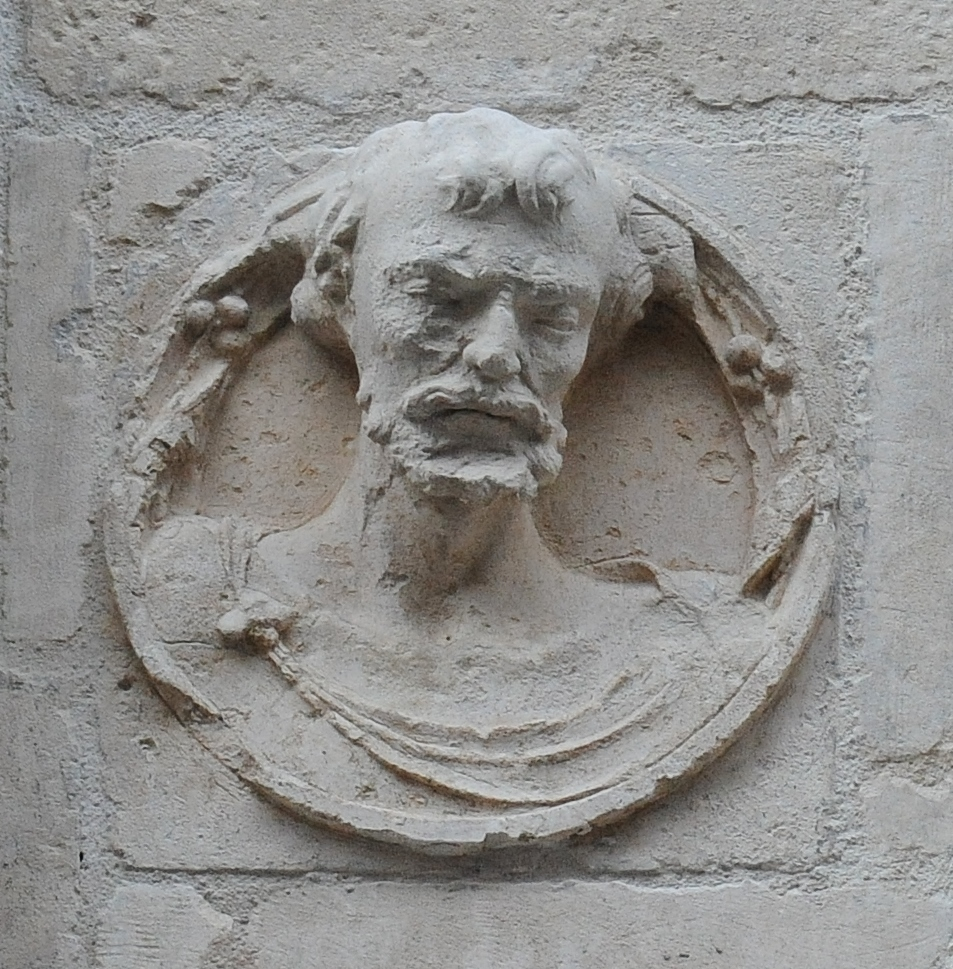
Hôtel de Bernuy (gate, Louis Privat).

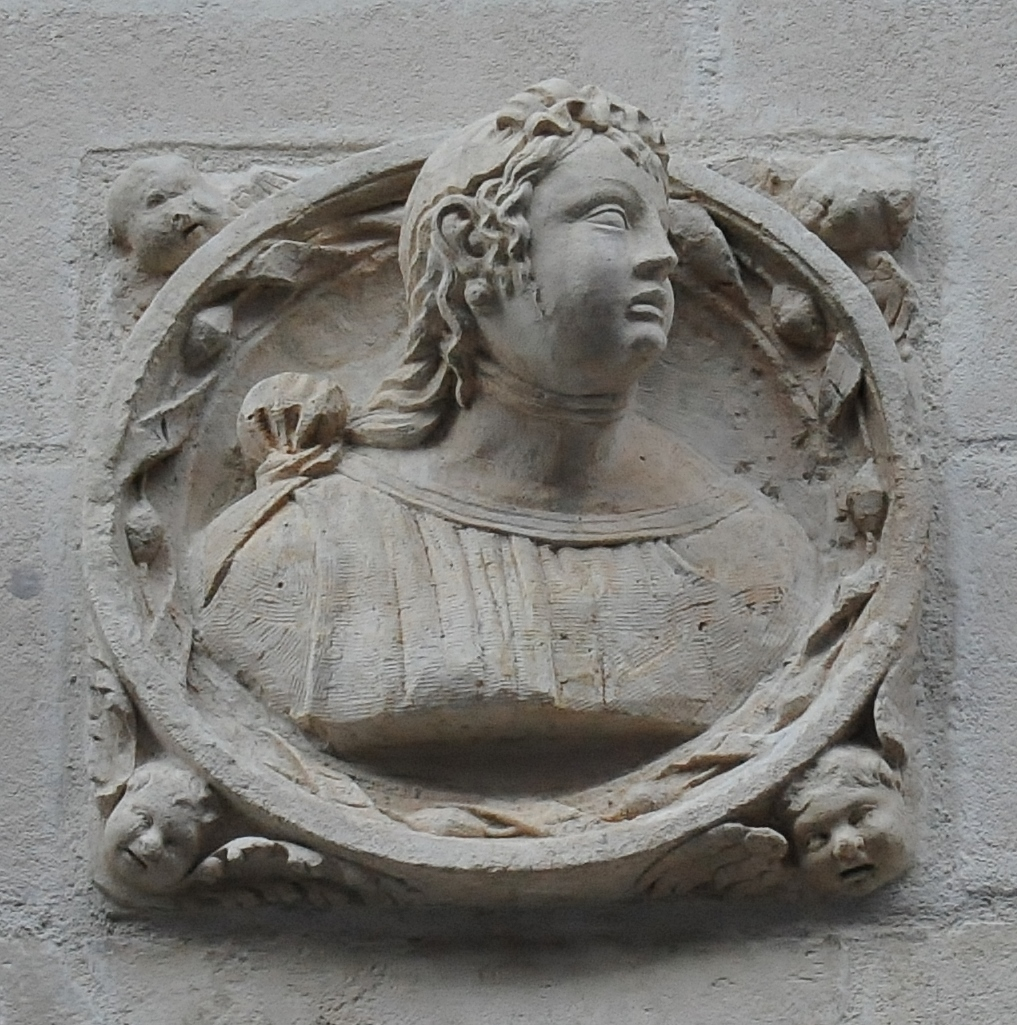
Hôtel de Bernuy (gate, Louis Privat).

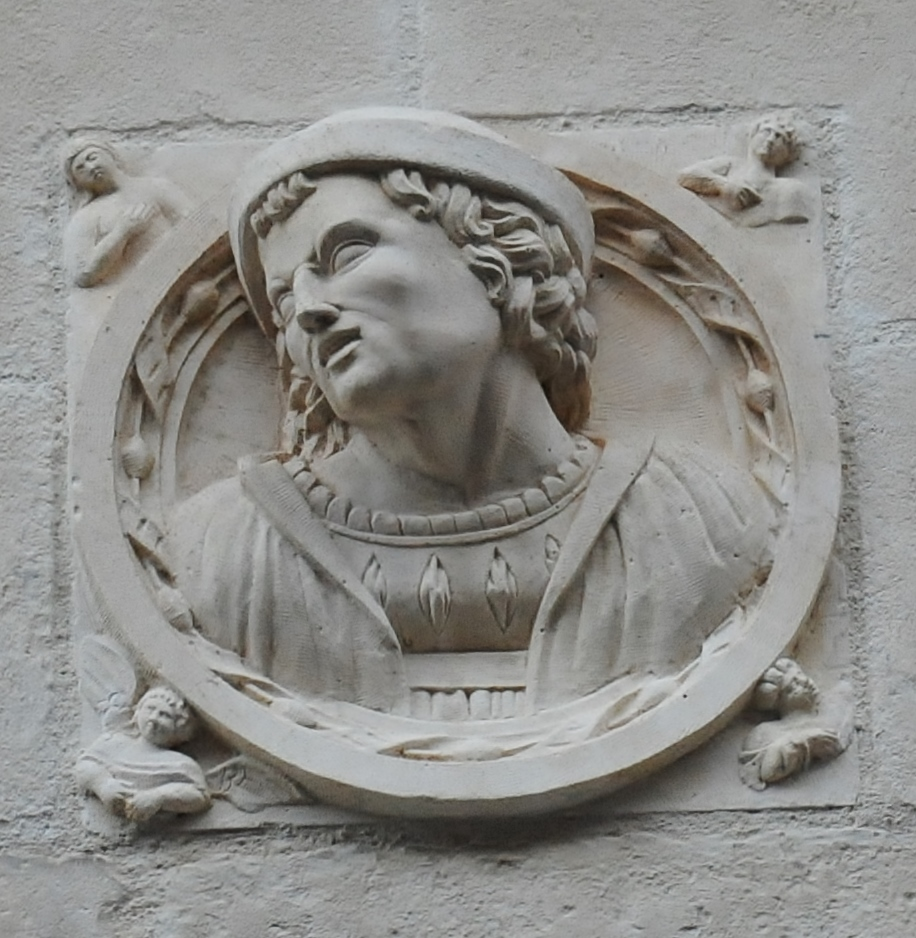
Hôtel de Bernuy (gate, Louis Privat).

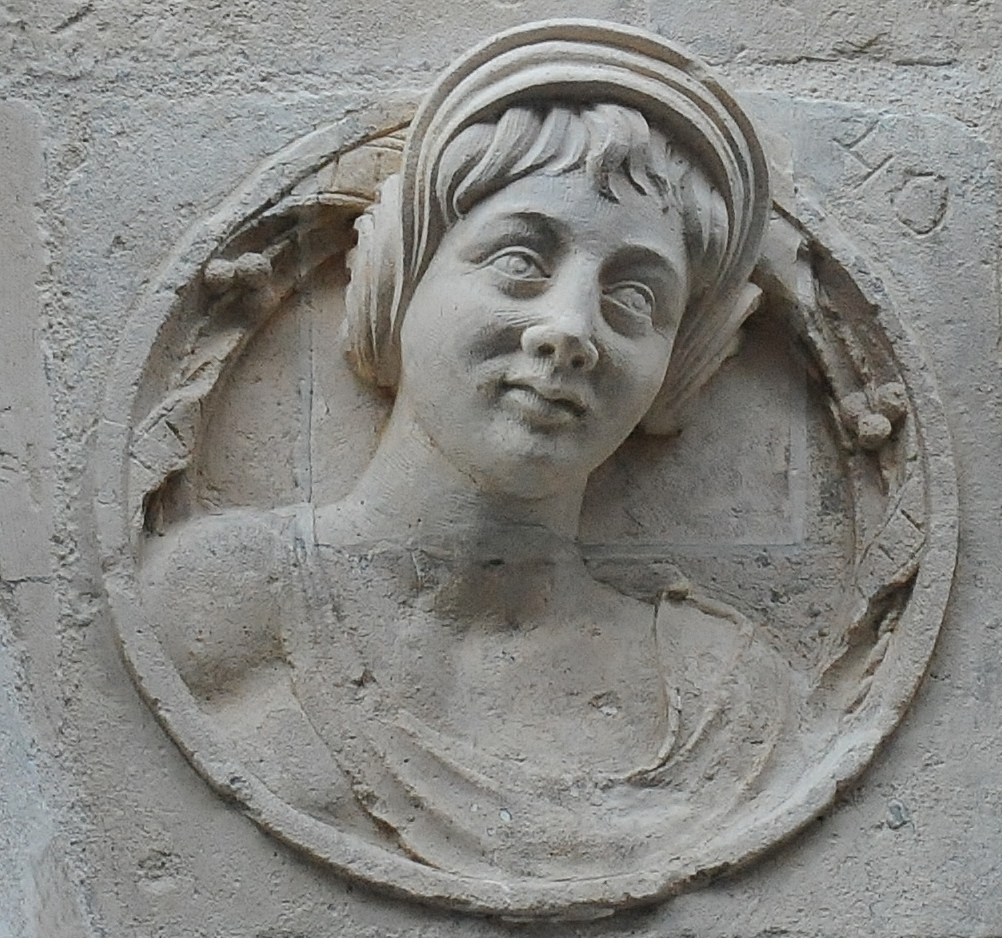
Hôtel de Bernuy (gate, Louis Privat).

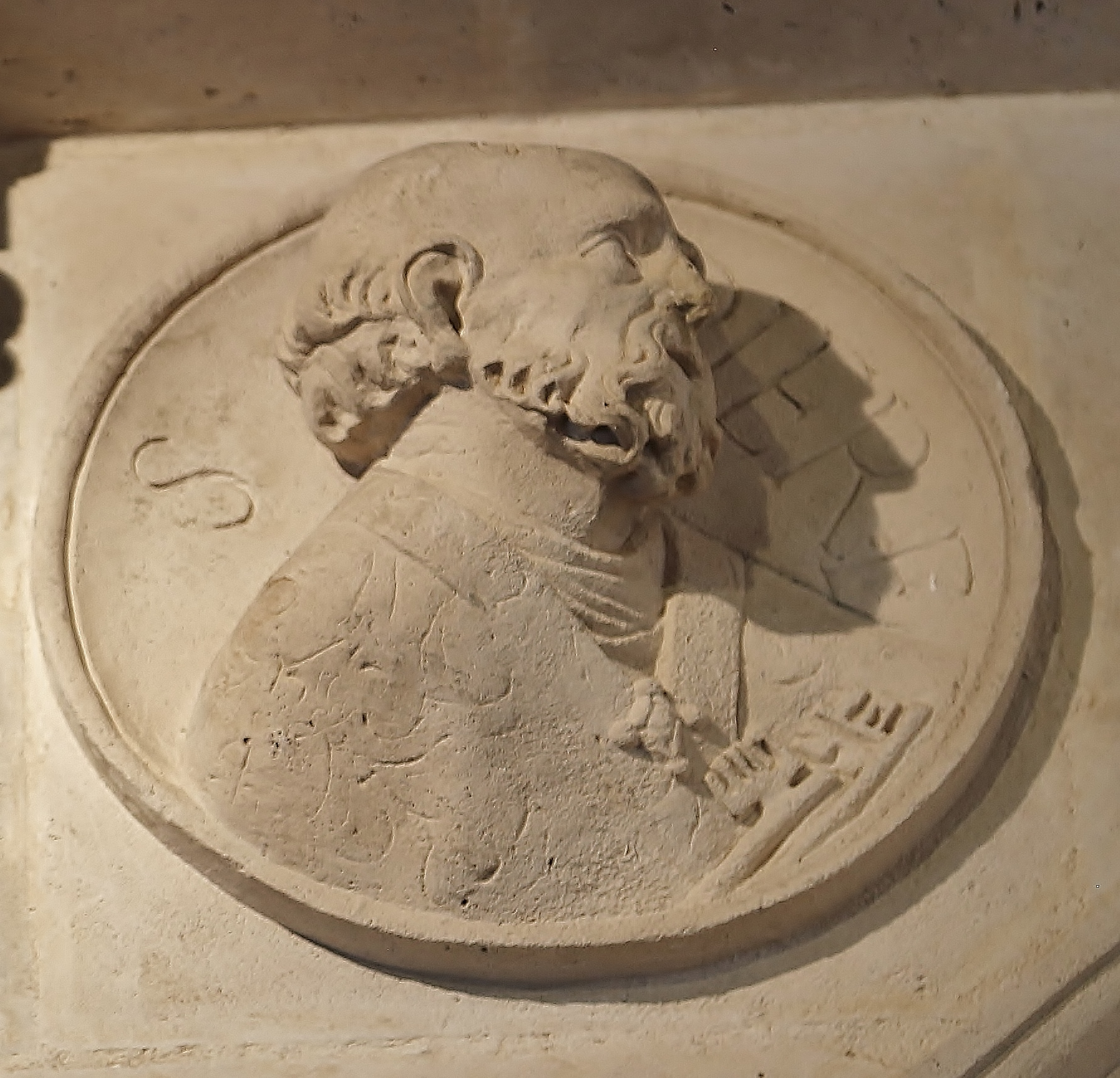
Fireplace of the Tornié-Barrassy Hôtel.

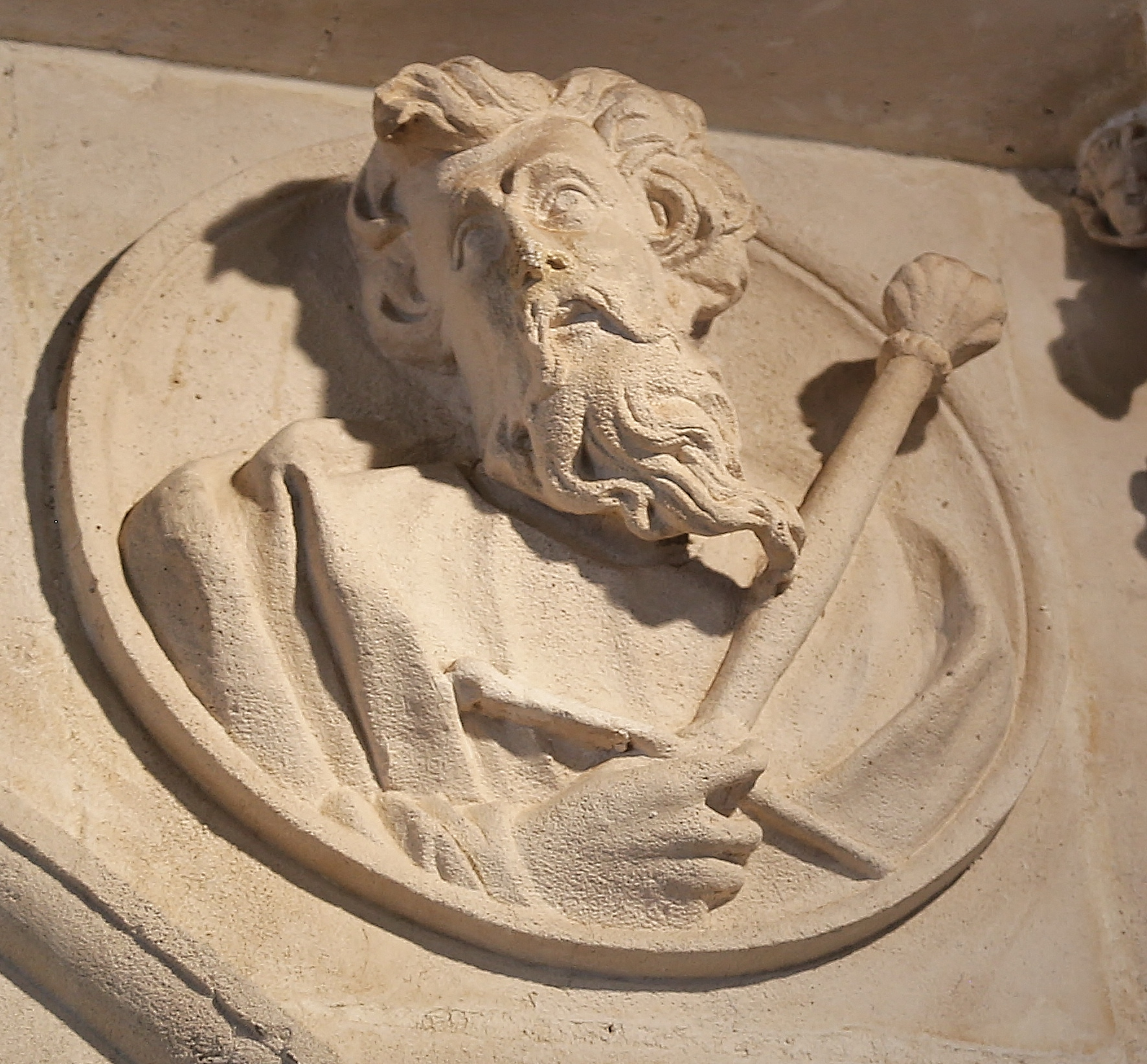
Fireplace of the Tornié-Barrassy Hôtel.

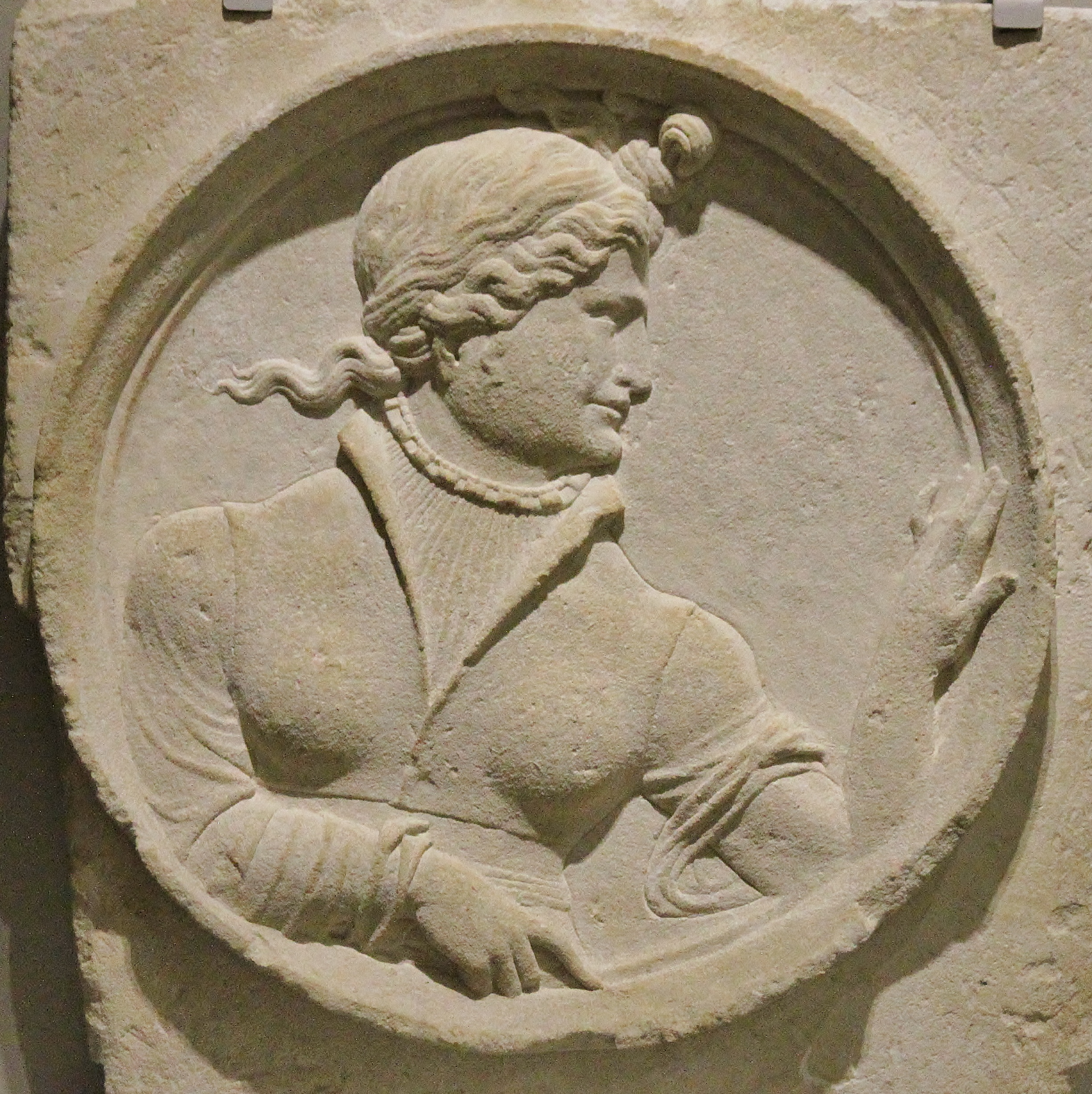
Chapel of the Consistories (destroyed, Louis Privat).

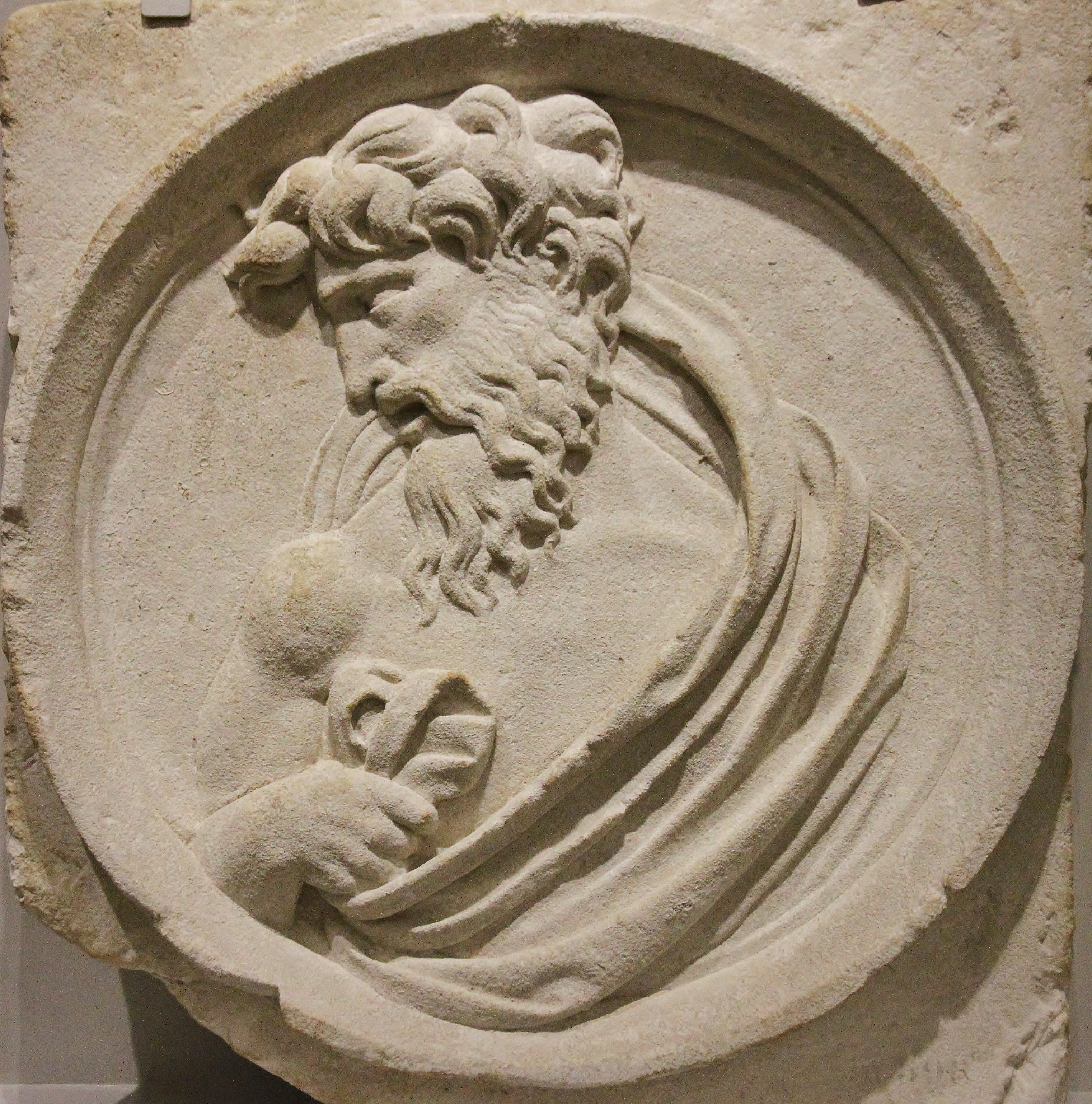
Chapel of the Consistories (destroyed, Louis Privat).

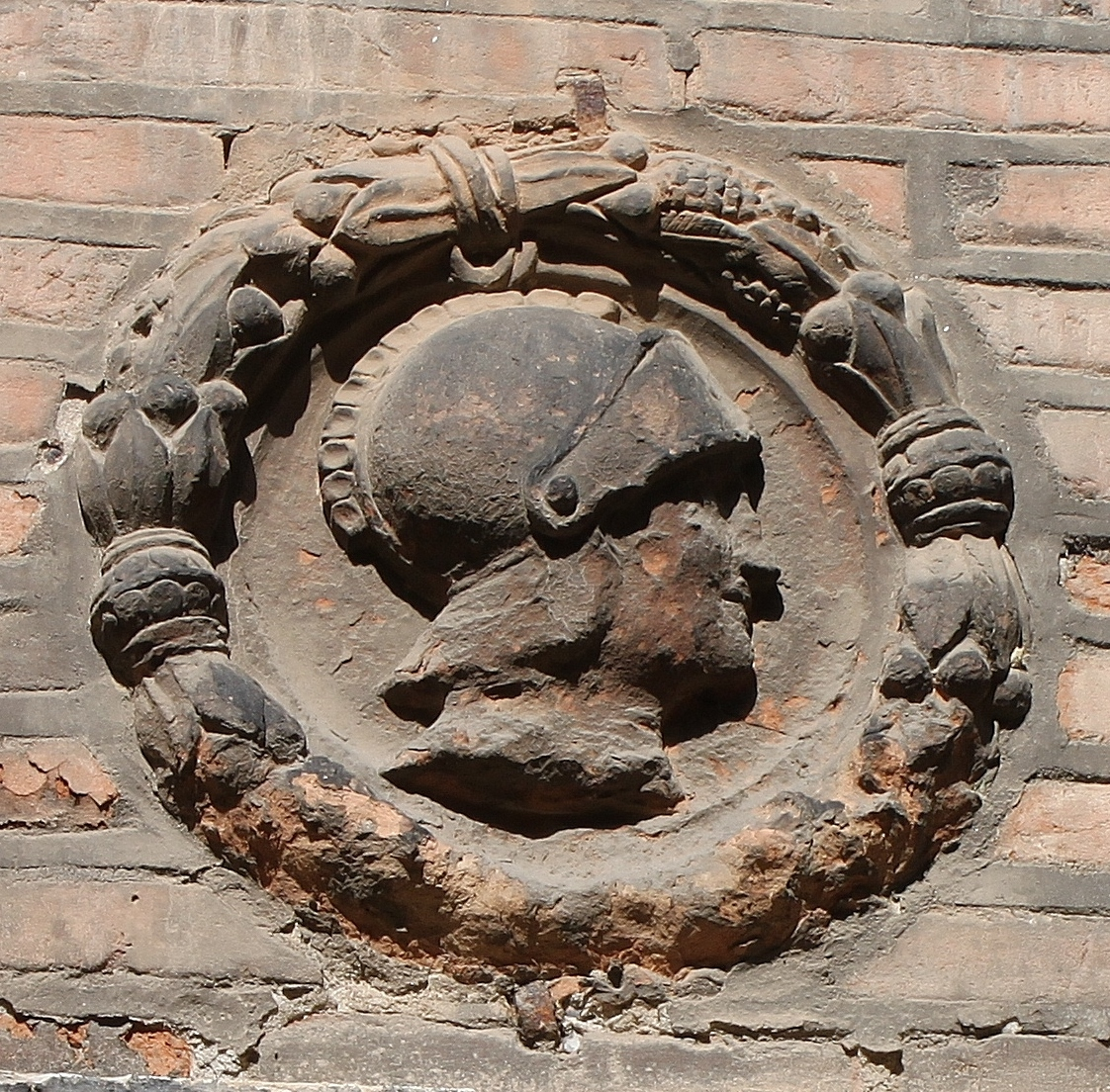
Hôtel d'Ulmo.

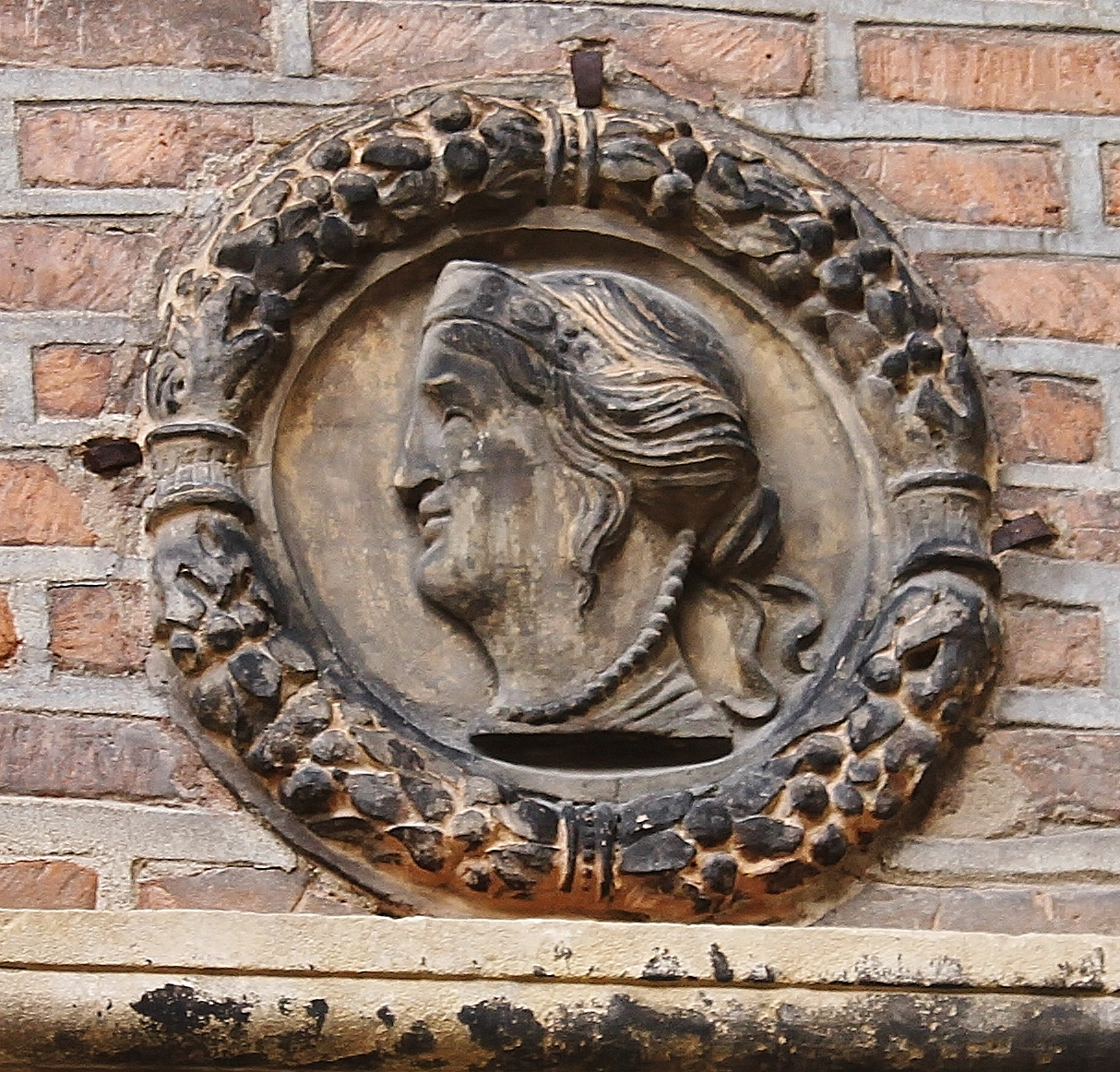
Hôtel d'Ulmo.

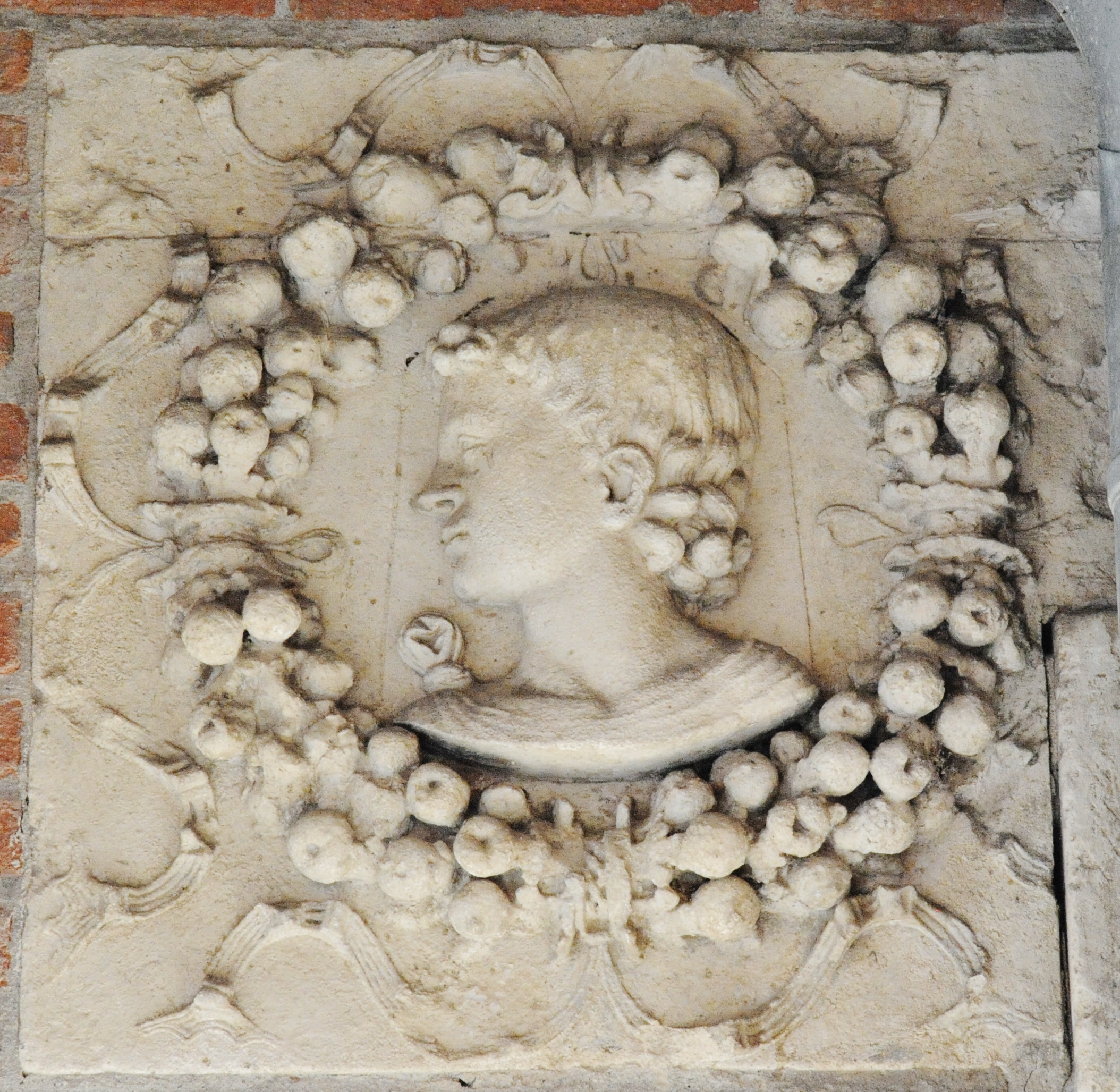
Hôtel de Pins (Nicolas Bachelier?).

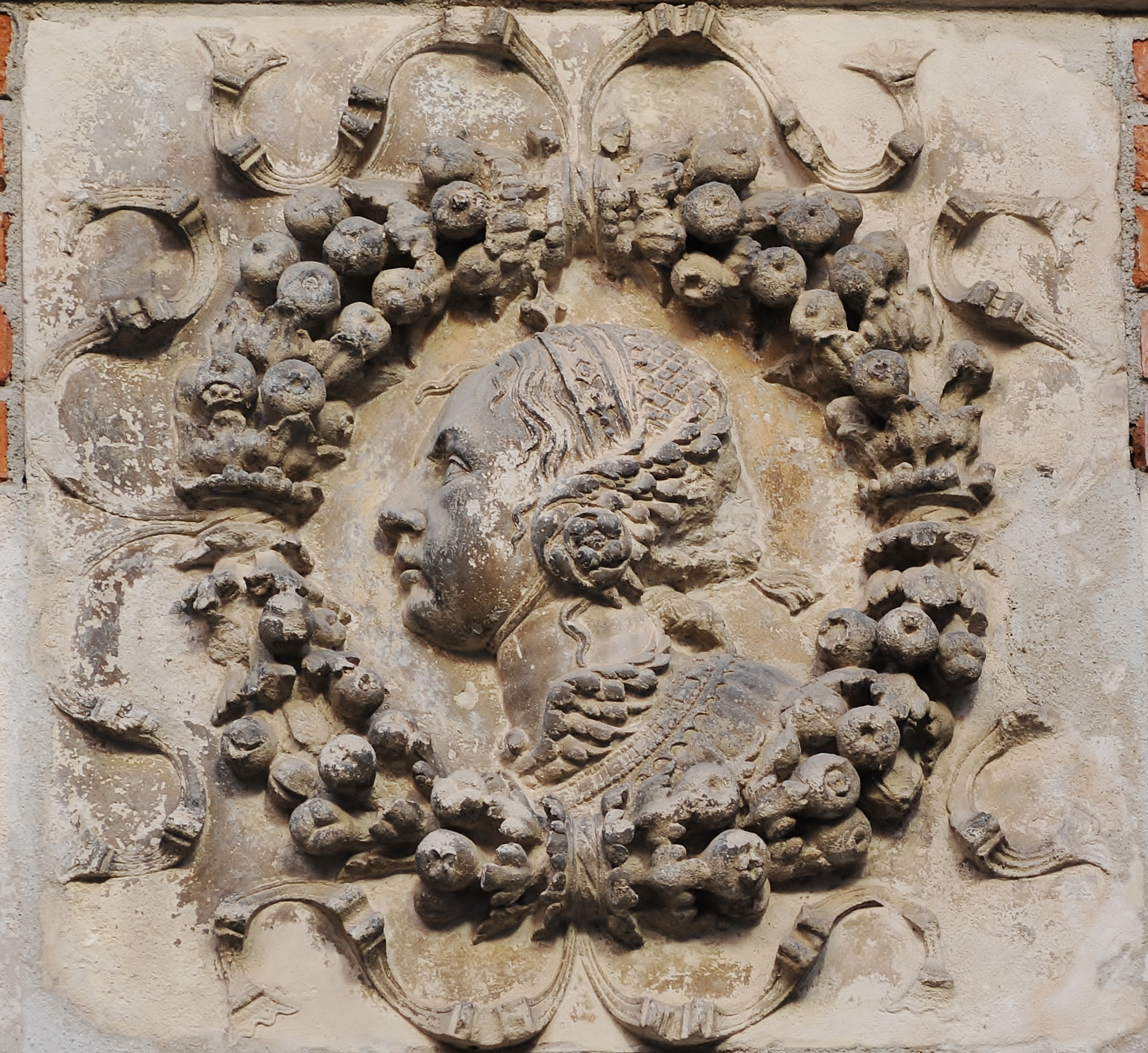
Hôtel Thomas de Montval (provenance: hôtel de Pins - Nicolas Bachelier).

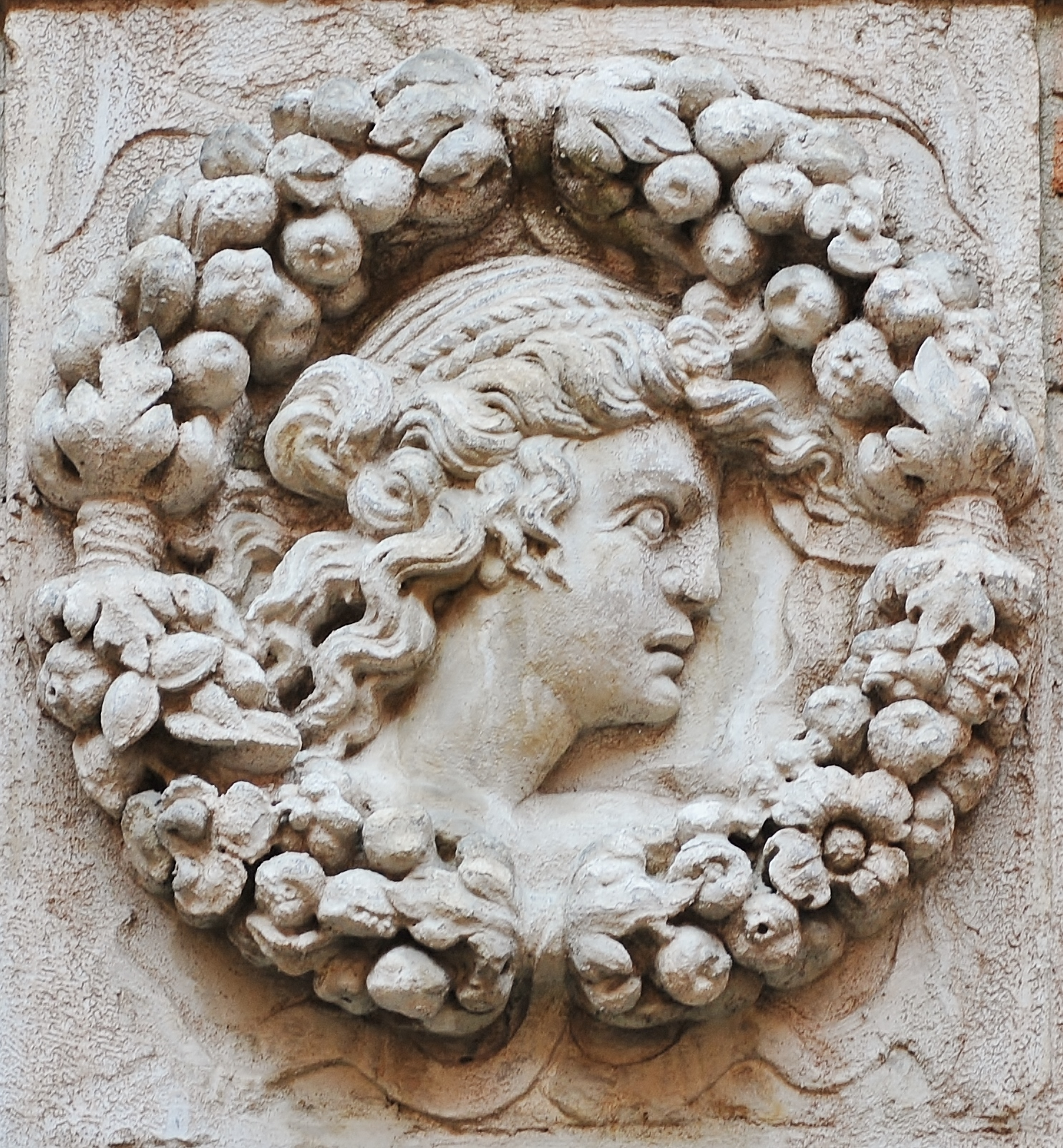
Hôtel Thomas de Montval (provenance: hôtel de Pins - Nicolas Bachelier).

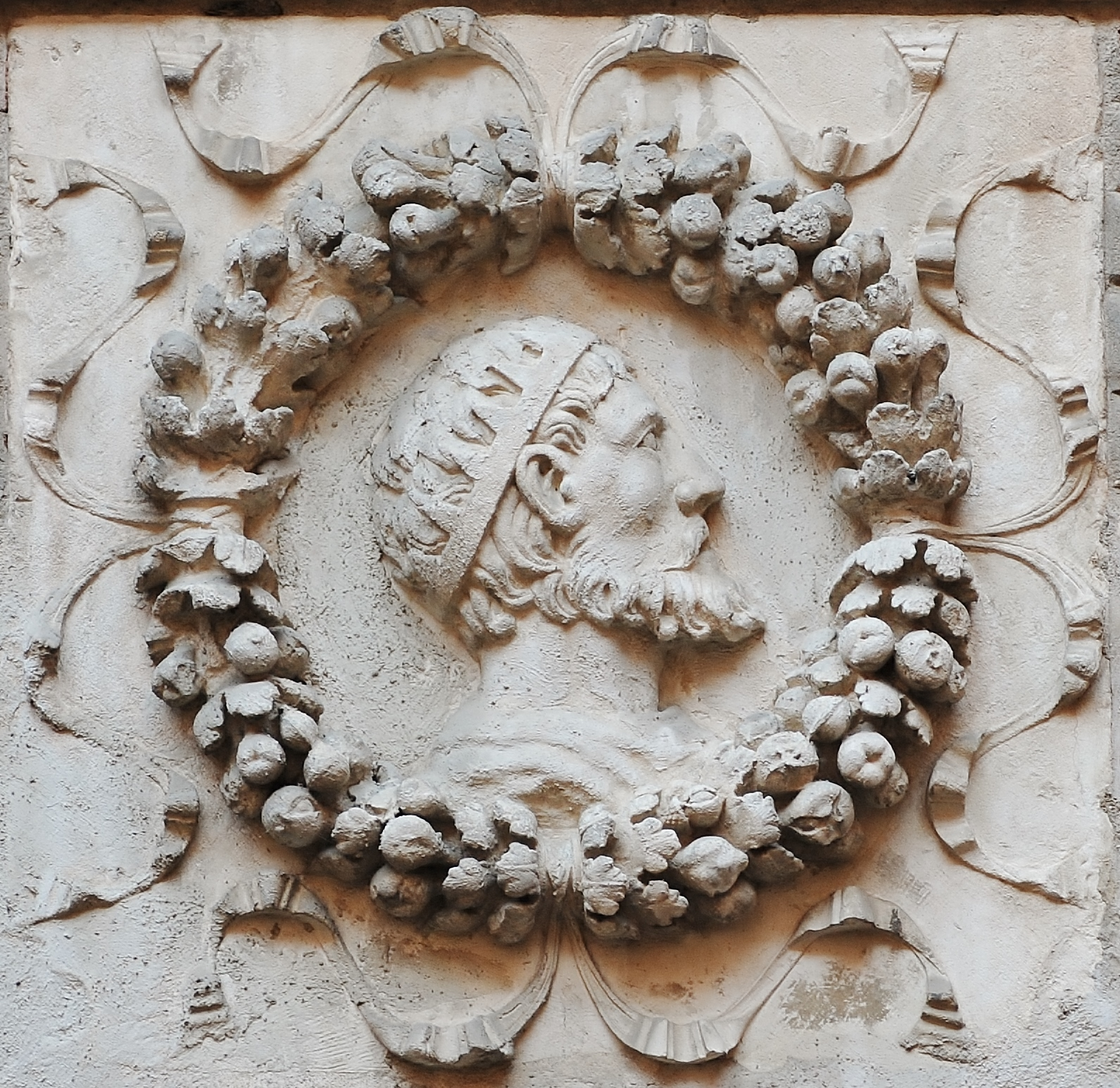
Hôtel Thomas de Montval (provenance: hôtel de Pins - Nicolas Bachelier).

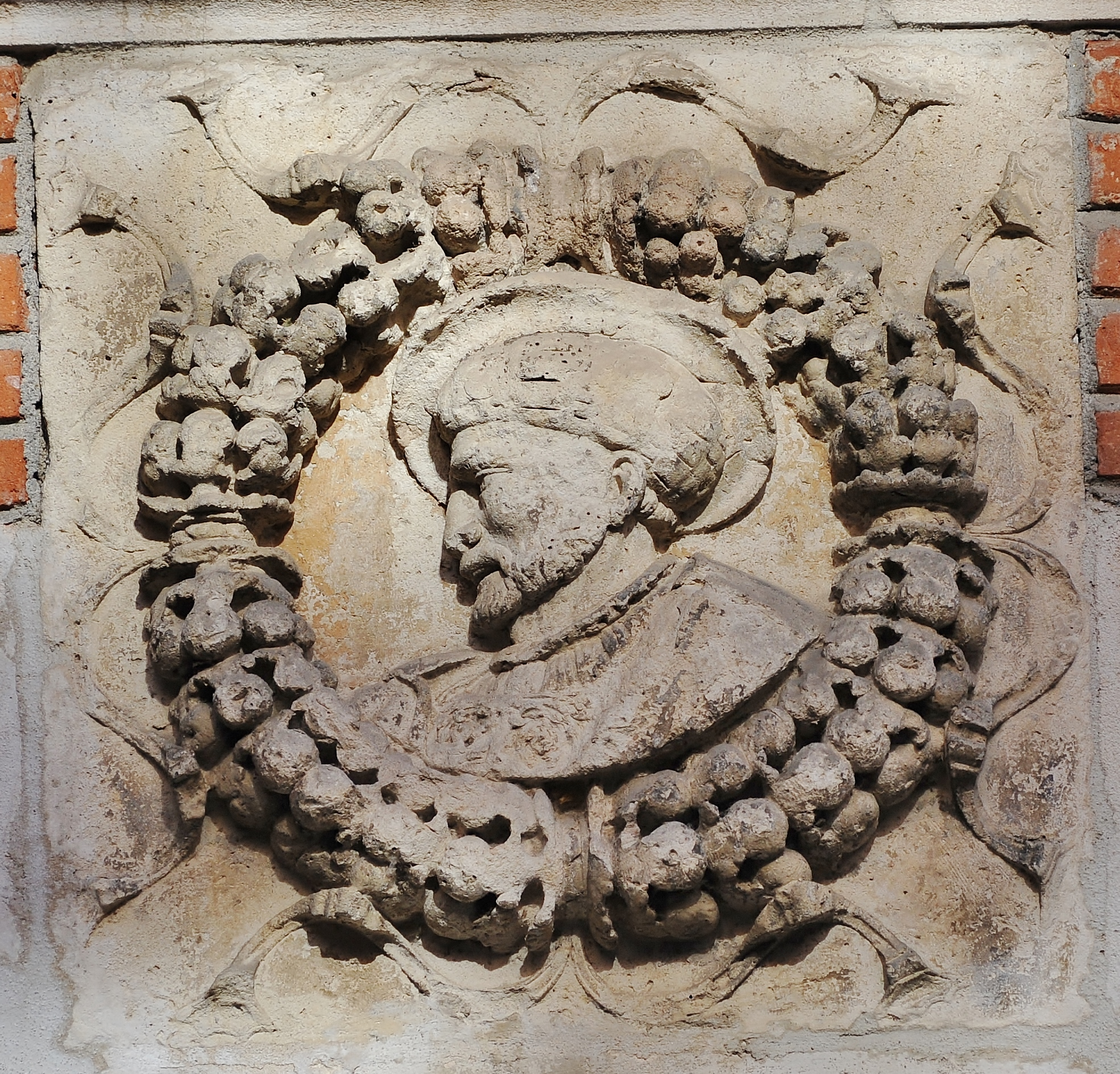
Hôtel Thomas de Montval (provenance: hôtel de Pins - Nicolas Bachelier).

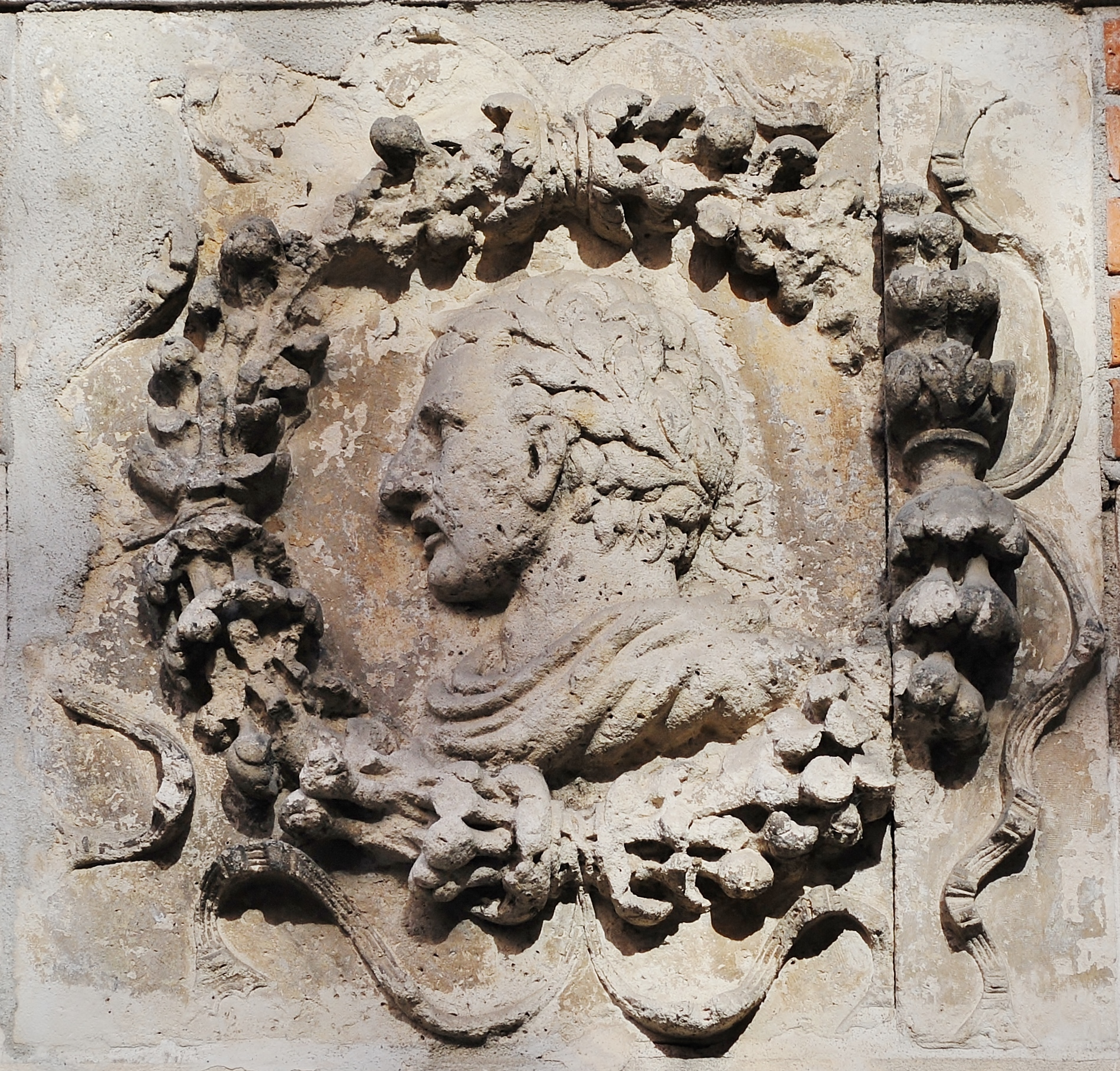
Hôtel Thomas de Montval (provenance: hôtel de Pins - Nicolas Bachelier).

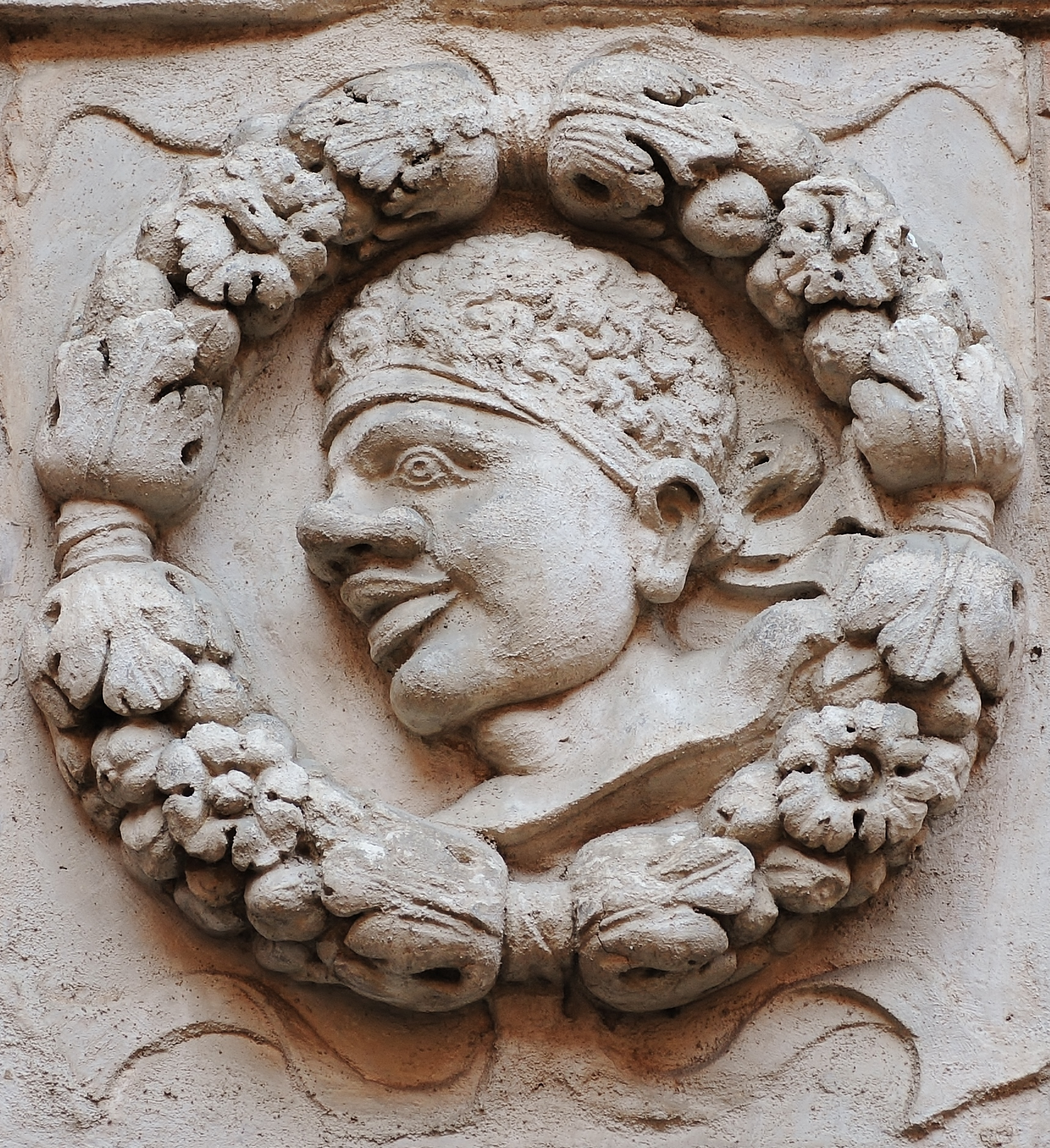
Hôtel Thomas de Montval (provenance: hôtel de Pins - Nicolas Bachelier).

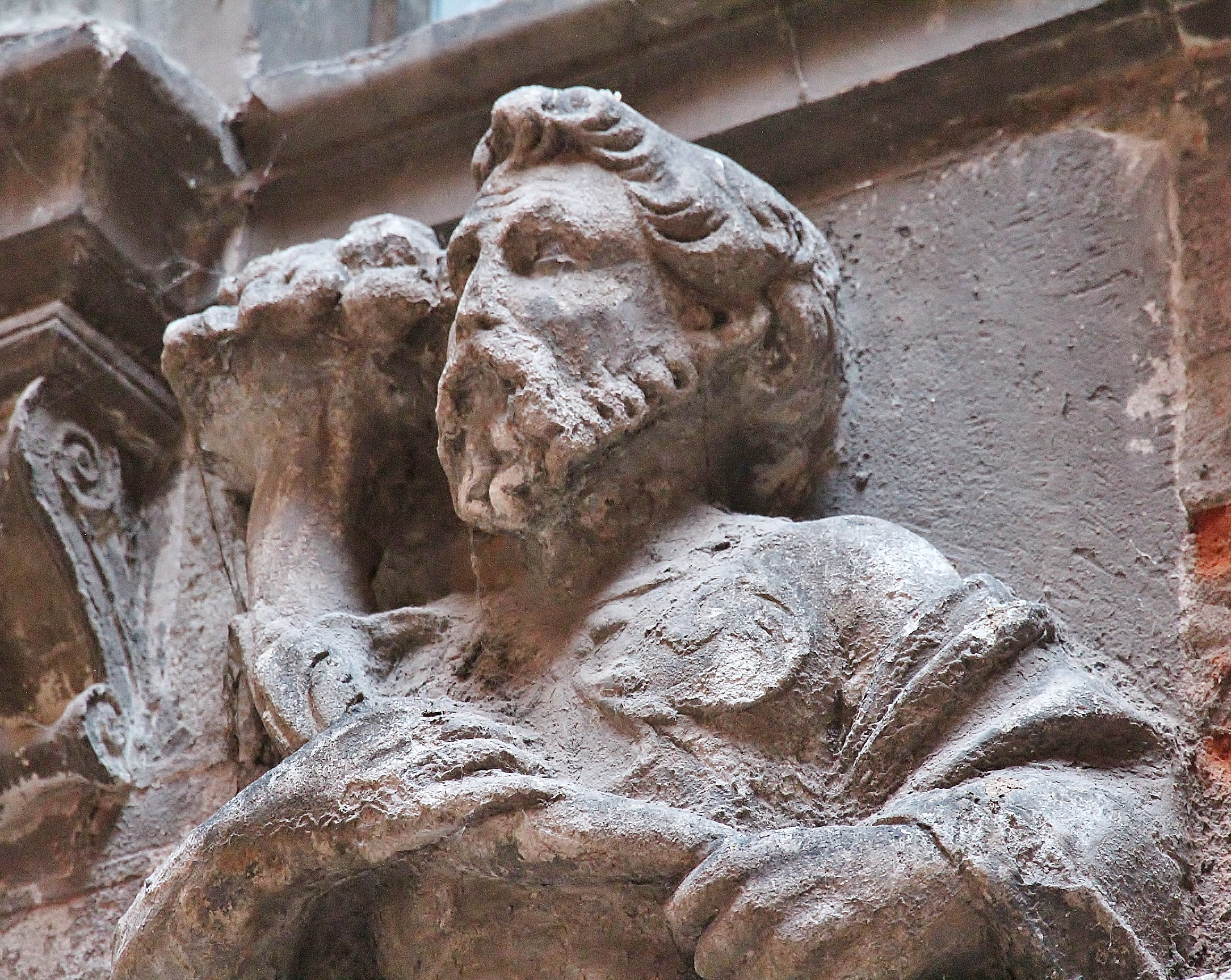
Bust at the Hôtel de Brucelles.

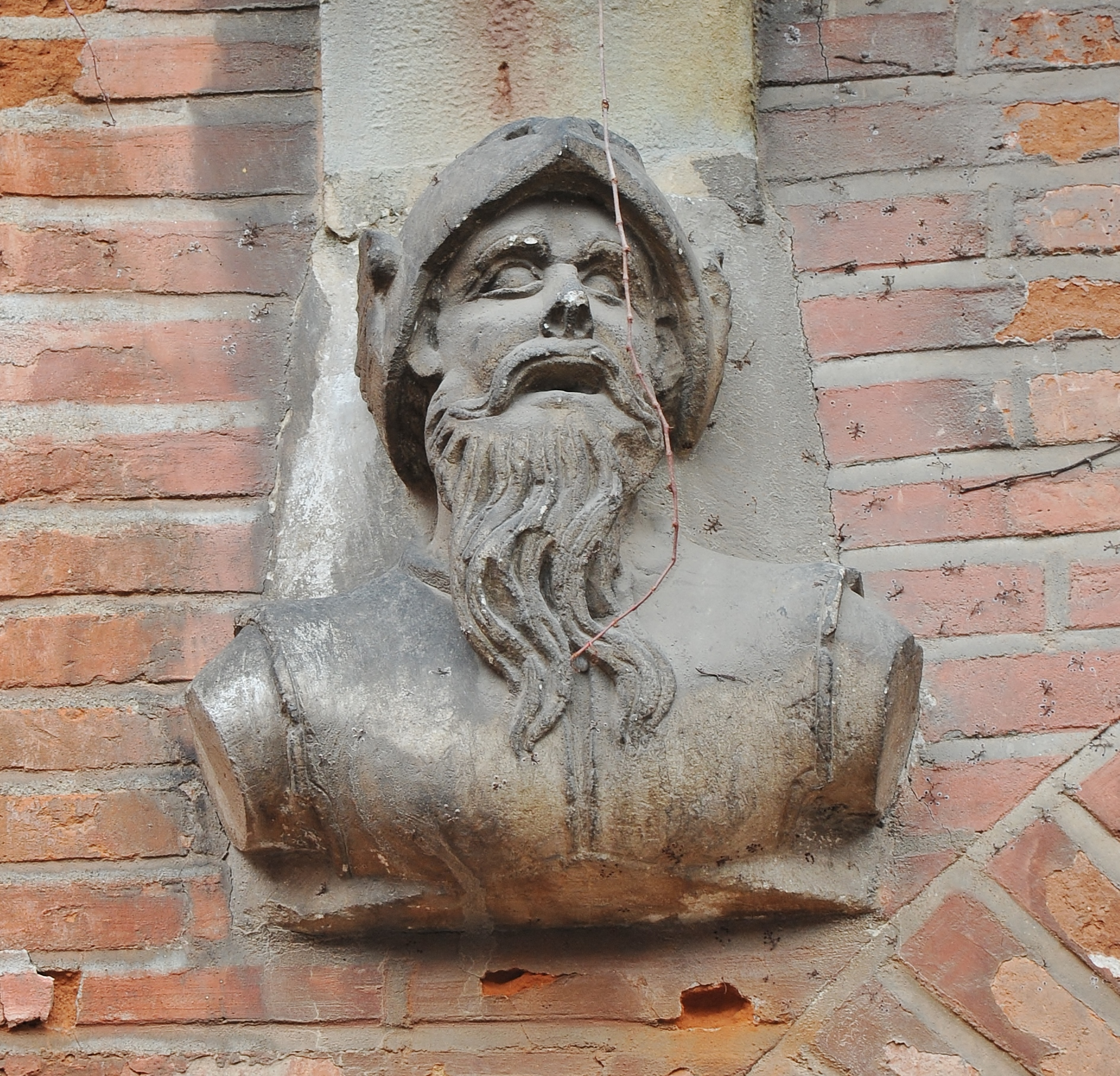
Bust at the Hôtel Pierre de Saint-Etienne (reuse of a previous Renaissance building).

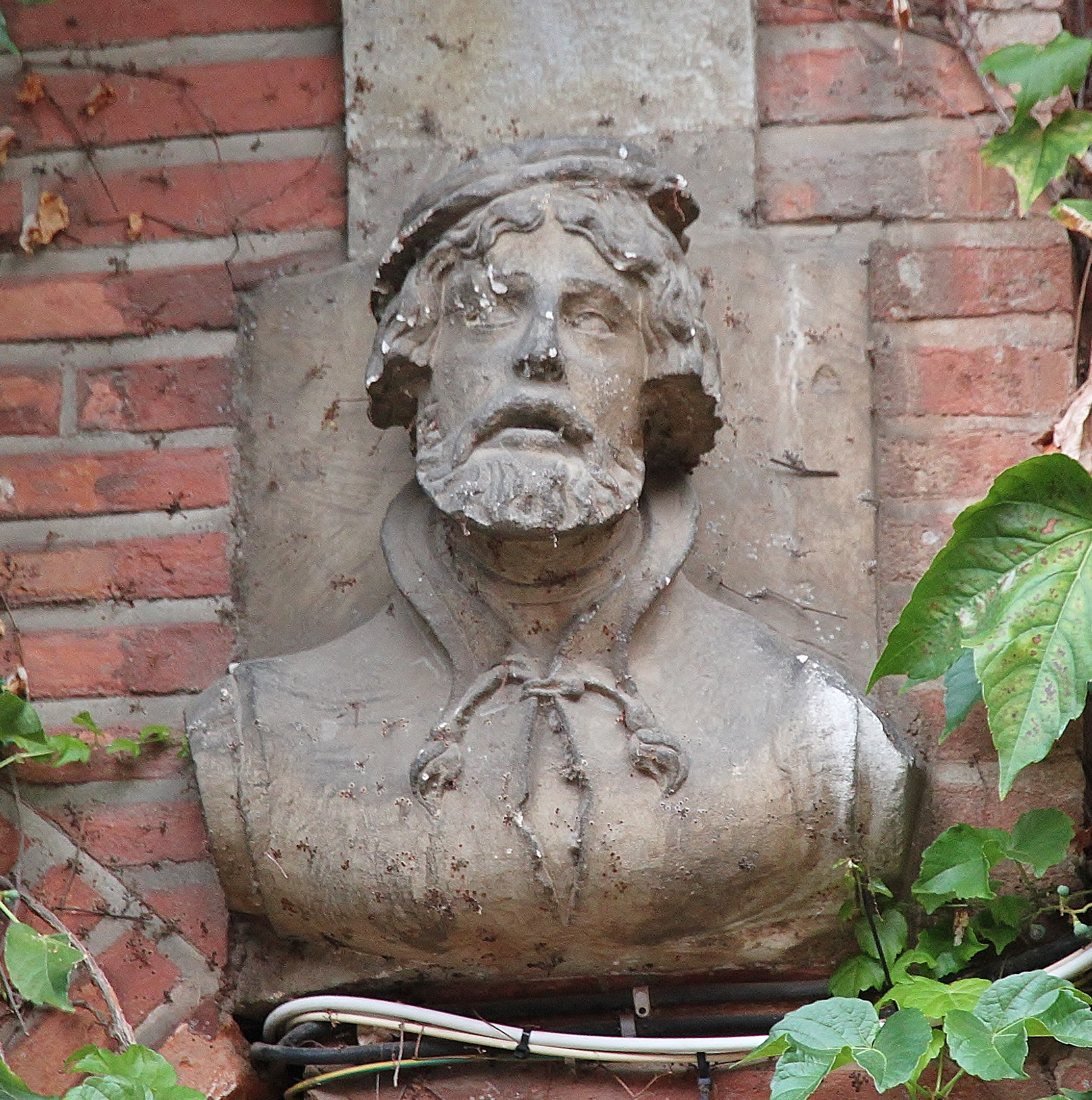
Bust at the Hôtel Pierre de Saint-Etienne (reuse of a previous Renaissance building).

=== Classical orders ===
Although several ornaments considered to be in the antique style (scrolls, candelabra, putti, medallions) were a great success as early as 1520, capitals referring directly to Classical orders, taken from book quotations, were carved in the 1530s.

The Ionic order of the gallery of the Hôtel de Pins, built around 1530, is thus taken from the edition of the Treatise of Vitruvius published by Cesariano in 1521. The design of its scroll is still imperfect, but this early manifestation of Vitruvian architecture must be credited to the commissioner, who had a brilliant diplomatic career in Milan at the time Cesariano was working on its edition.

The Corinthian order is encountered for the first time in Toulouse in the courtyard of the Hôtel de Bernuy (1530-1536), where Louis Privat draws inspiration from Sagredo for the Corinthian capitals. Nicolas Bachelier also refers to Sagredo for the Corinthian order of the capitals in the staircase of the Château de Castelnau-d'Estrétefonds (1539-1546), but also to Serlio for the capitals of the Hôtel d'Assézat.

Among the first Doric capitals to appear in Toulouse, those sculpted by Nicolas Bachelier in the staircase of the Hôtel de Bagis (1538-1545) are adapted from Serlio’s Regole generali (Book IV), whose publication was very recent at the time.

The Hôtel de Lamamye is the first manifestation in Toulouse (1540-1550) of the elevation of the three superimposed ancient orders: Doric on the lower floor, Ionic in the middle, and Corinthian on the upper floor.

At the Hôtel d'Assézat (1555–1556), the superimposition of orders over the entire height of the elevation and the presence of an attic evokes the model of the Colosseum, which was distributed through Serlio. The original use of twin columns in the city is in keeping with the search for an "enrichment" aesthetic that follows the ancient model, while echoing the mid-century architecture of the kingdom's greats. As the careful treatment of the shafts and capitals underlines, the most sophisticated antique expression systematically nourished the sculptor's invention (Nicolas Bachelier). Doric is, for example, through Serlio or Labacco, an allusion to his most ornate known version, that of the Basilica Aemilia.

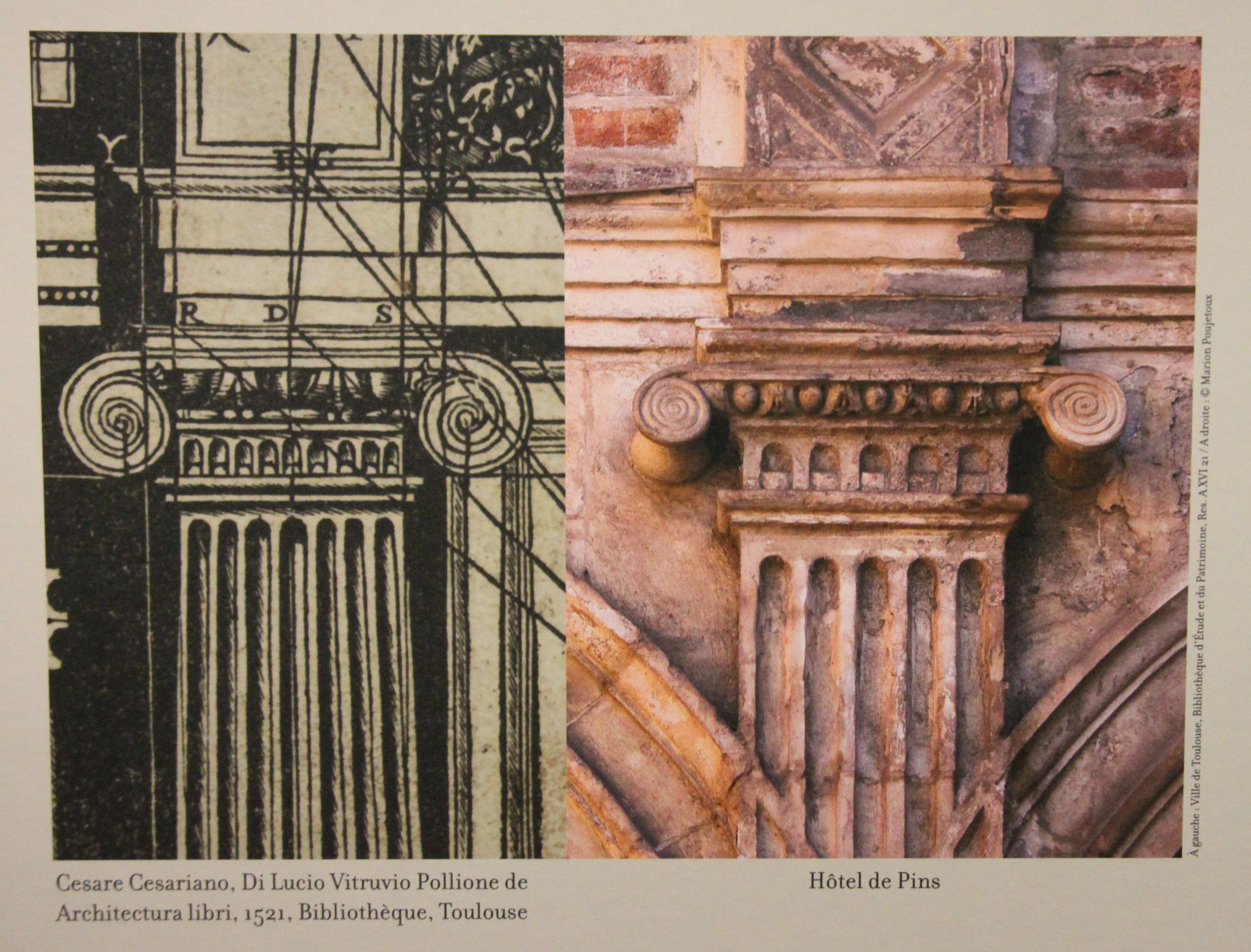
Relationship between a drawing by Cesariano of 1521 and the Ionic capitals of the Hôtel de Pins (circa 1530).

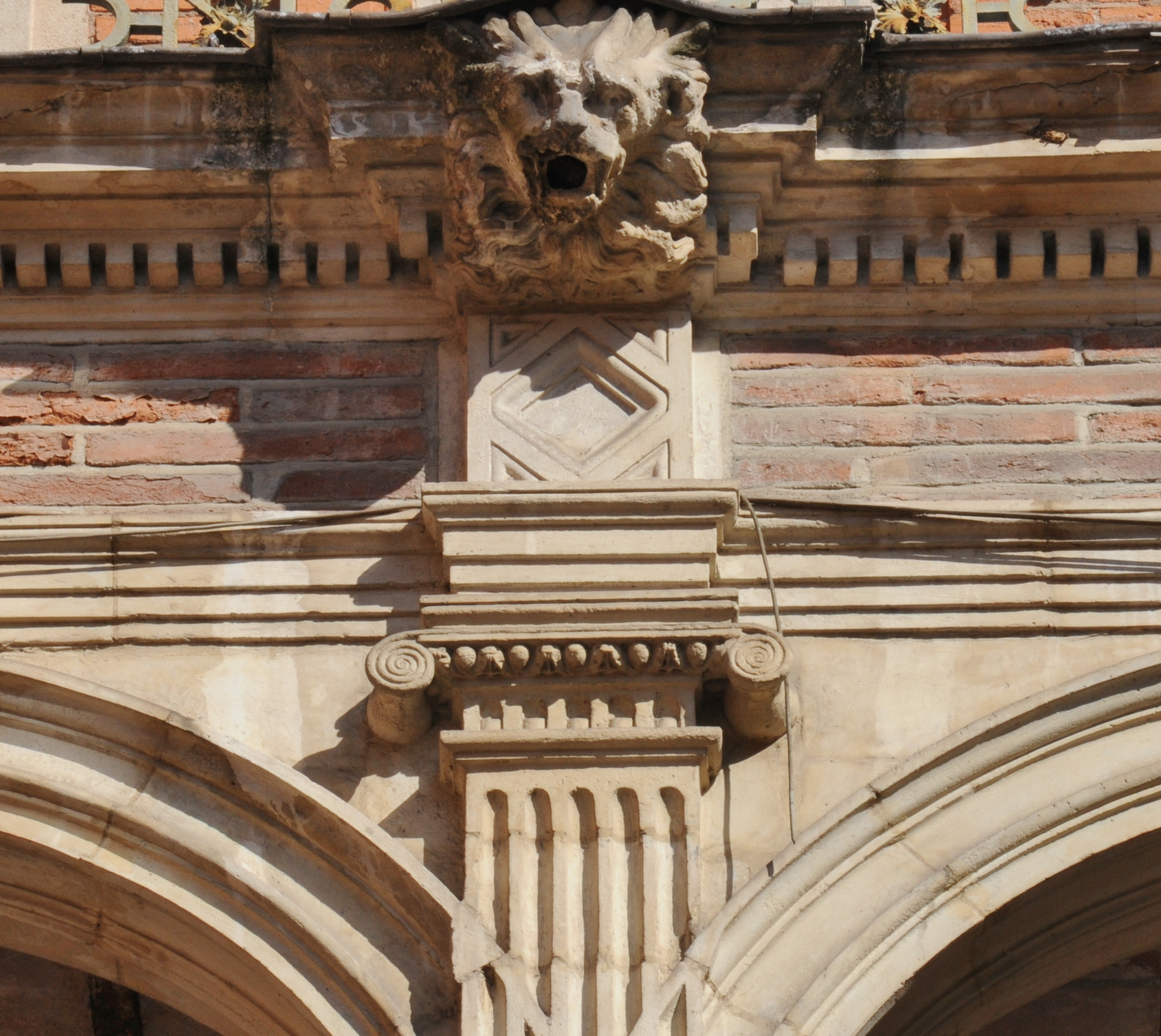
Ionic capital at the Hôtel de Pins.

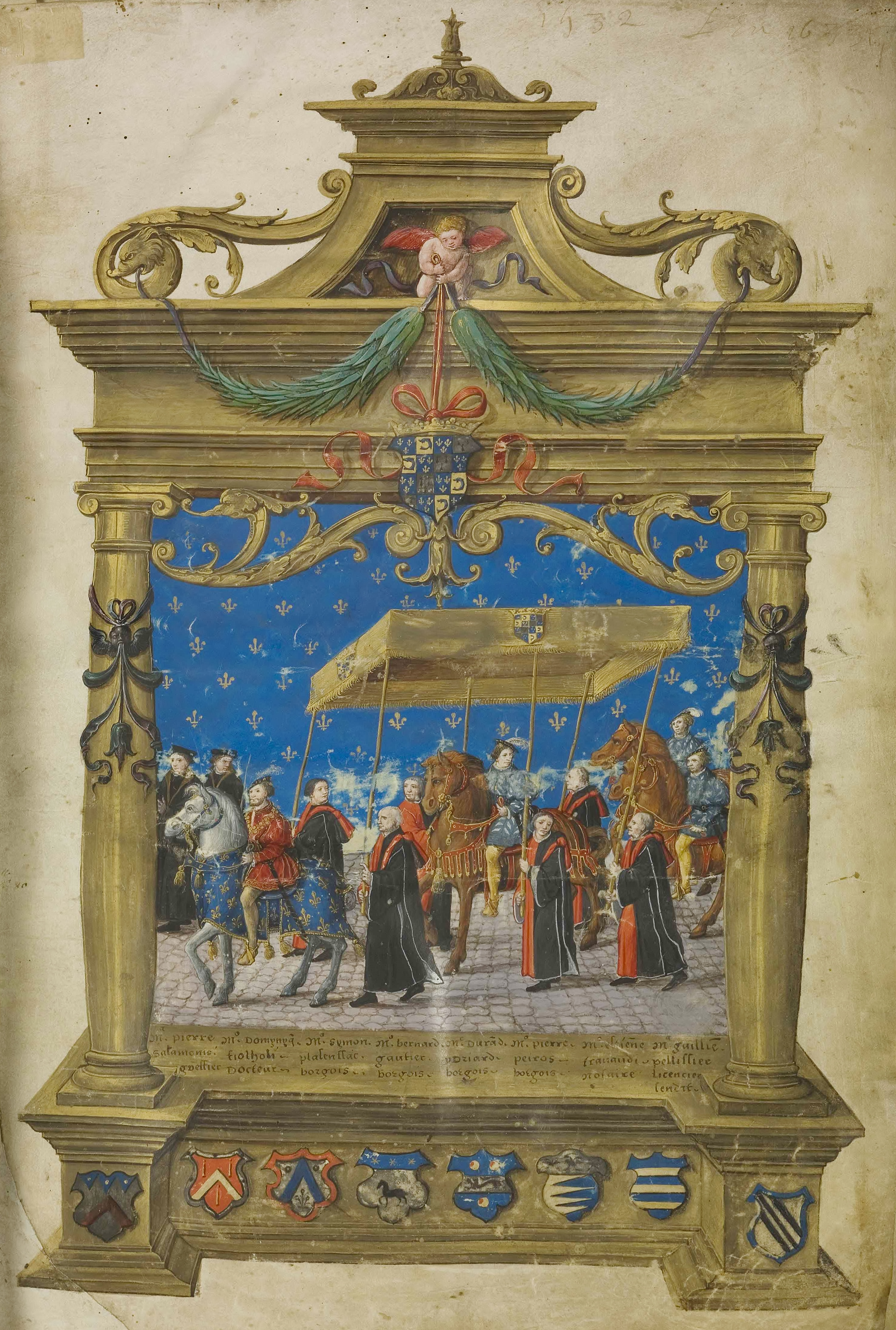
Ionic capitals depicted on an illumination from the Handwritten Annals of the City of Toulouse (1532–1533).

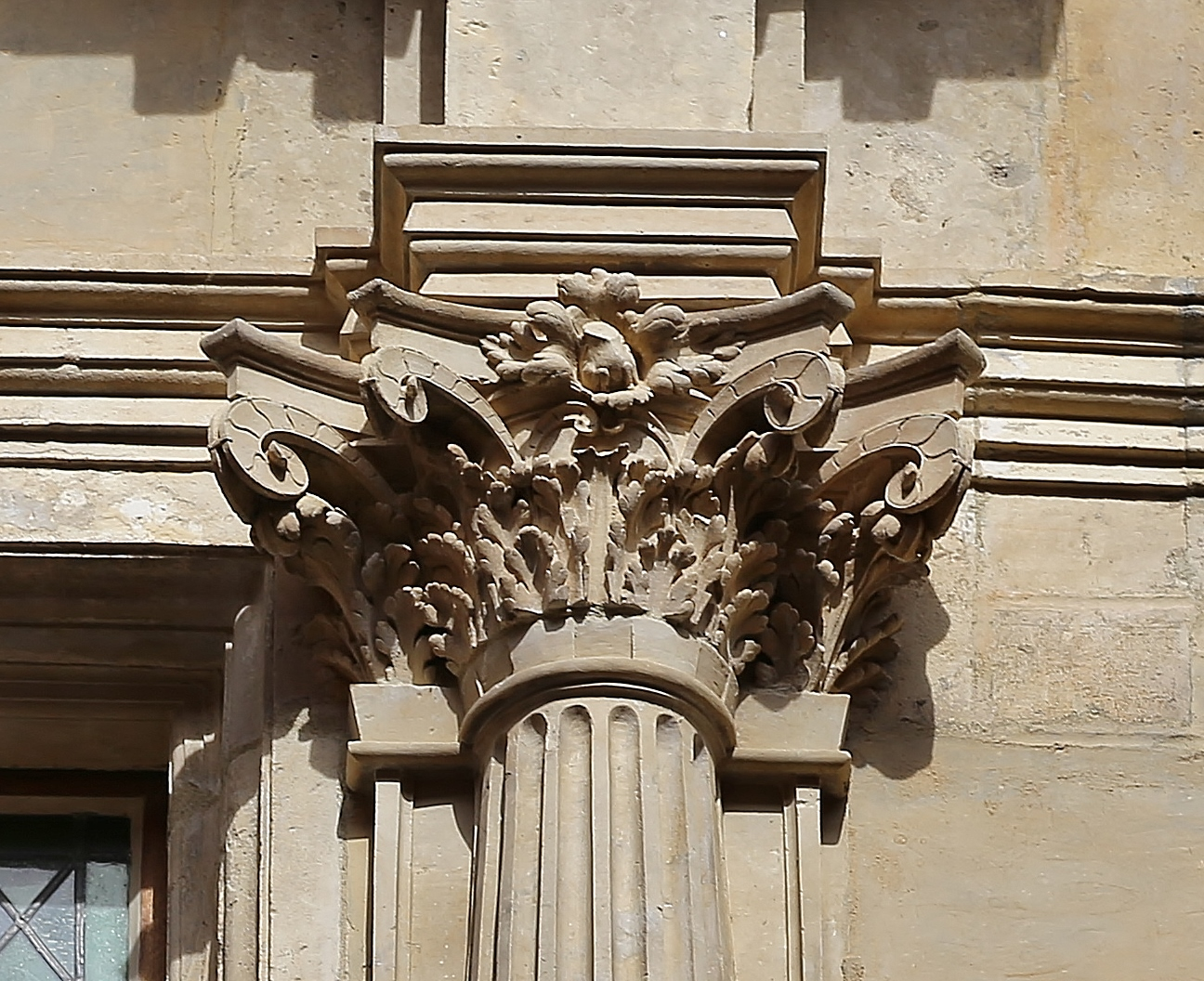
Corinthian column at the Hôtel de Bernuy.

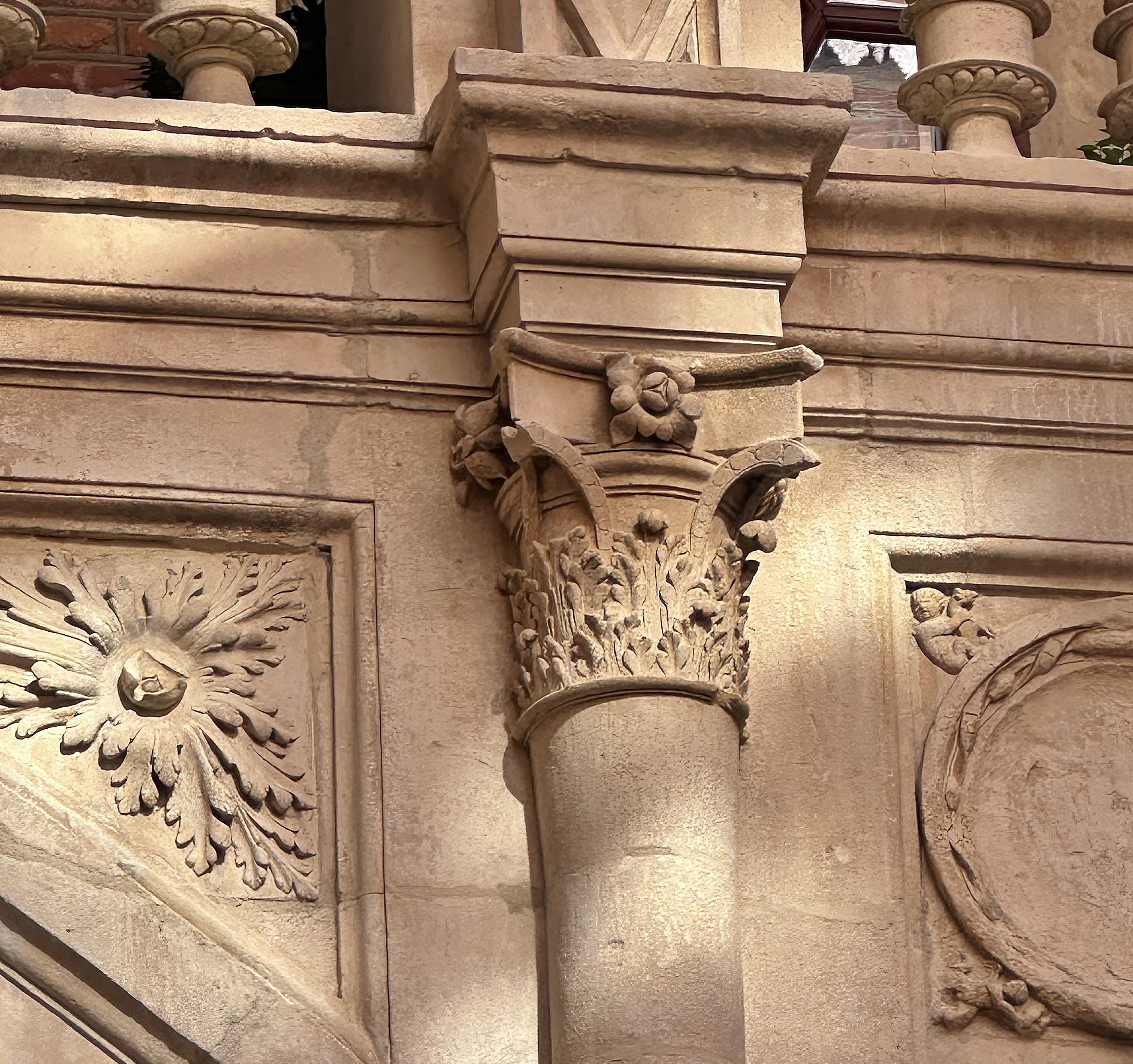
Corinthian capital at the Hôtel de Bernuy.

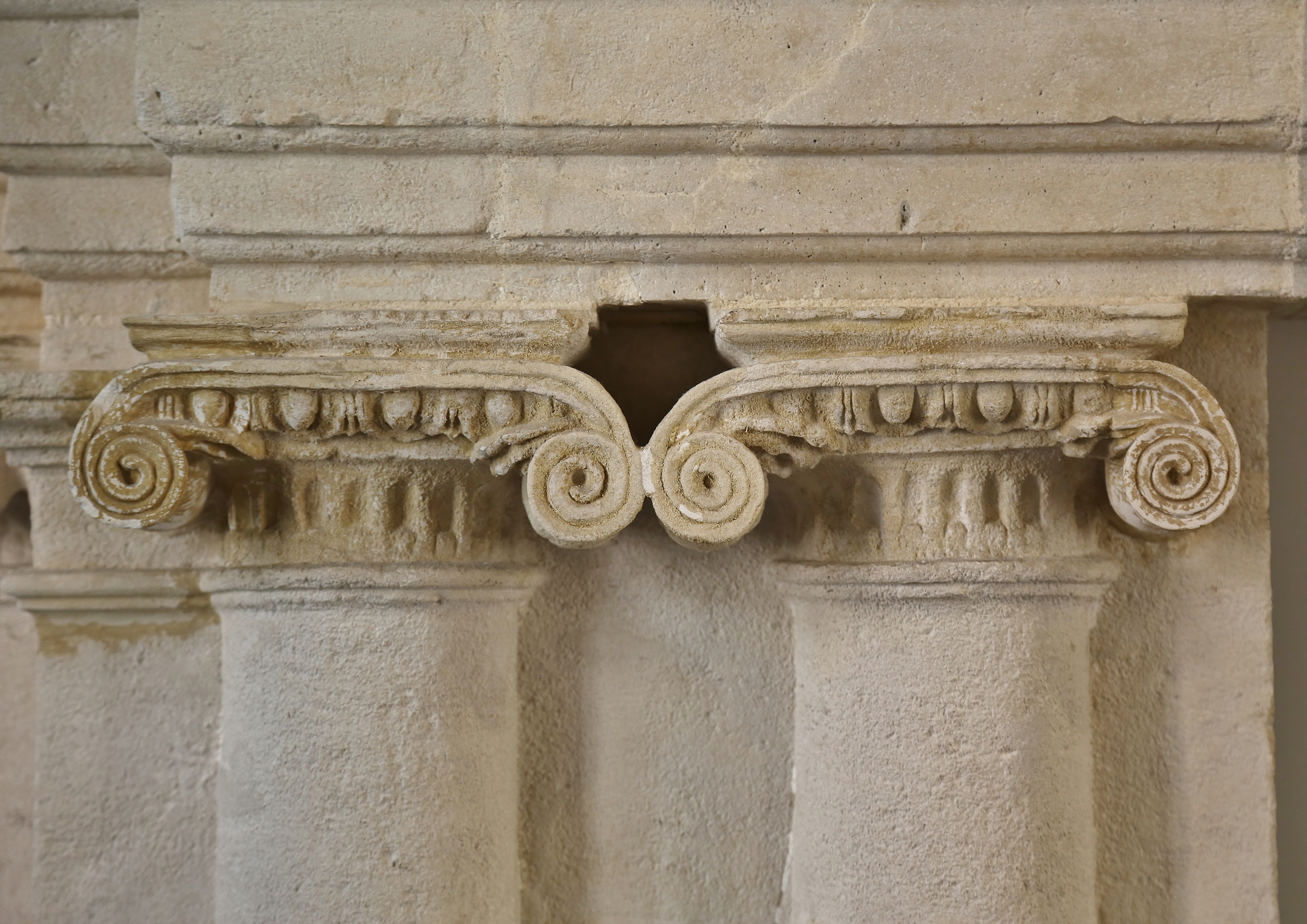
Ionic capitals of the fireplace of the Tornié hotel.

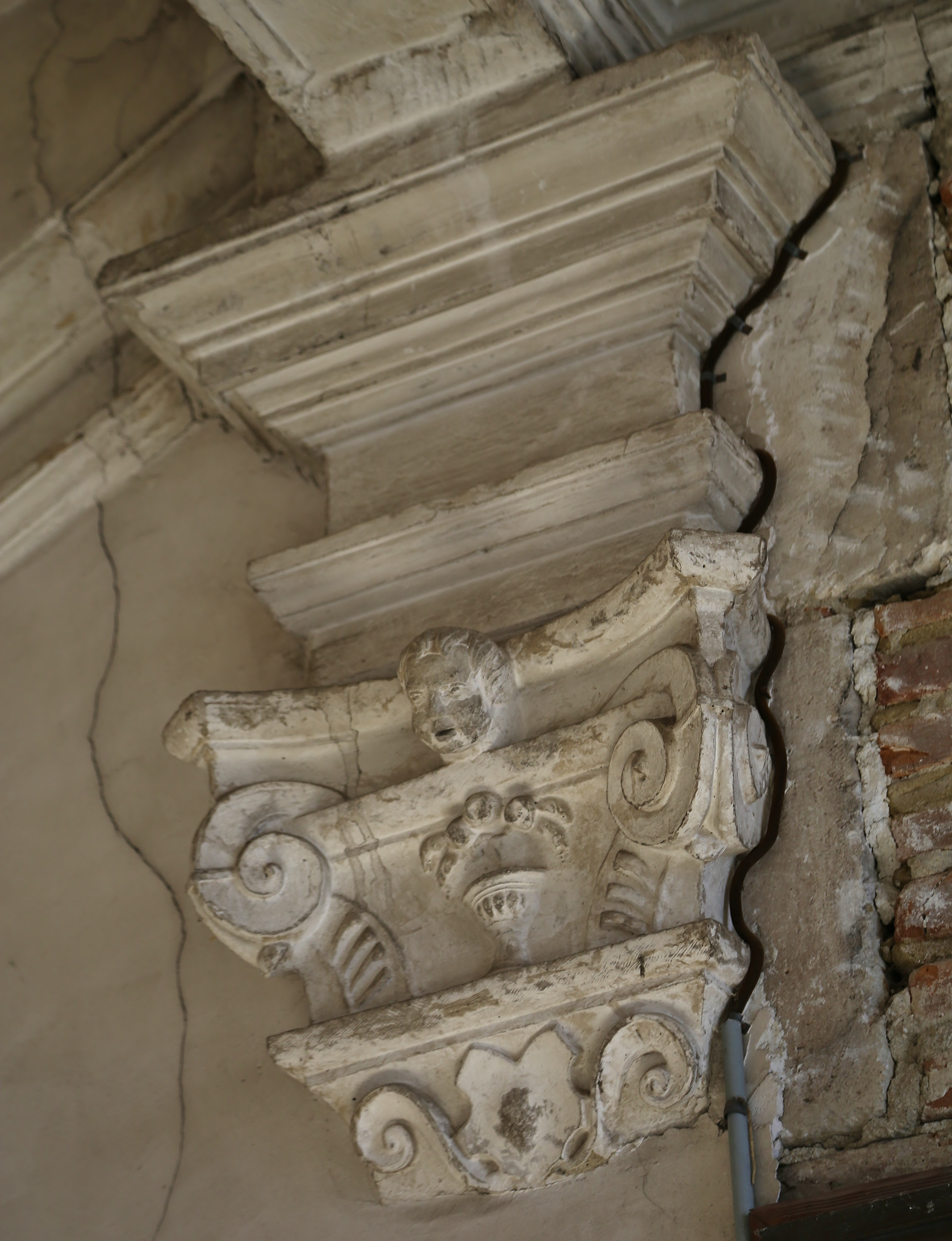
Doric capital in the staircase of the Ulmo hotel.

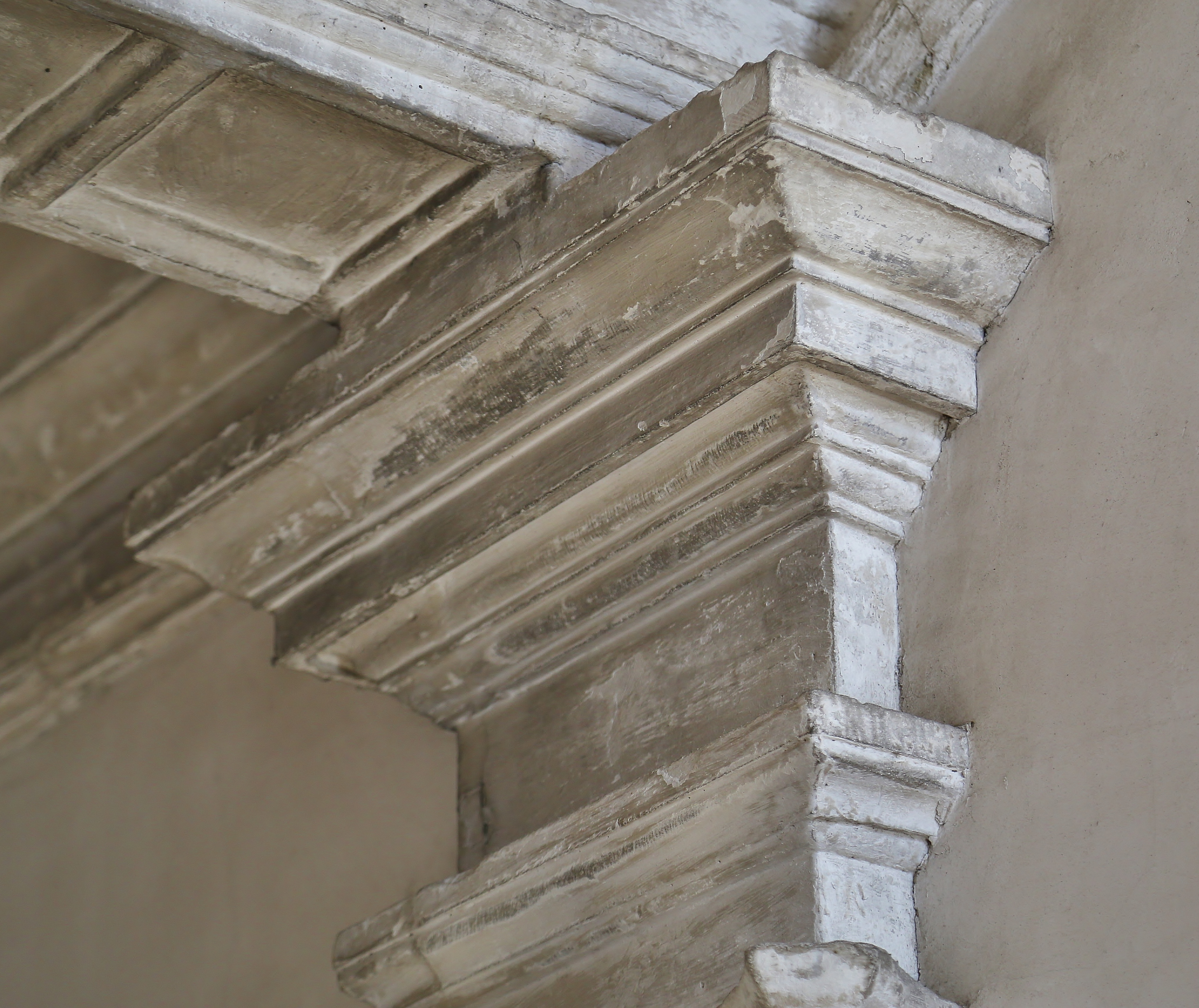
Detail of a Doric capital in the staircase of the Ulmo hotel.

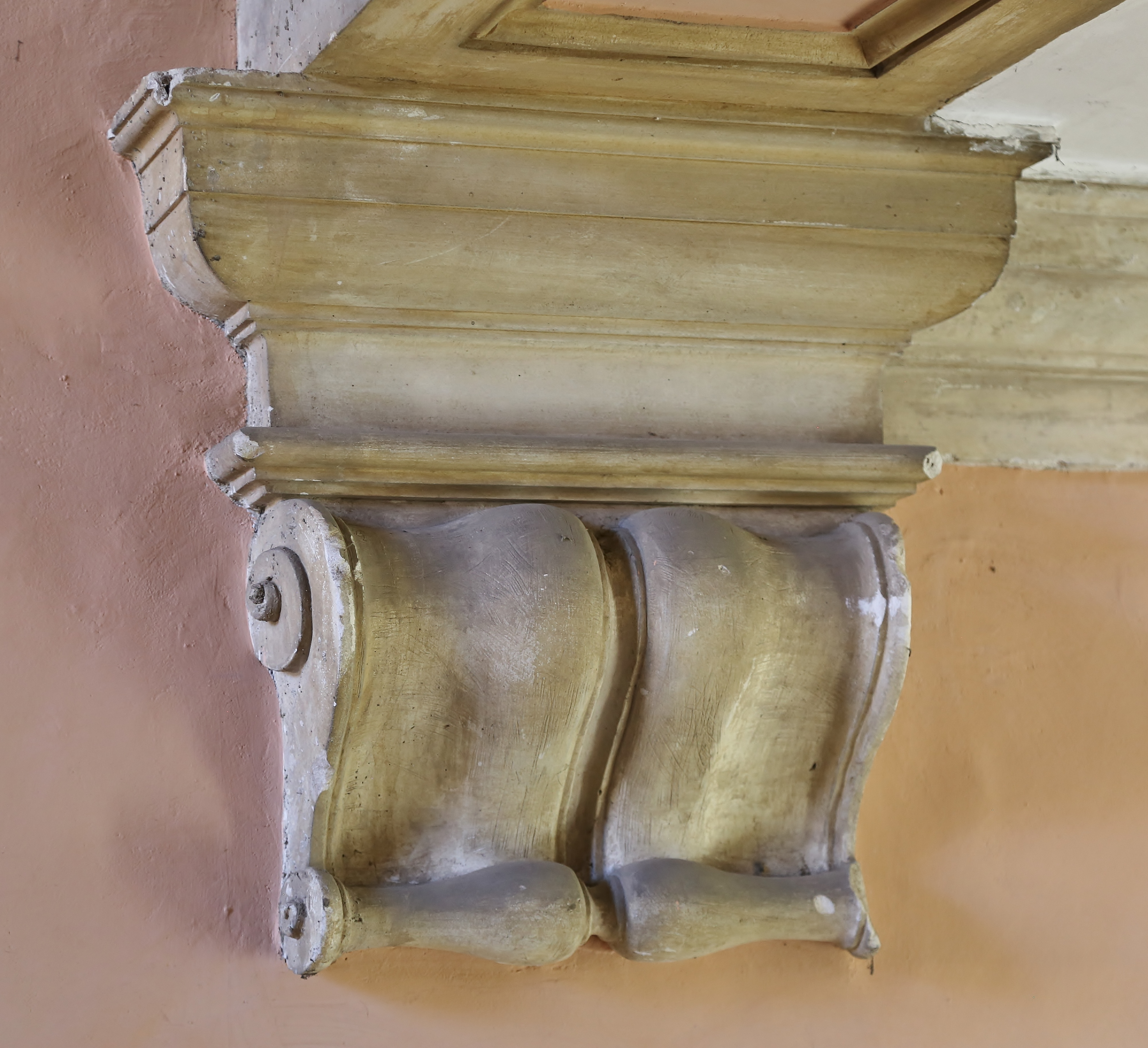
Doric capital in the staircase of the Bagis hotel.

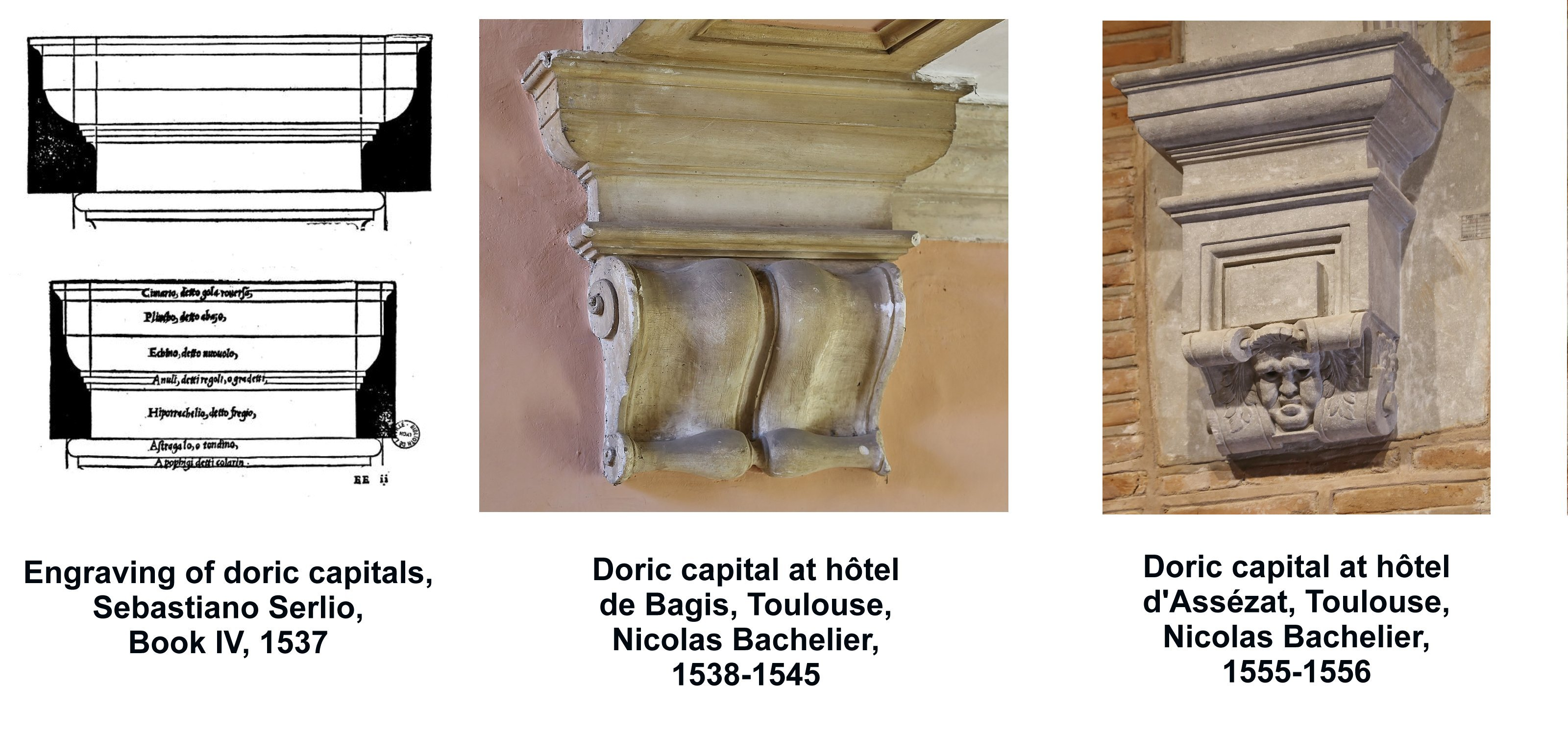
Influence of Serlio on the productions of Nicolas Bachelier.

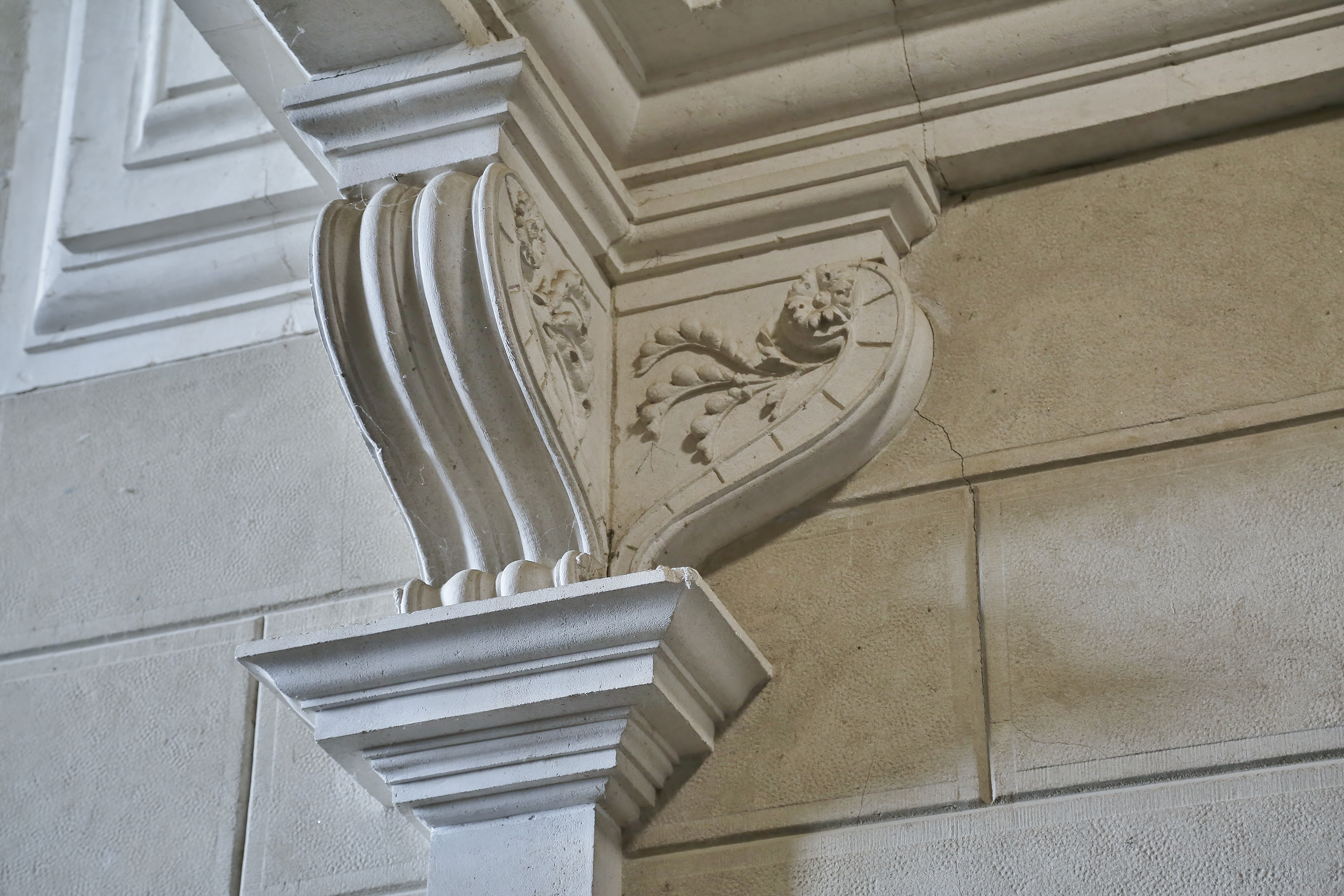
Doric capital and consoles with seed pods at the Château de Castelnau-d'Estrétefonds.

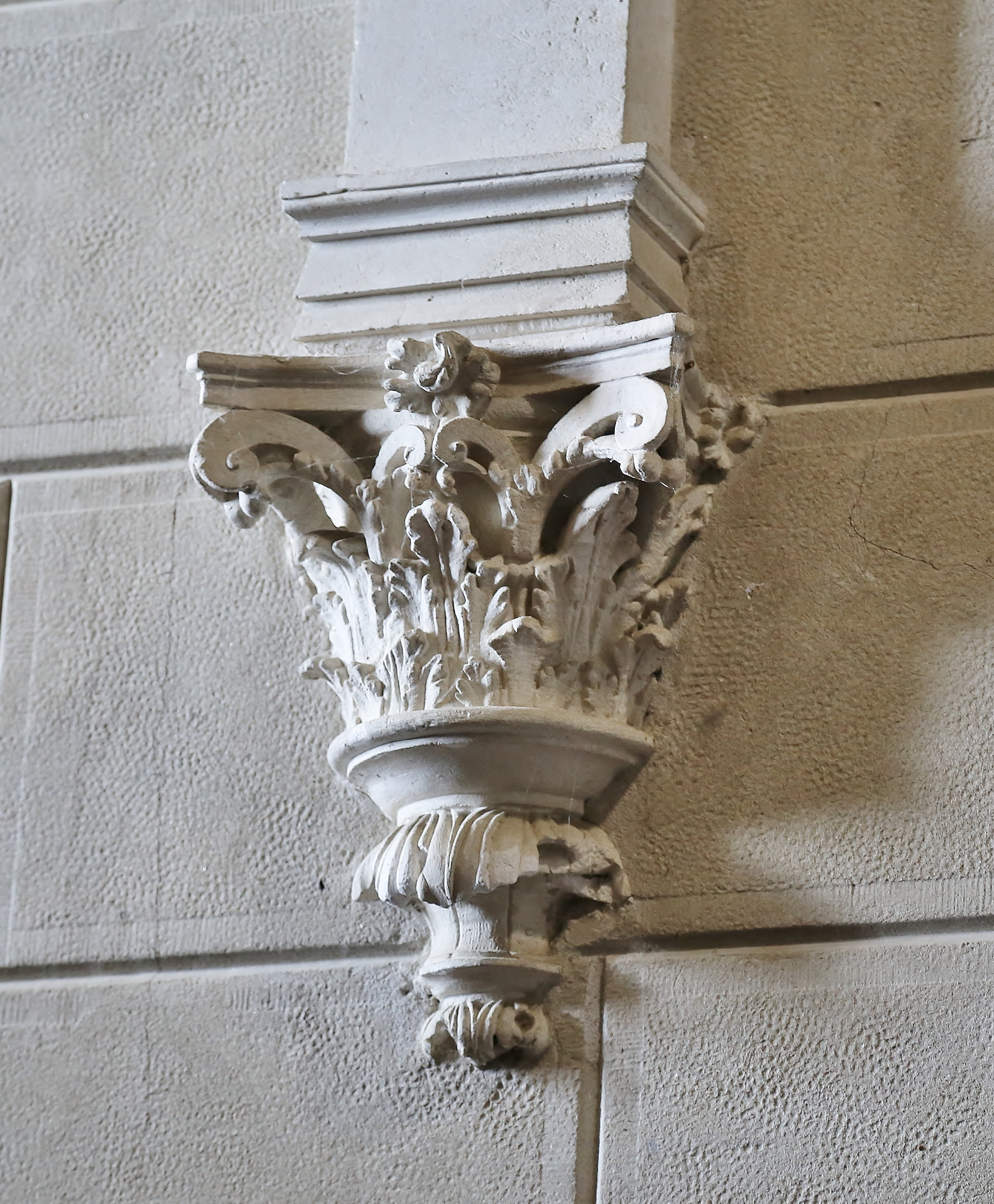
Nicolas Bachelier draws inspiration from Sagredo's engravings for the Corinthian capitals of the Château de Castelnau-d'Estrétefonds.

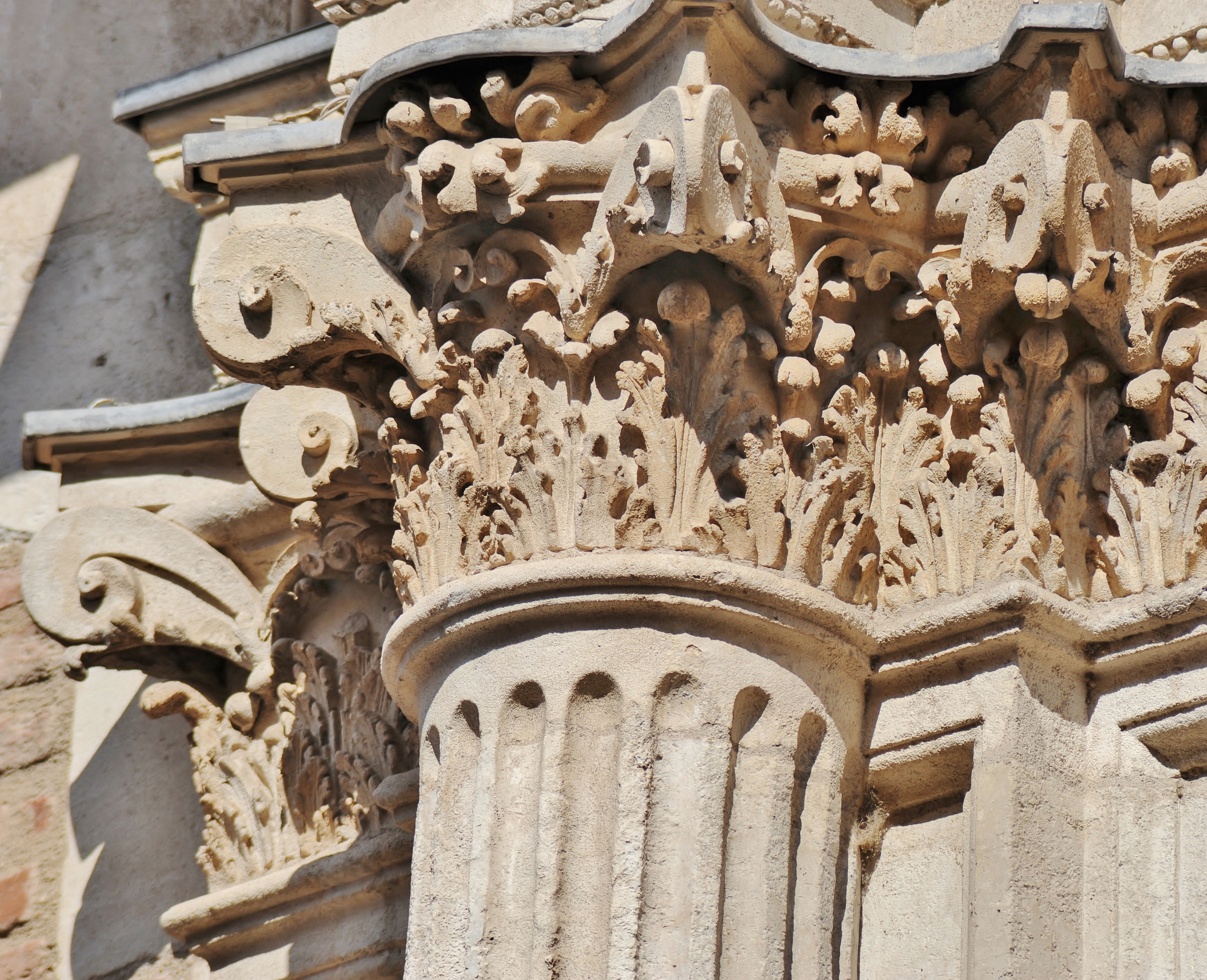
Corinthian capital at the Dalbade church.

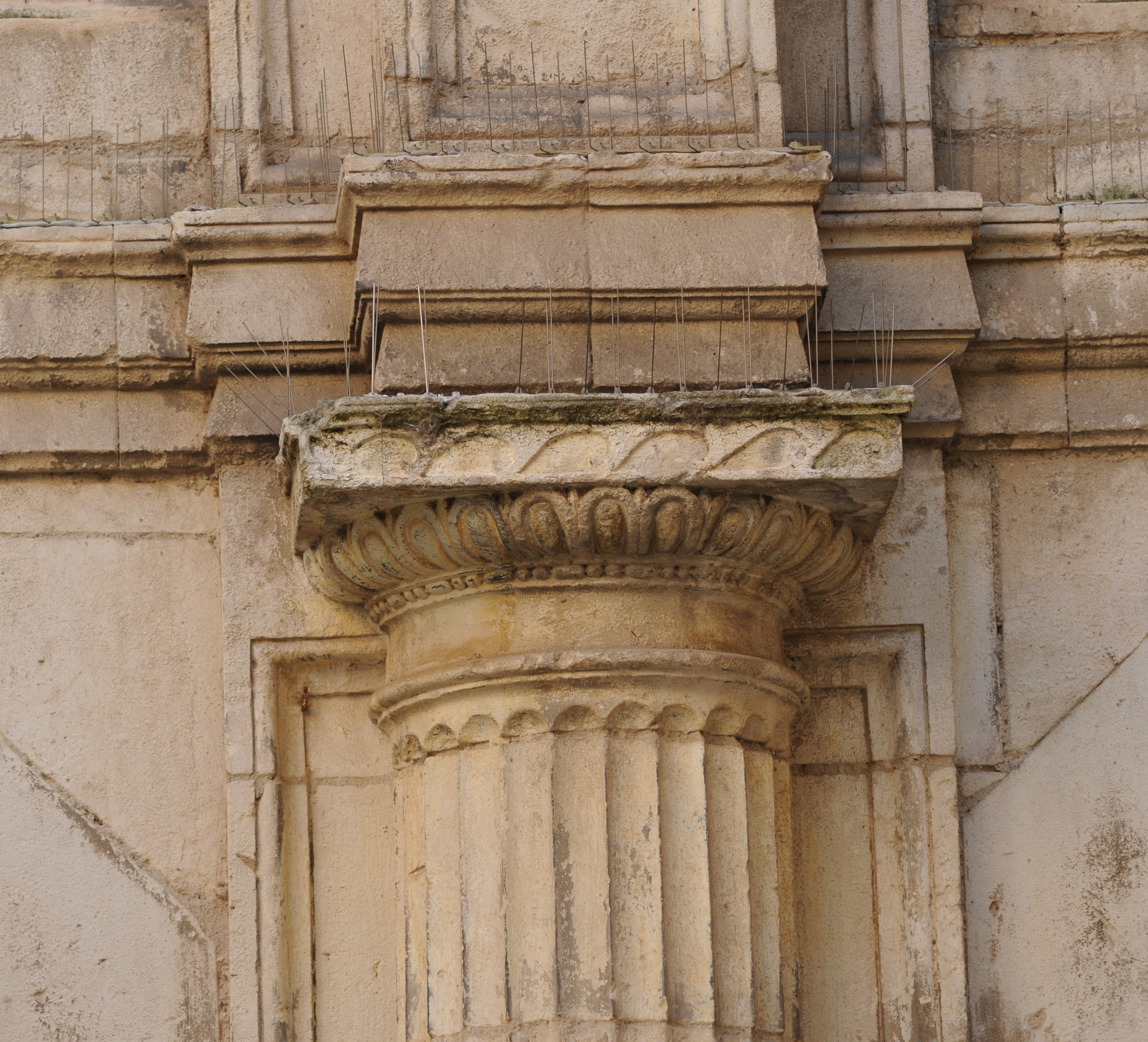
Doric capital at the Hôtel de Lamamye.

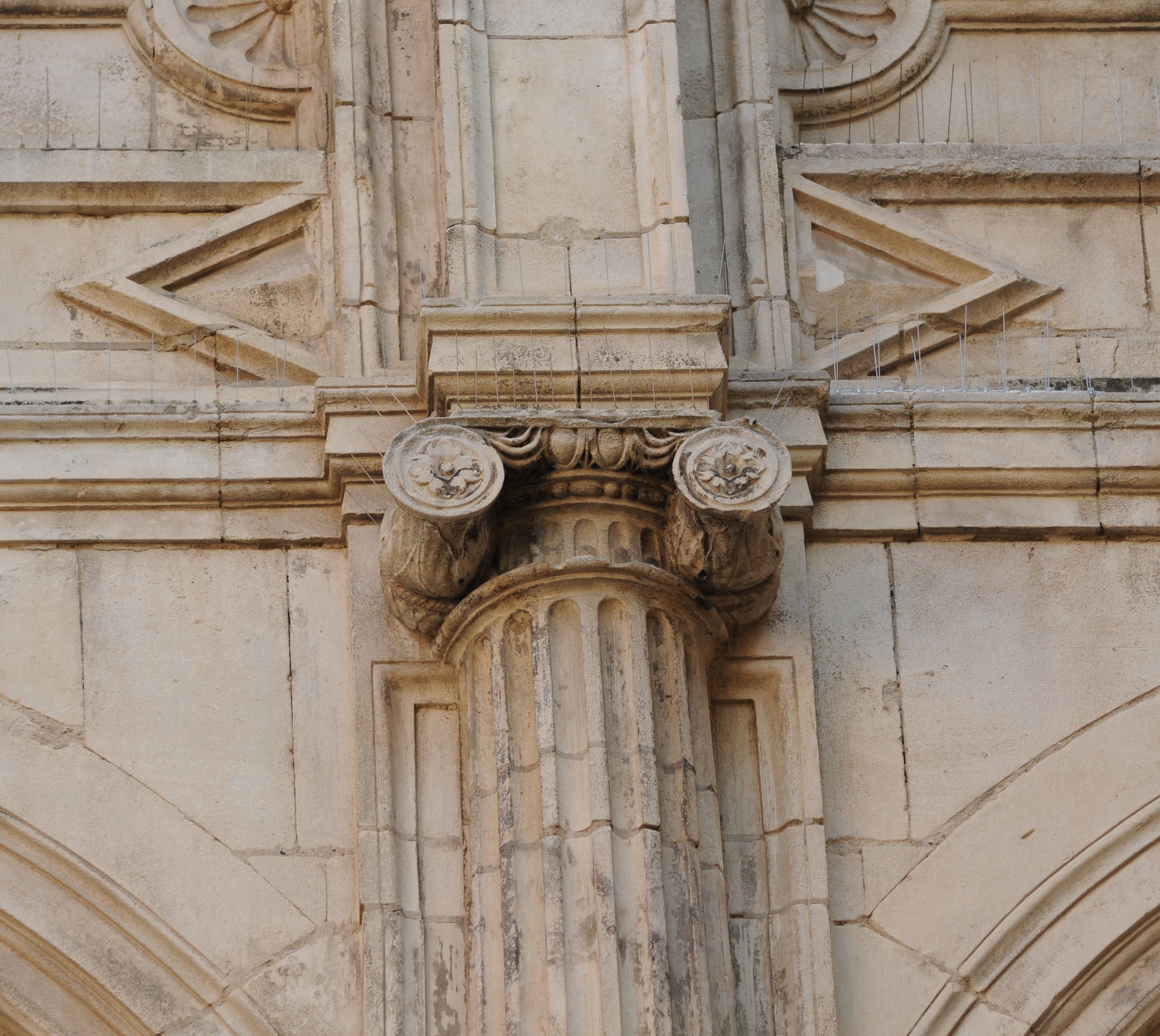
Ionic capital at the Hôtel de Lamamye.

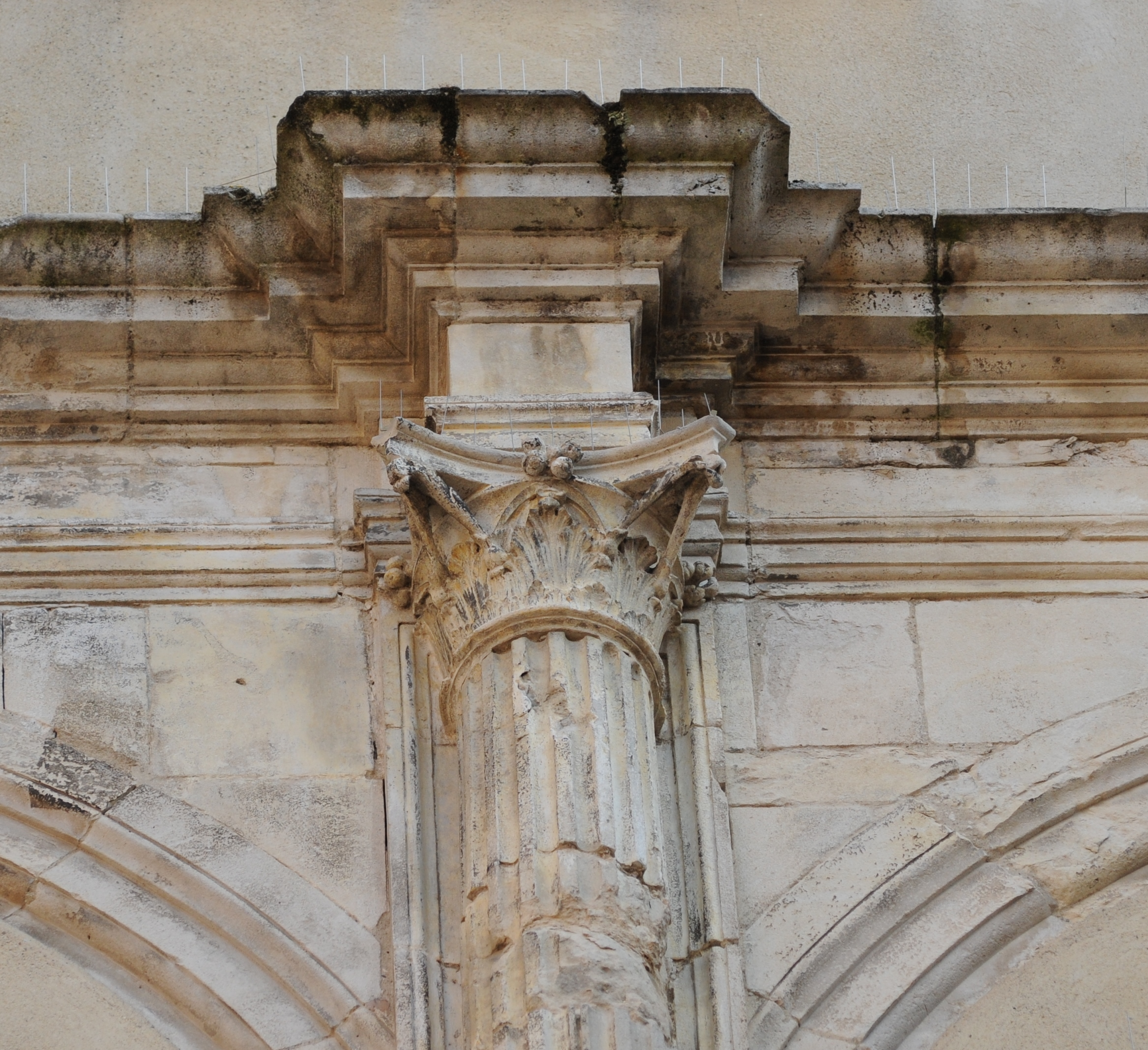
Corinthian capital at the Hôtel de Lamamye.

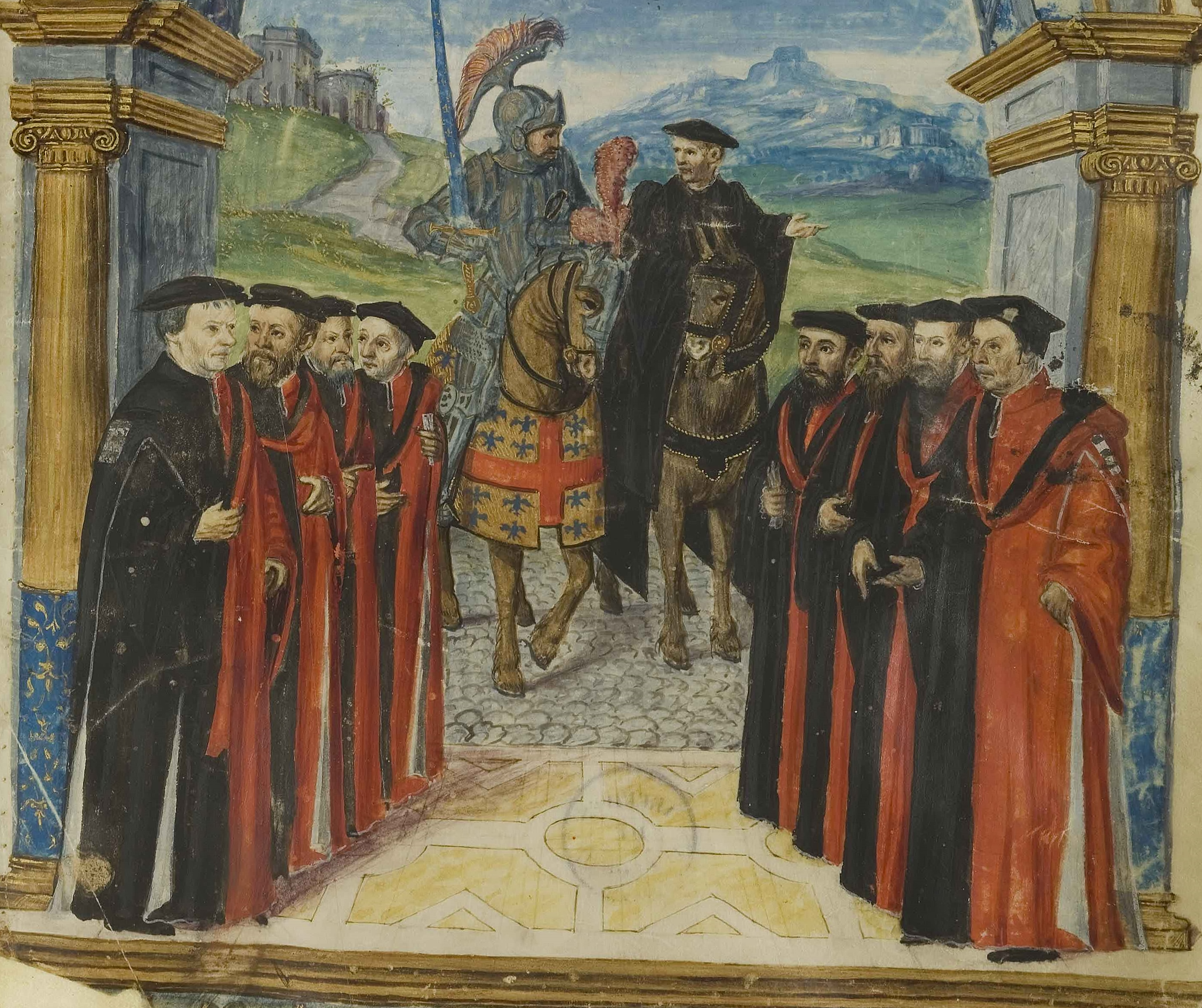
Ionic capitals depicted on an illumination from the Handwritten Annals of the City of Toulouse (1550–1551).

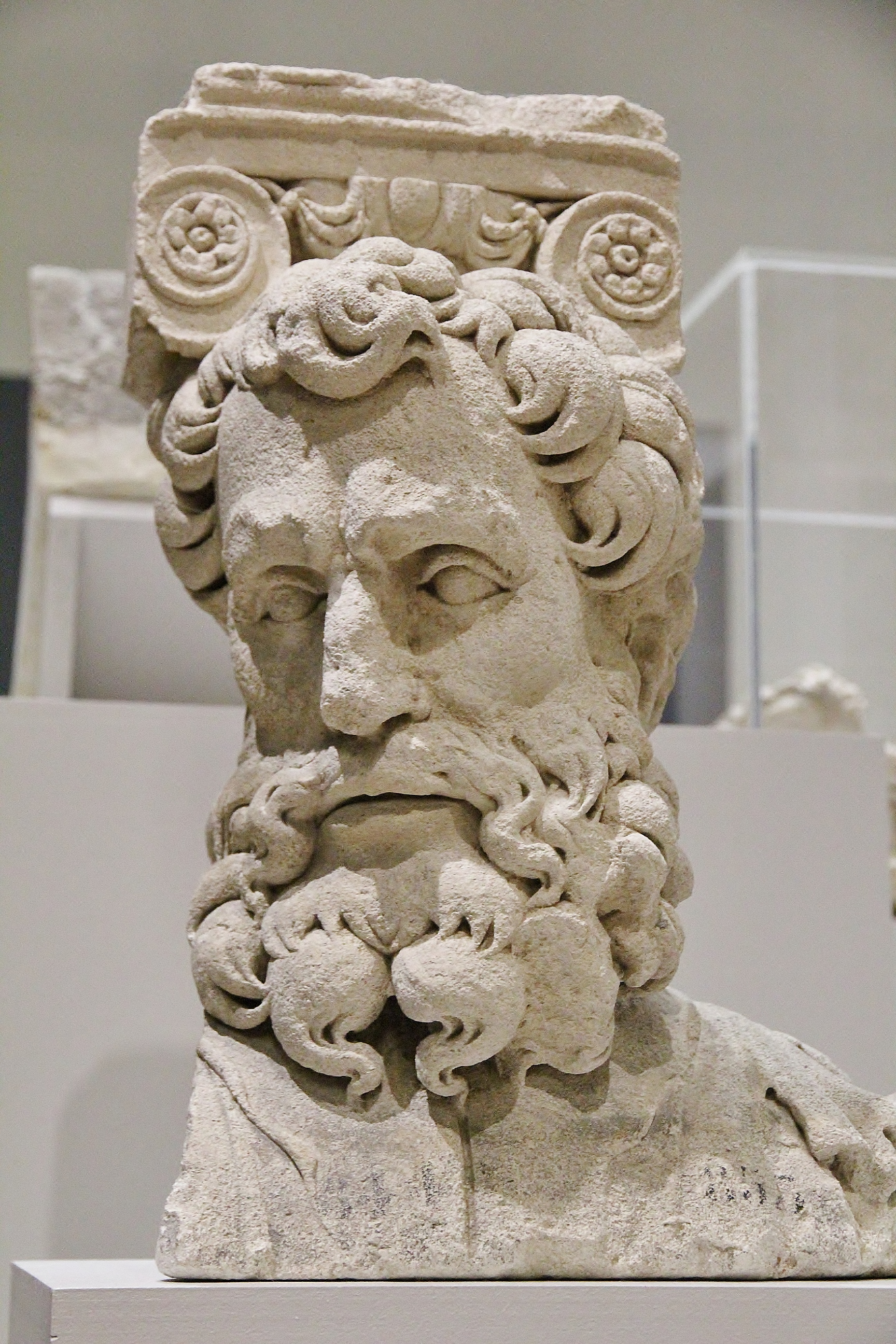
Ionic capital on fragment of anthropomorphic column, probably from a portal.

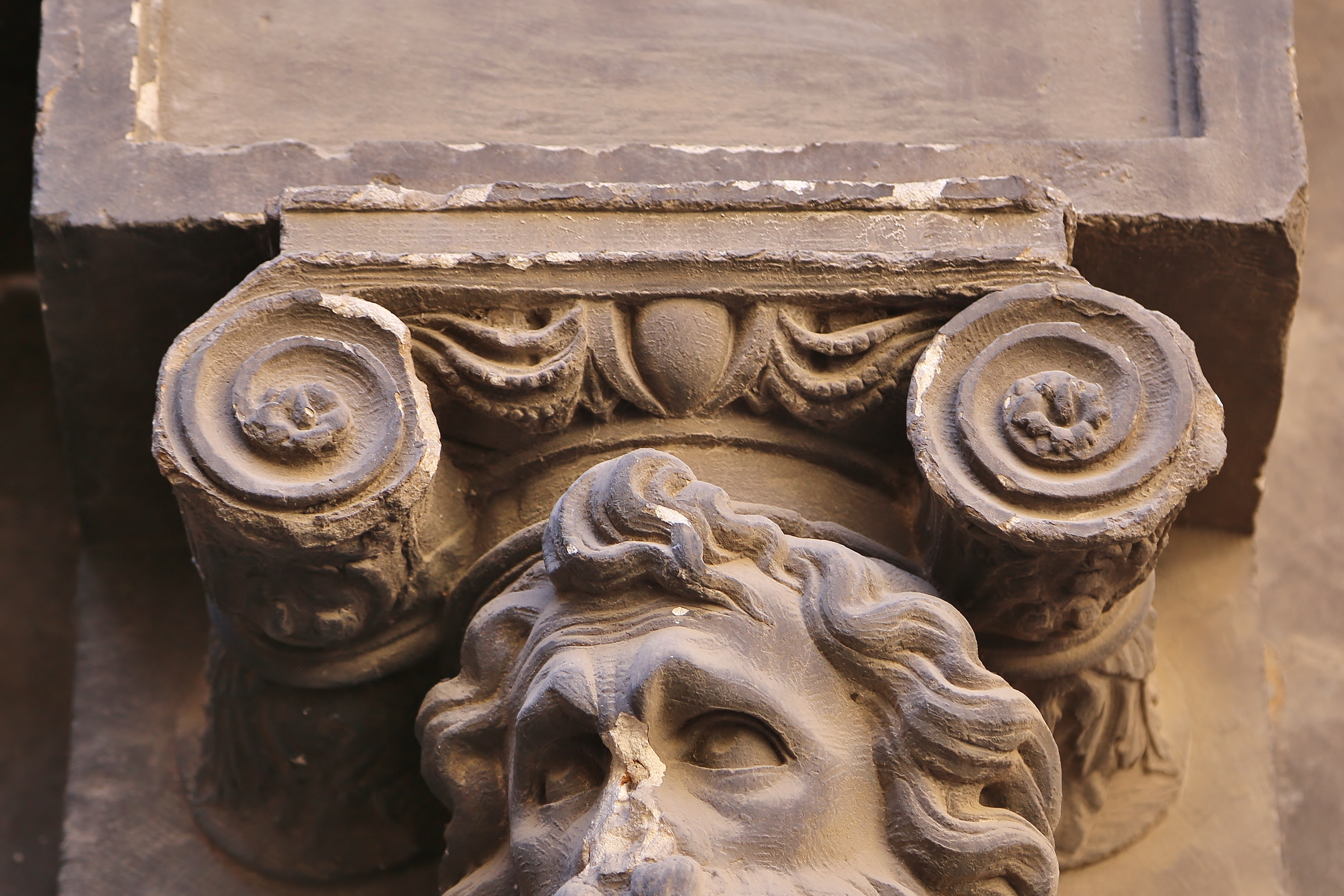
Ionic capital of the telamon door of the Hôtel de Bagis.

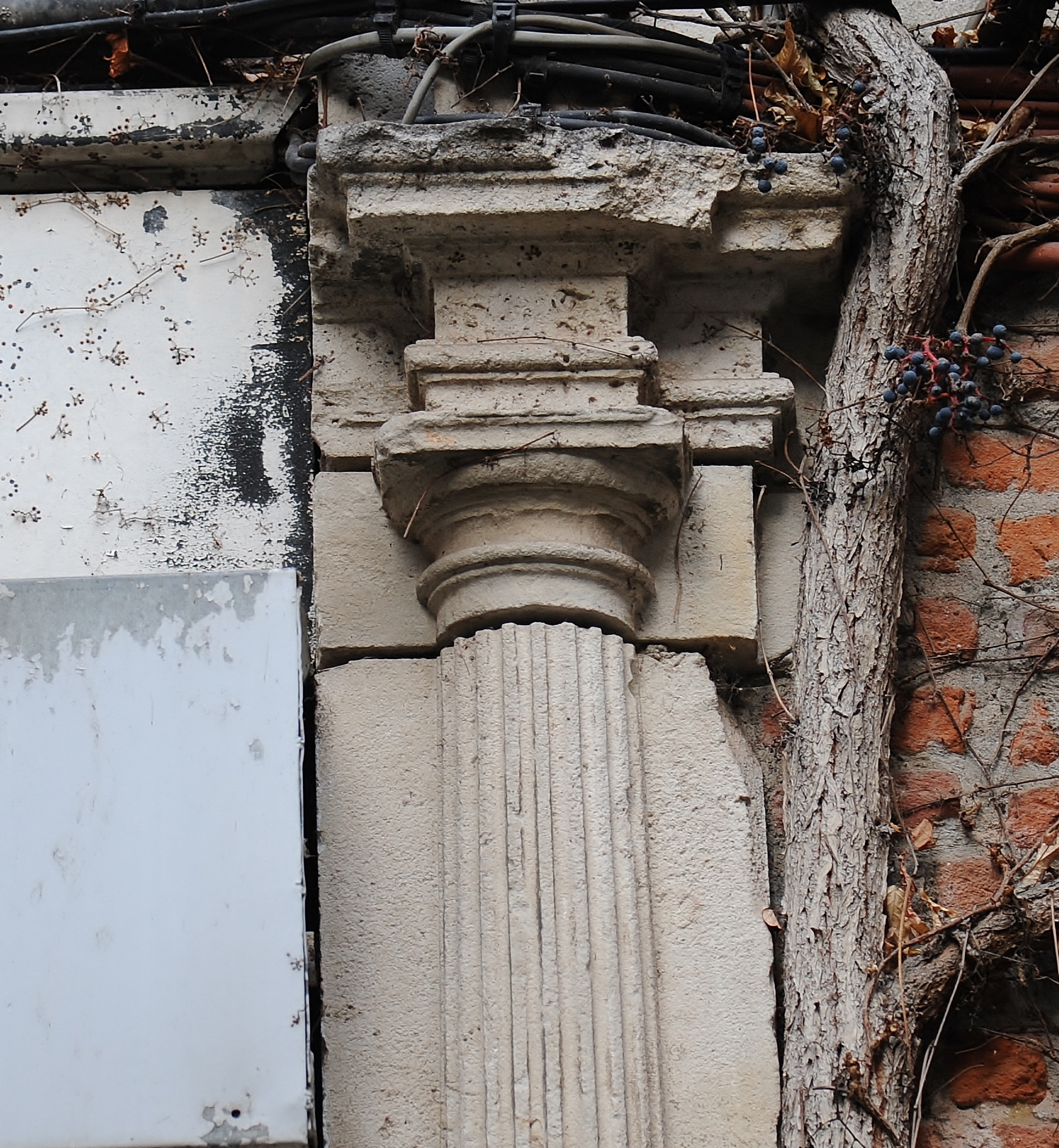
Doric capital at the Hôtel Guillaume de Bernuy (aka Hôtel de Buet).

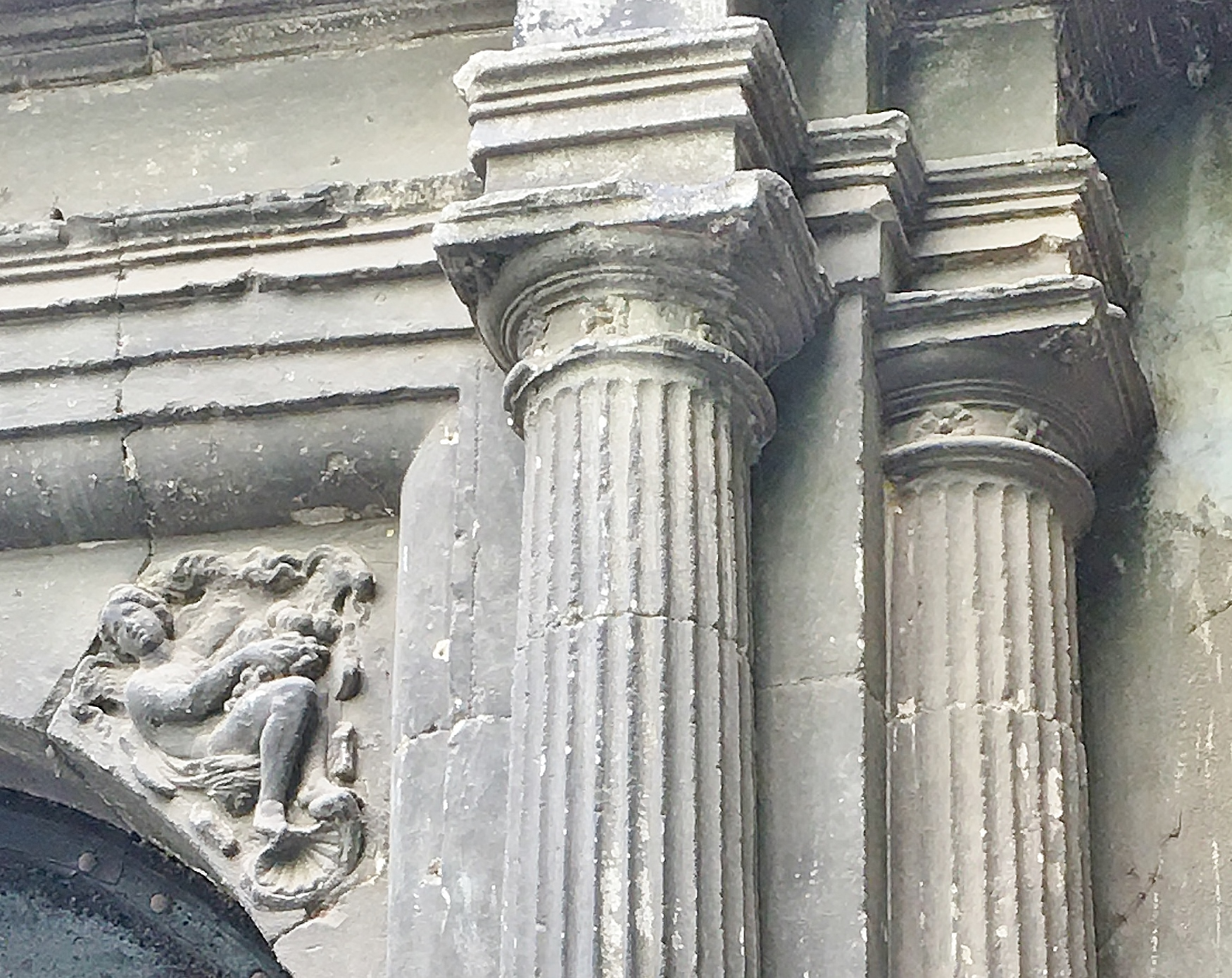
Doric capitals at the Hôtel Guillaume de Bernuy.

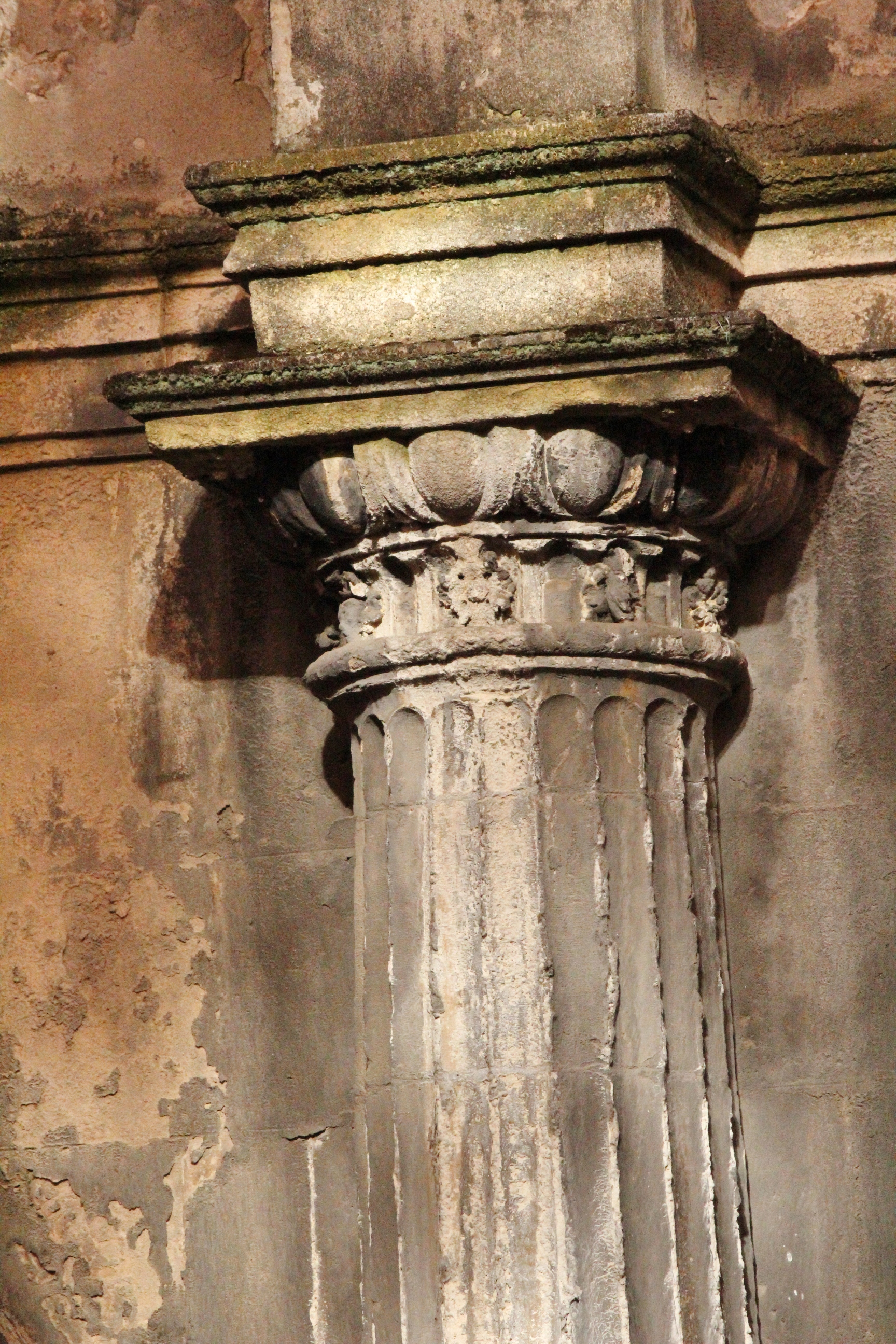
Doric capital at the Hôtel du Vieux-Raisin.

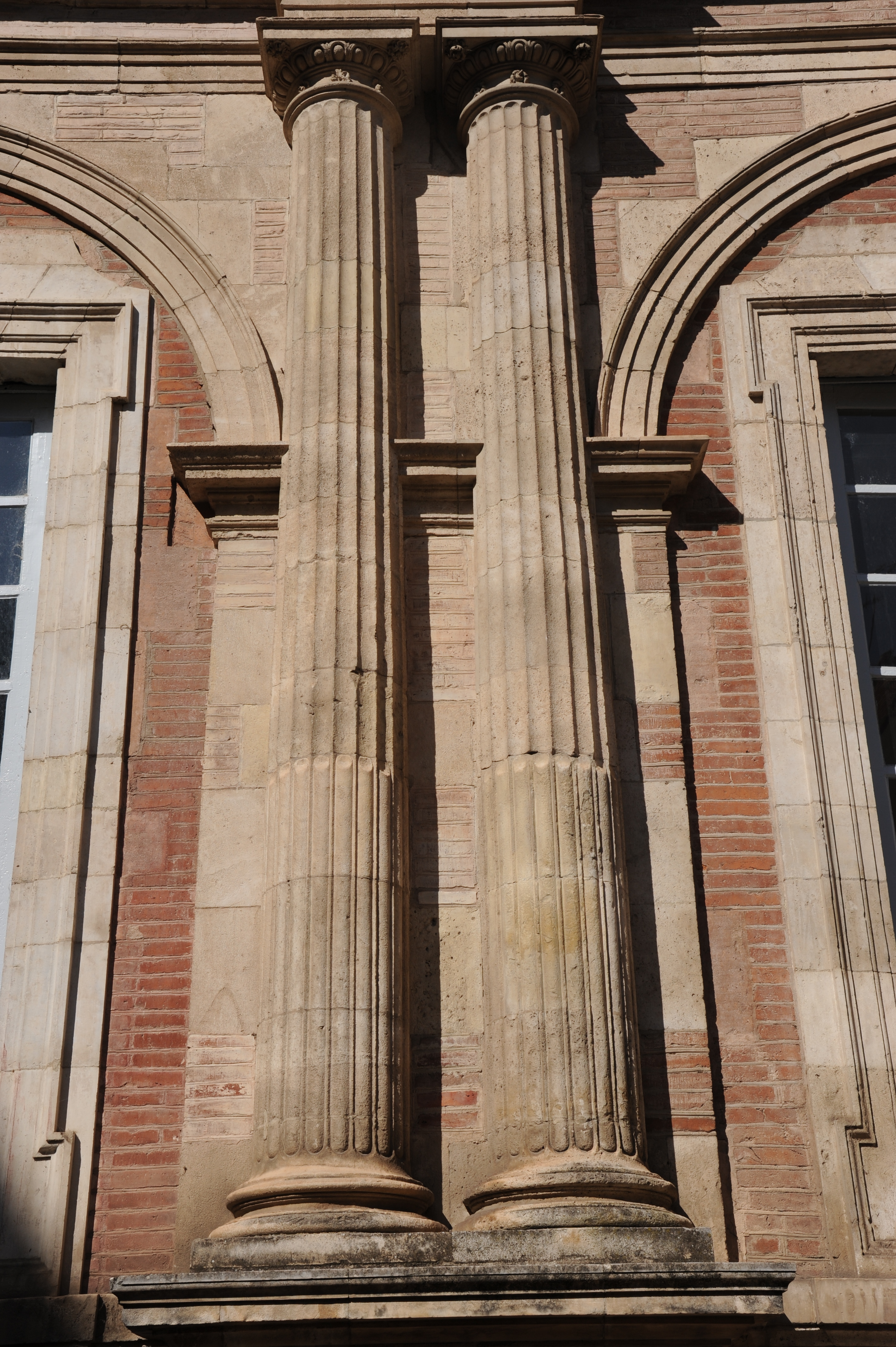
Fluted and filleted columns at the Hôtel d'Assézat.

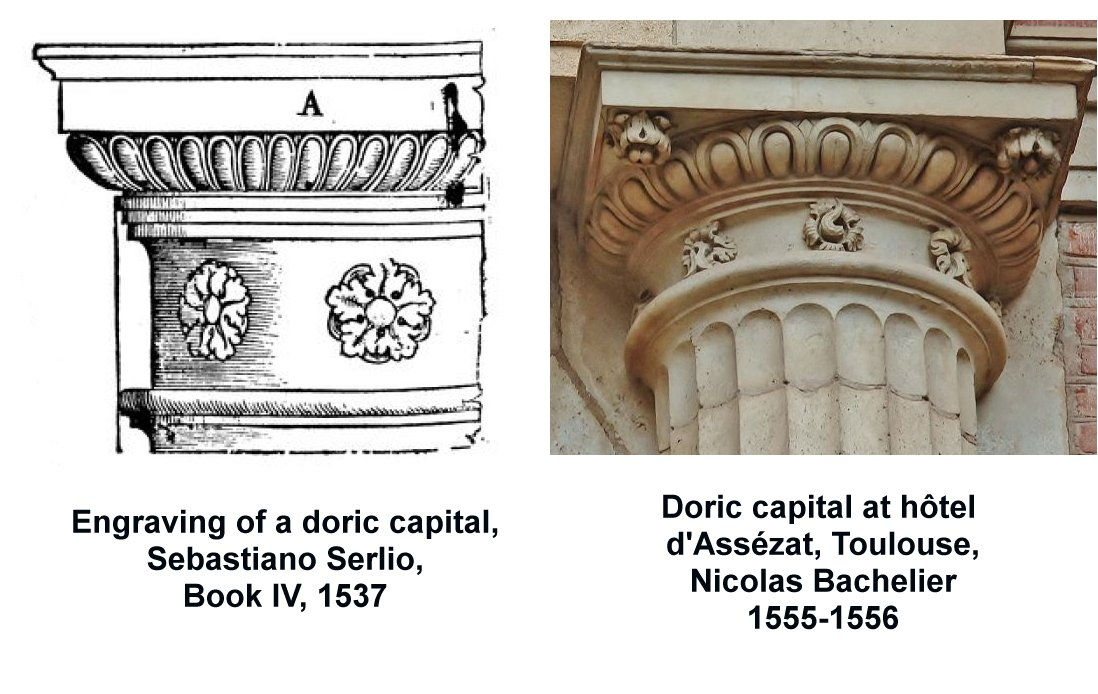
Influence of Serlio's engravings.

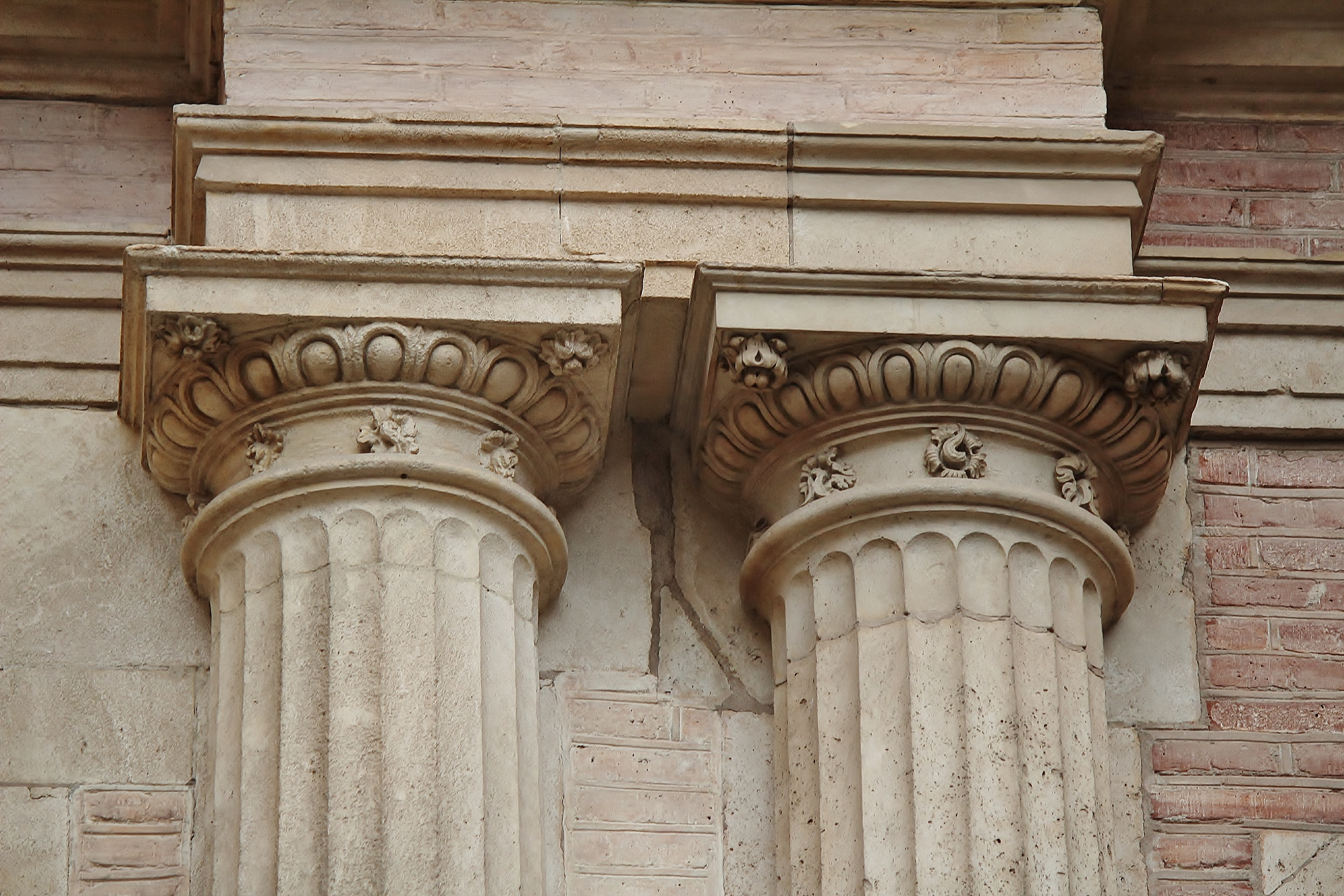
Doric capitals at the Hôtel d'Assézat.

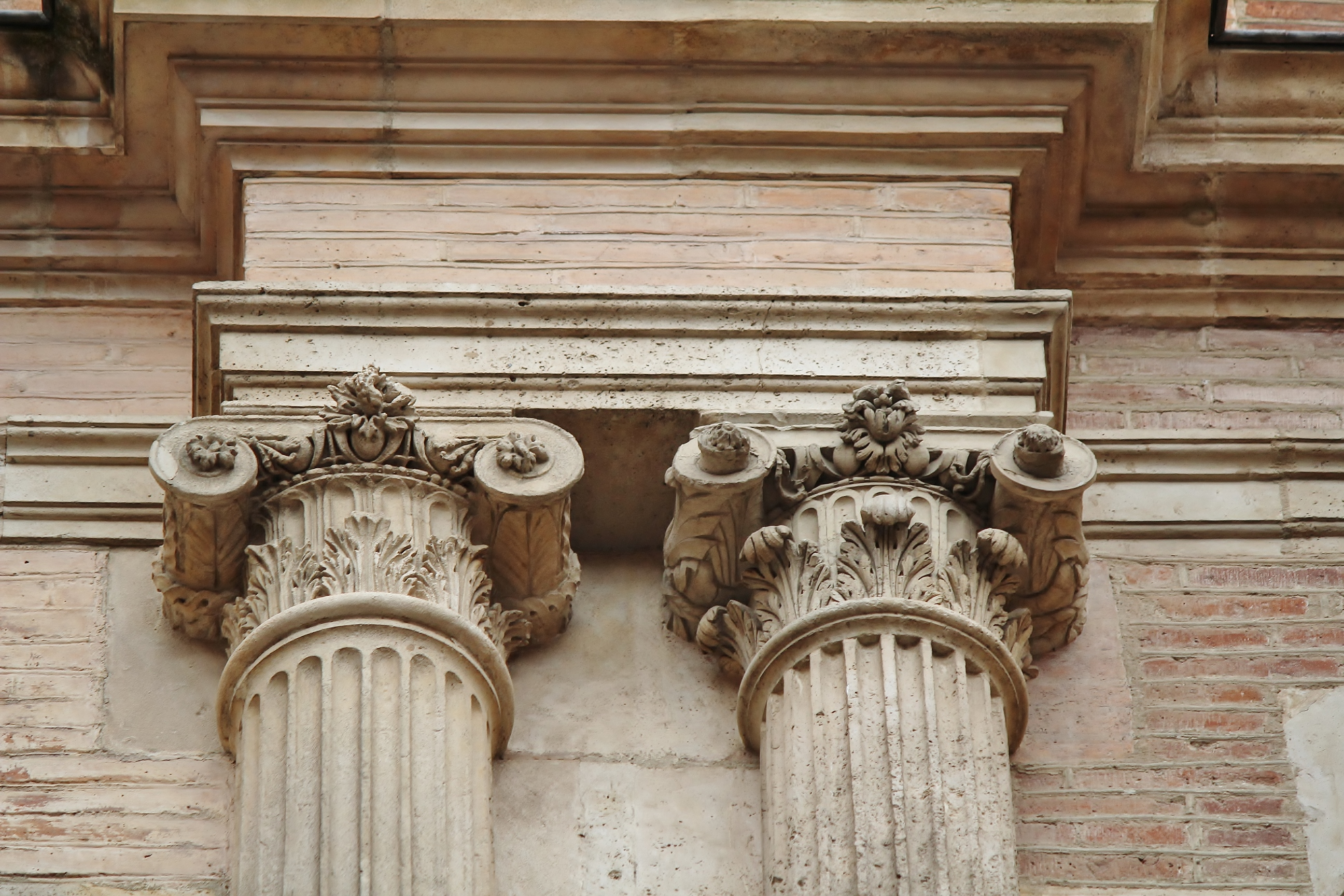
Ionic capitals at the Hôtel d'Assézat.

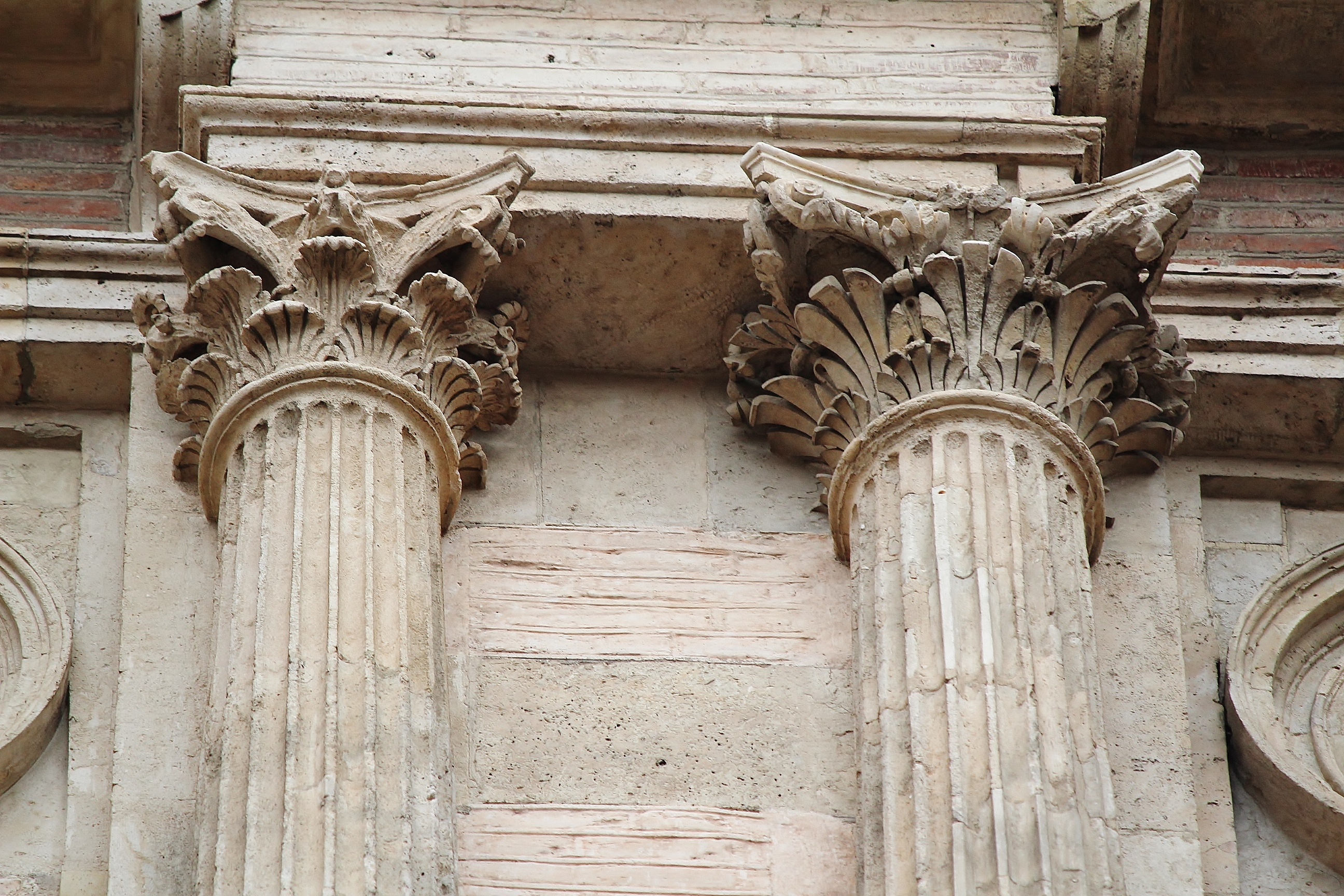
Corinthian capitals at the Hôtel d'Assézat.

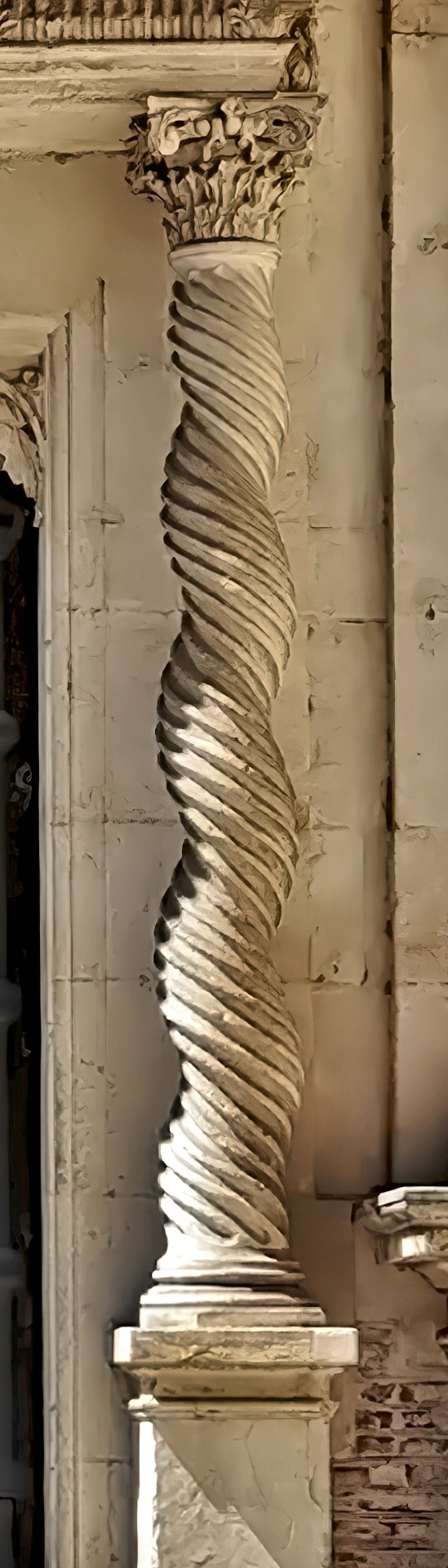
Solomonic column with composite capital at the Hôtel d'Assézat.

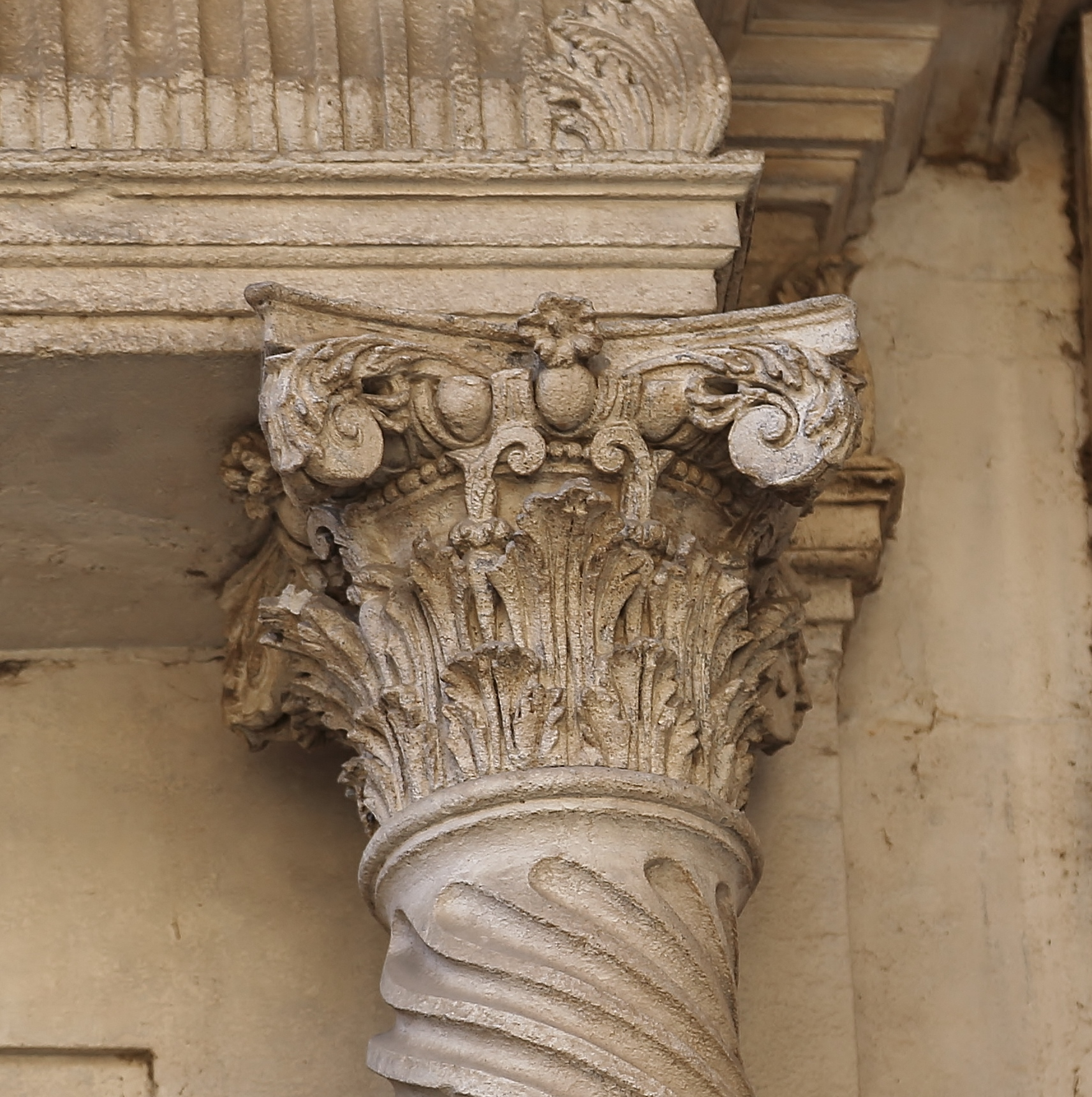
Composite capital from the previous photo.

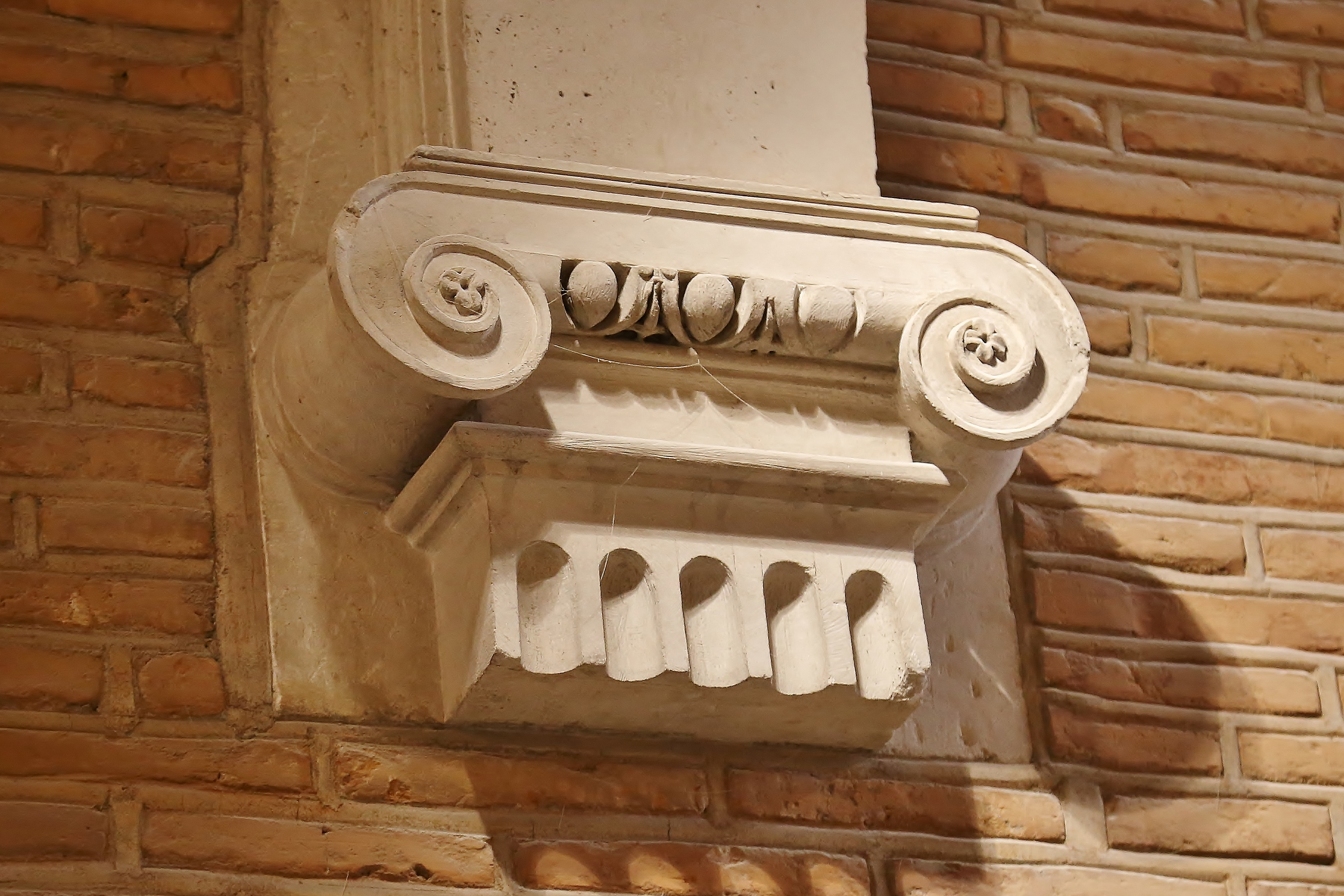
Ionic capital in the staircase of the Hôtel d'Assézat.

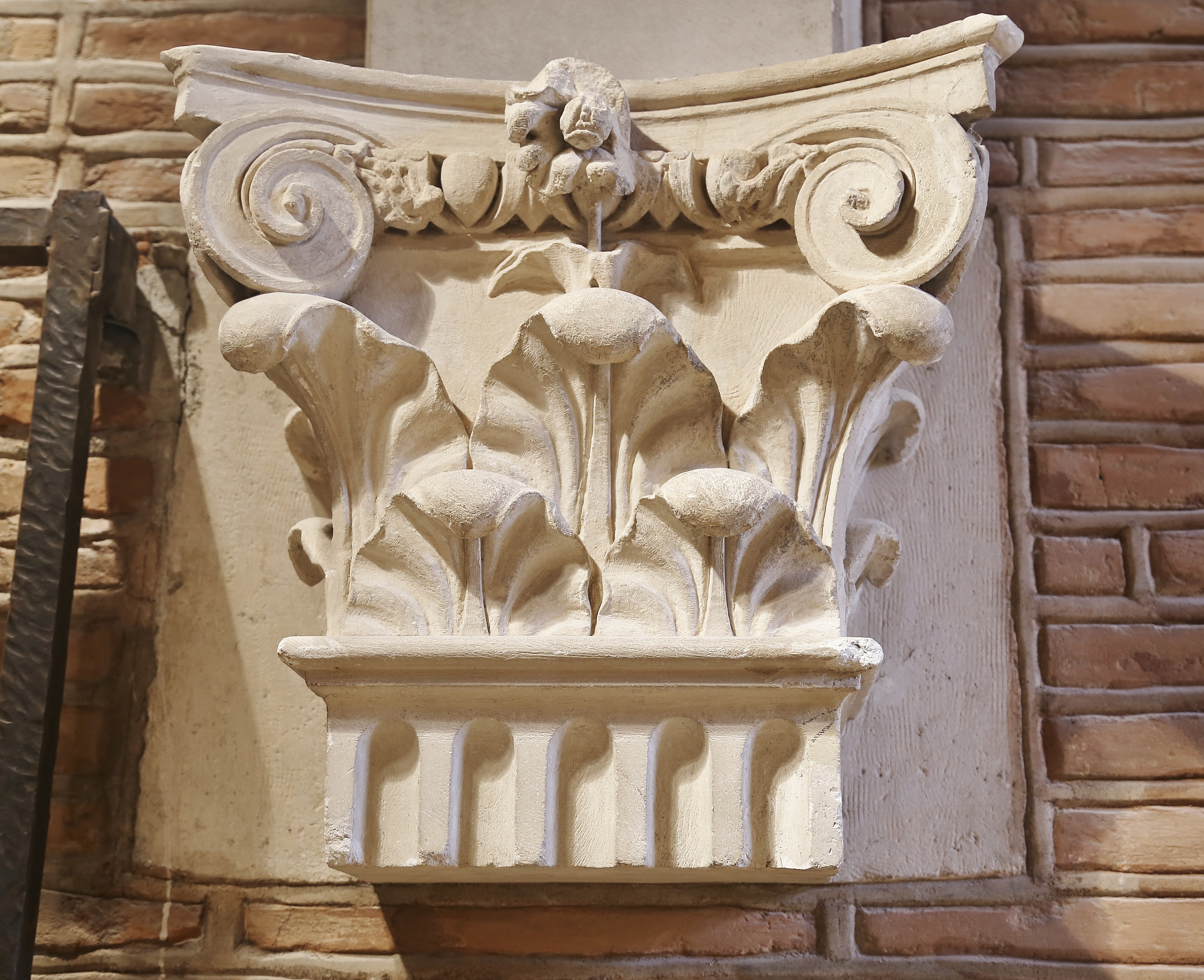
Composite capital in the staircase of the Hôtel d'Assézat.

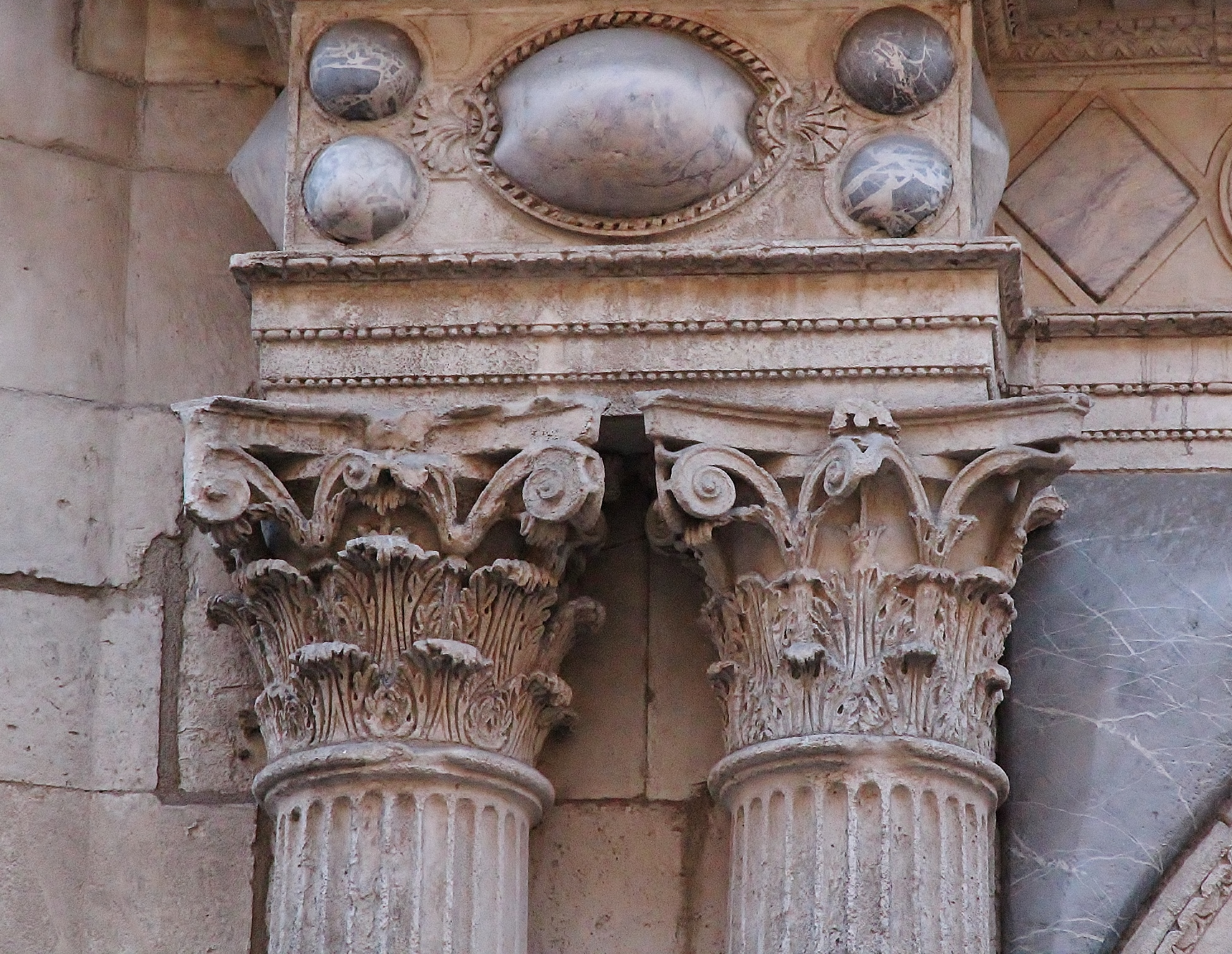
Corinthian capitals at the Hôtel Molinier.

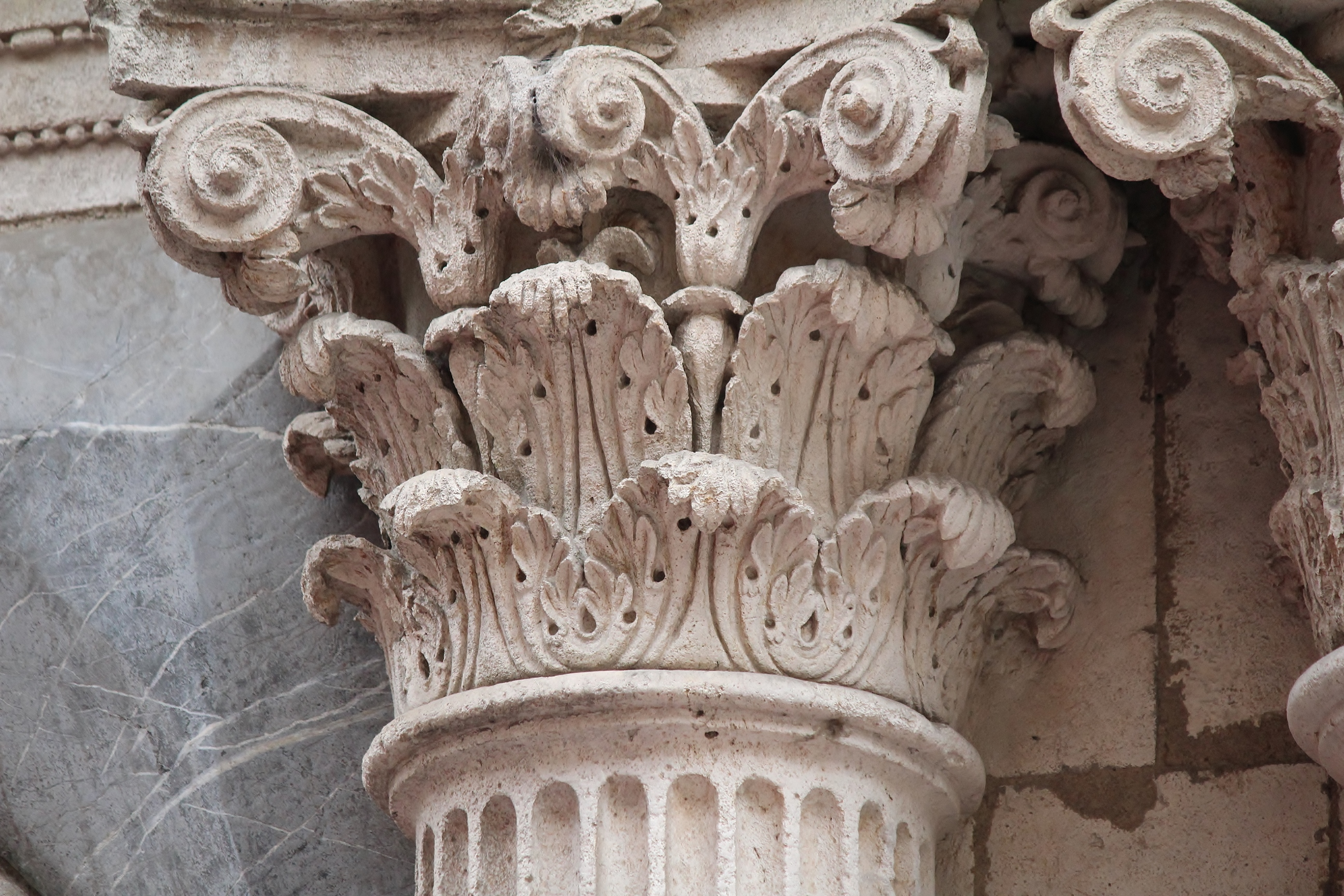
Laurel leaves at the Hotel Molinier.

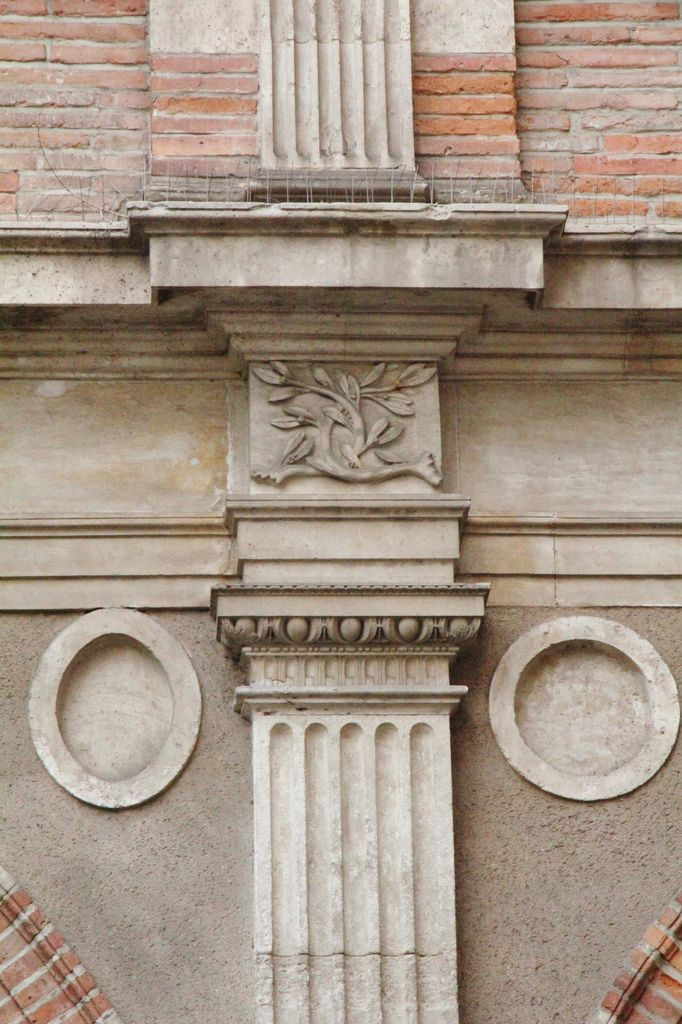
Doric capital at the Hôtel Potier-Laterrasse.

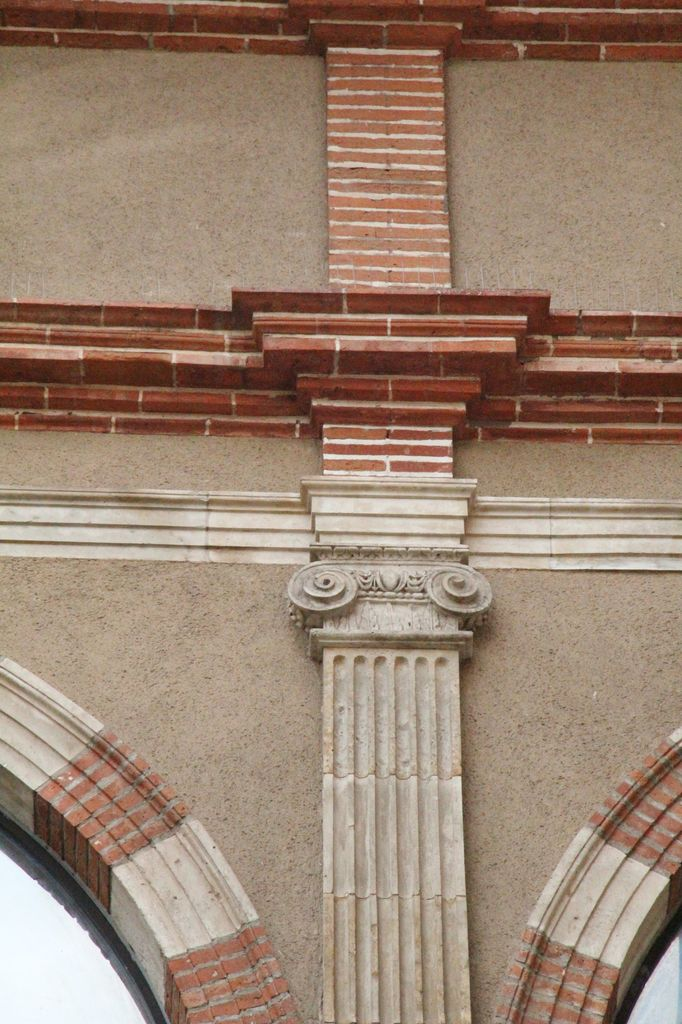
Ionic capital at the Hôtel Potier-Laterrasse.

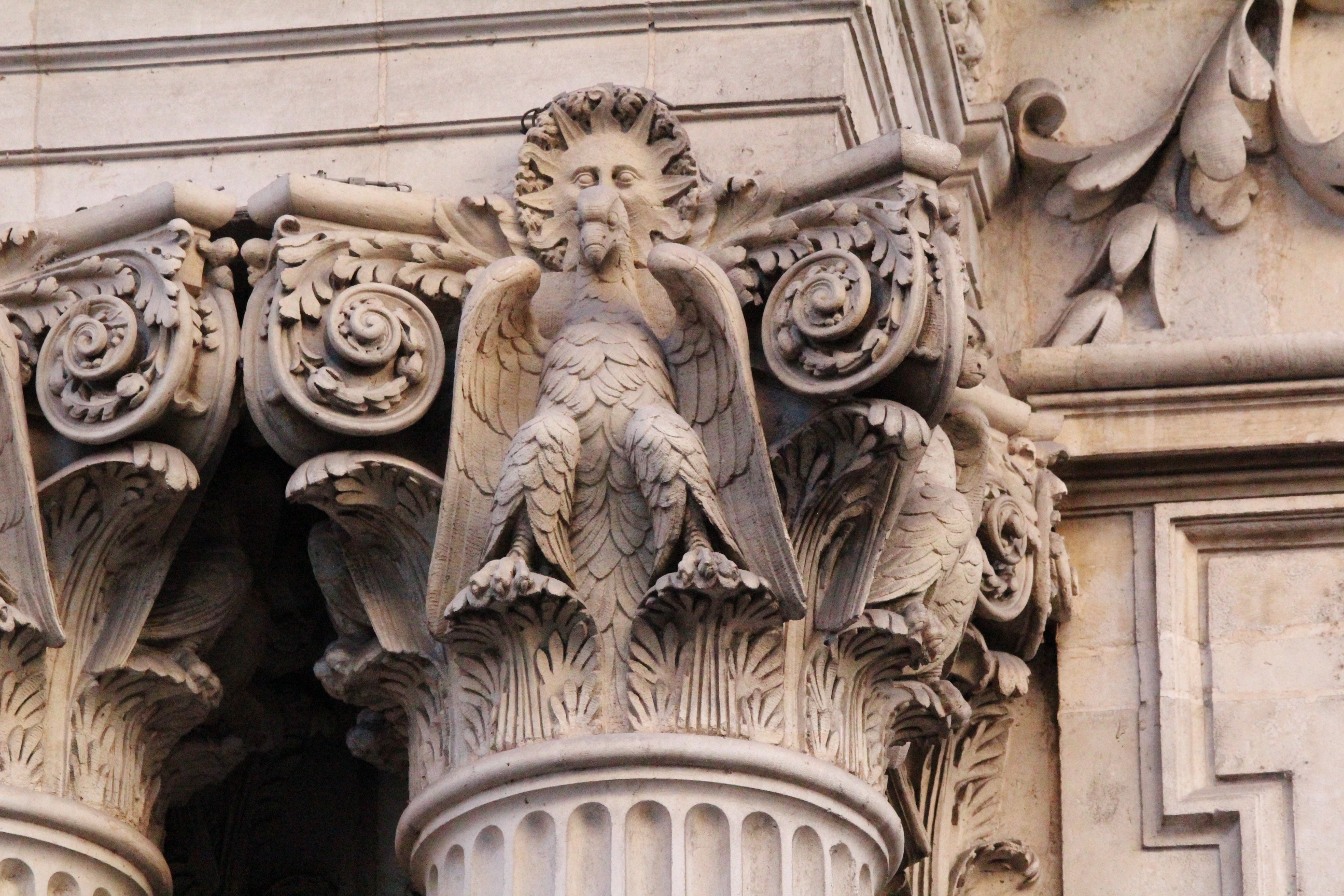
The Clary's eagle mingles with laurel leaves on this composite capital of the Hôtel de Clary (aka stone hotel).

=== The Caryatid order ===
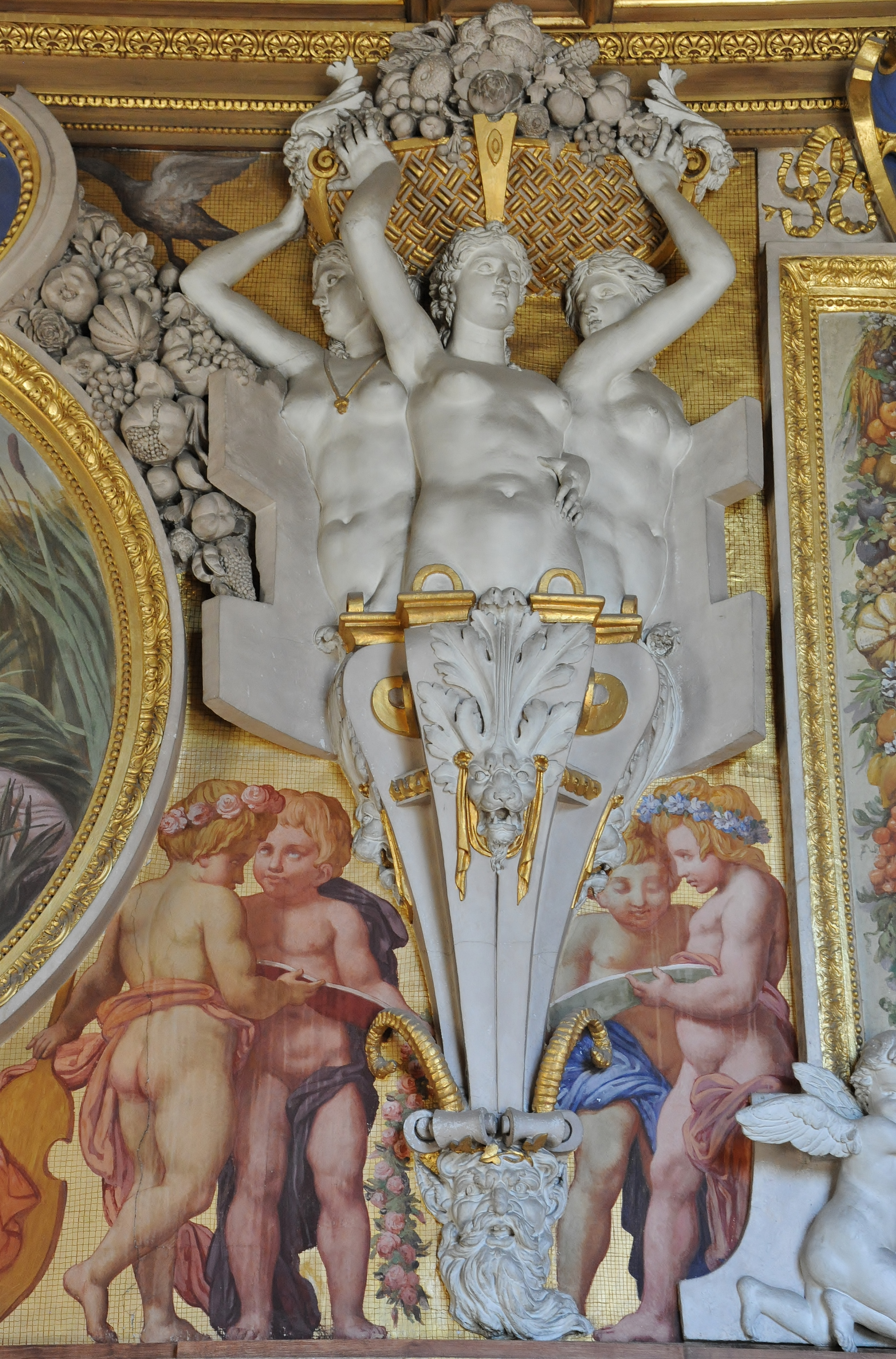
Château de Fontainebleau : some of Toulouse's creations are similar to stucco models from the 1530s made by artists on royal palaces (here decorating the Francis I gallery).

After 1540, Renaissance door and window frames were often the expression of the Caryatid order, an evolution of the classical style. These anthropomorphic supports, in terms (armless and sheathed) or in the form of telamons and caryatids (carrying a load or an entablature with their arms, often also sheathed), were spectacularly realised in Toulouse. Inspired by the stuccoes of the royal castles of Madrid and Fontainebleau and by architectural treatises such as those of Philibert Delorme, Jacques Androuet du Cerceau and Marcantonio Raimondi, they were used for several decades.

The sculptors of Toulouse adopted conventions that made it difficult to attribute authorship of the works: hairstyles and faces of Venus for women, beard and frowning eyebrows for men. These works are inspired by Michelangelo's terribilità but also by a literary and erudite knowledge of the chryselephantine Zeus of Olympia to which the sculptor Phidias had given tenebrous eyebrows taken from the verses of Homer. For this reason, many of these works were later attributed to the architect and sculptor Nicolas Bachelier, who, according to legend (certainly unfounded), was a pupil of the great Michelangelo. These uncertain attributions have posed and continue to pose difficulties in dating the works. Thus Historians are still debating the age of the most emblematic portal of this type: that of the courtyard of the Hôtel de Bagis (or Hôtel de Pierre) with the famous old telamons. Dated to 1538 and attributed to Nicolas Bachelier for some, to the beginning of the 17th century and the workshop of Pierre Souffron for others, a more recent publication now mentions the decade 1550 and a resemblance with engravings of the fireplaces of the Château de Madrid (destroyed). The same doubt hangs over the spectacular windows of the Hôtel du Vieux-Raisin: do they date from the owner Jean Burnet (from 1547), clerk at the Parlement of Toulouse, or from the Bishop of Lombez Pierre de Lancrau, which would rather date them from 1580 to 1584?

This interest of the Toulouse Renaissance for telamons and caryatids takes its full magnitude on the windows of the Hôtel du Vieux-Raisin (2nd and 3rd building campaigns). Some telamons equipped with cushions to support their load refer to the myth of the Garden of the Hesperides and to the moment when Heracles cunningly asked Atlas to take up his burden (to support the weight of the sky) for a moment, the time for him to find a cushion for his shoulders. Other characters are human for the upper part of the body while the lower part is totally animal, inspired by the stucco decorations in the King's Gallery at the Château de Fontainebleau. Finally, on some of these telamons and caryatids, heads are represented at the crotch: a grimacing mask for the men, a child's head for the women, between fertility and sexual passions.

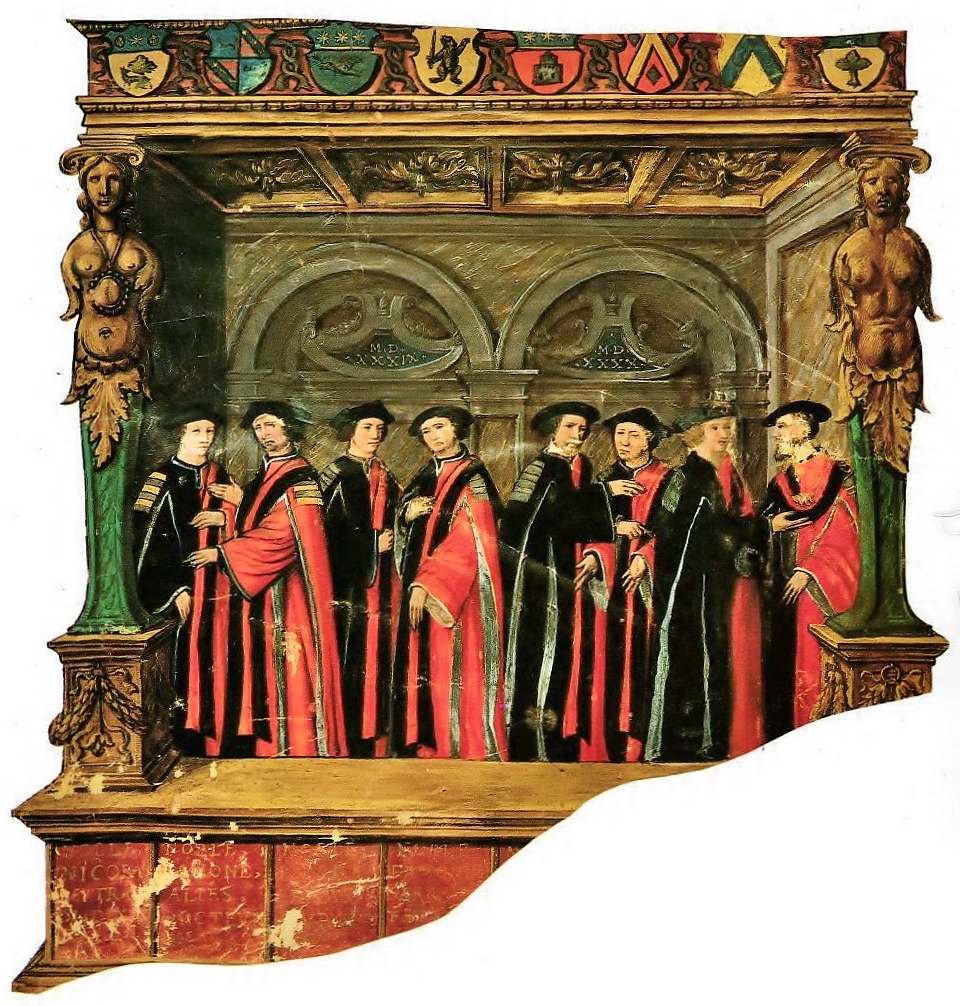
For the first time in Toulouse, two female terms of the Ionic order appear in the illumination of the Handwritten Annals presenting the capitouls of the year 1539-1540.

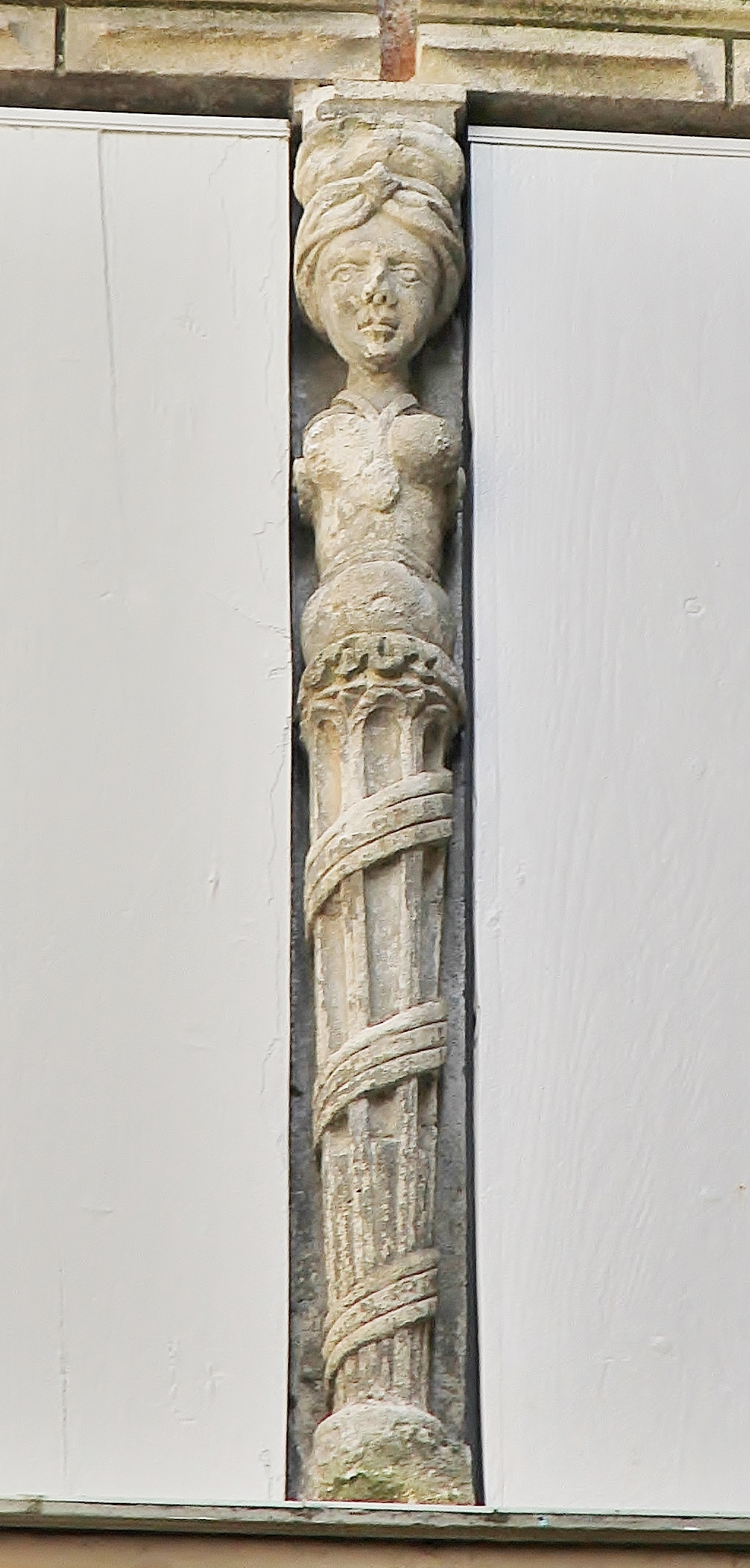
18 rue des Paradoux (courtyard).

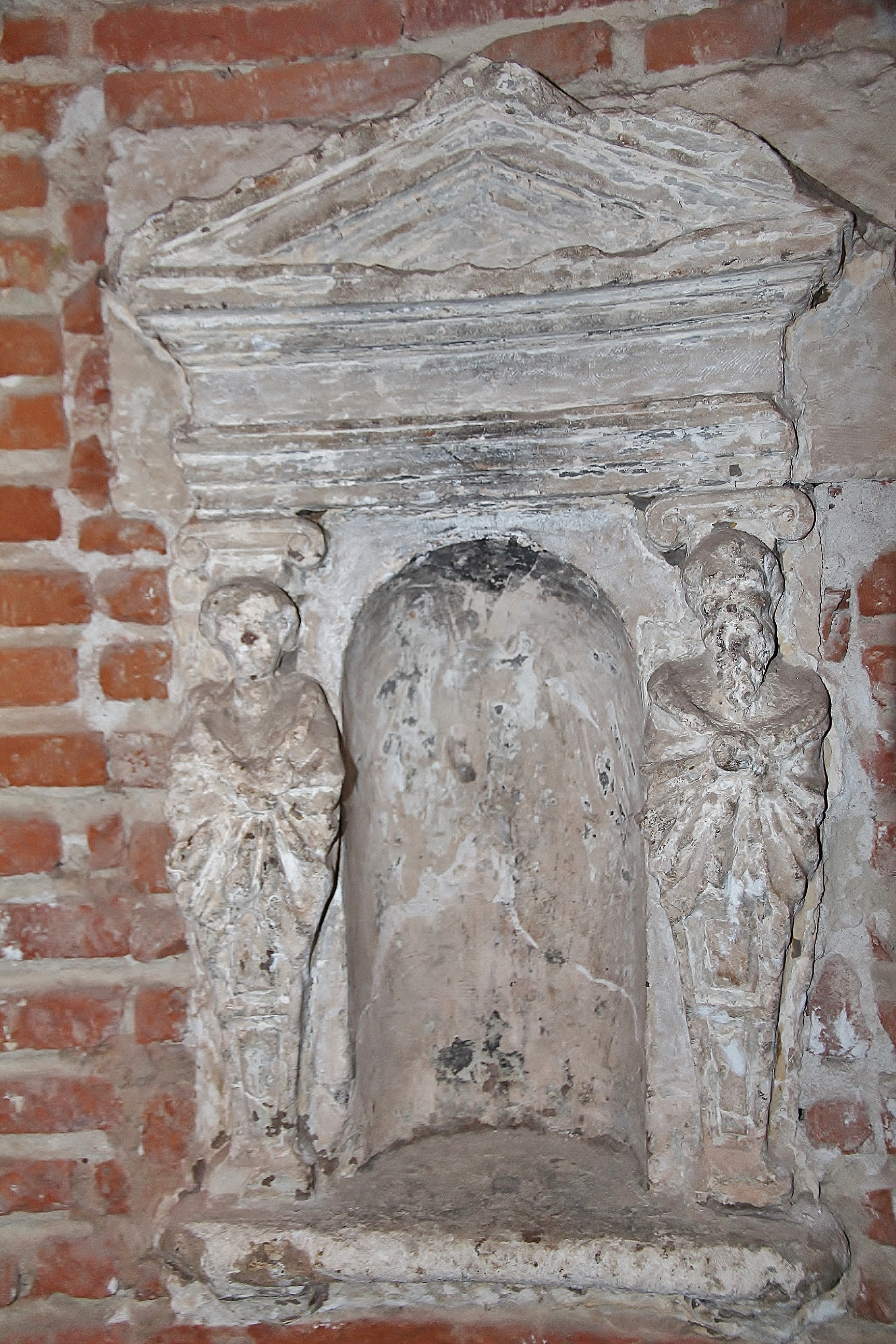
Hôtel de Brucelles: niche decorated with terms dressed in antique style in the staircase of the tower.

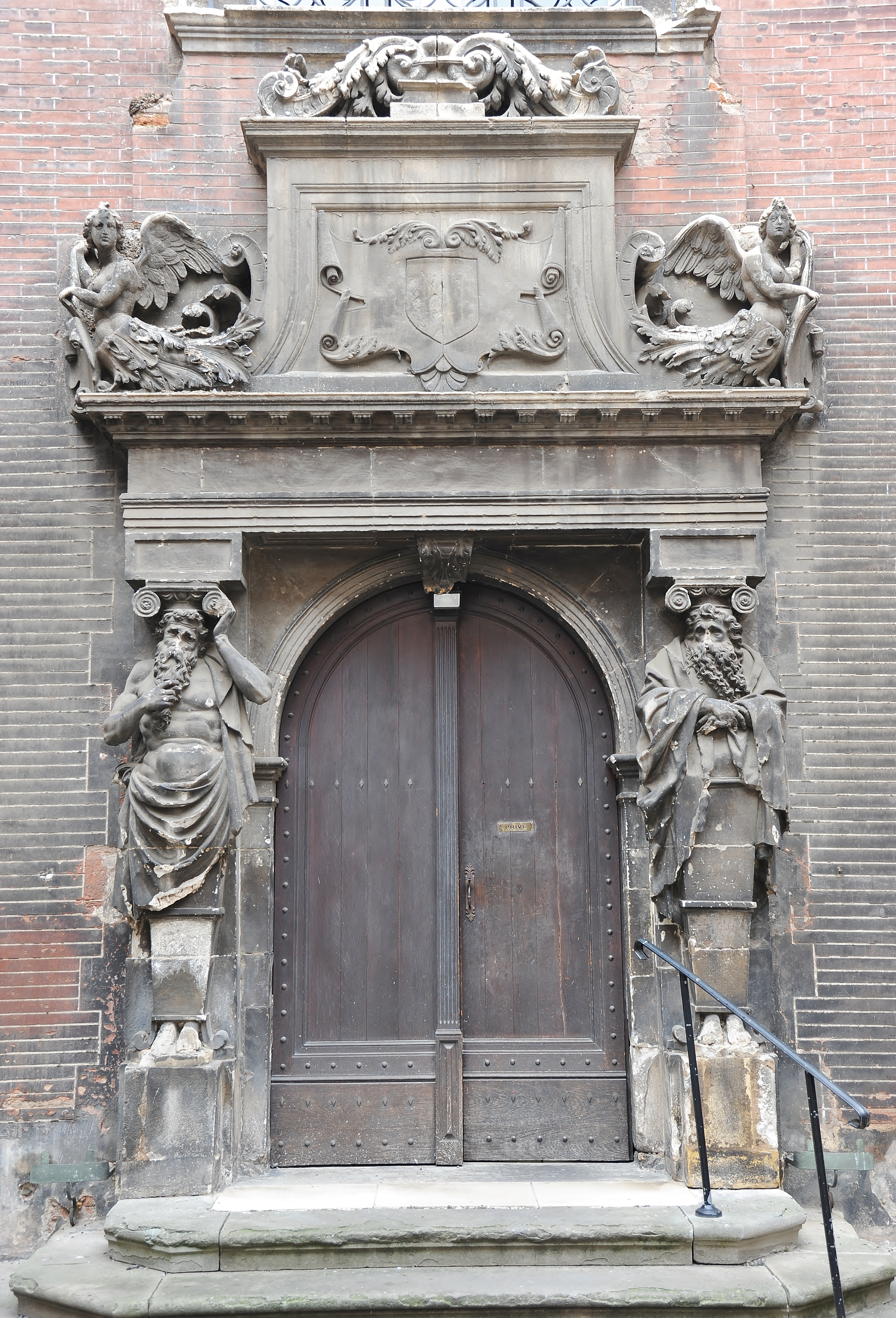
Hôtel de Bagis.

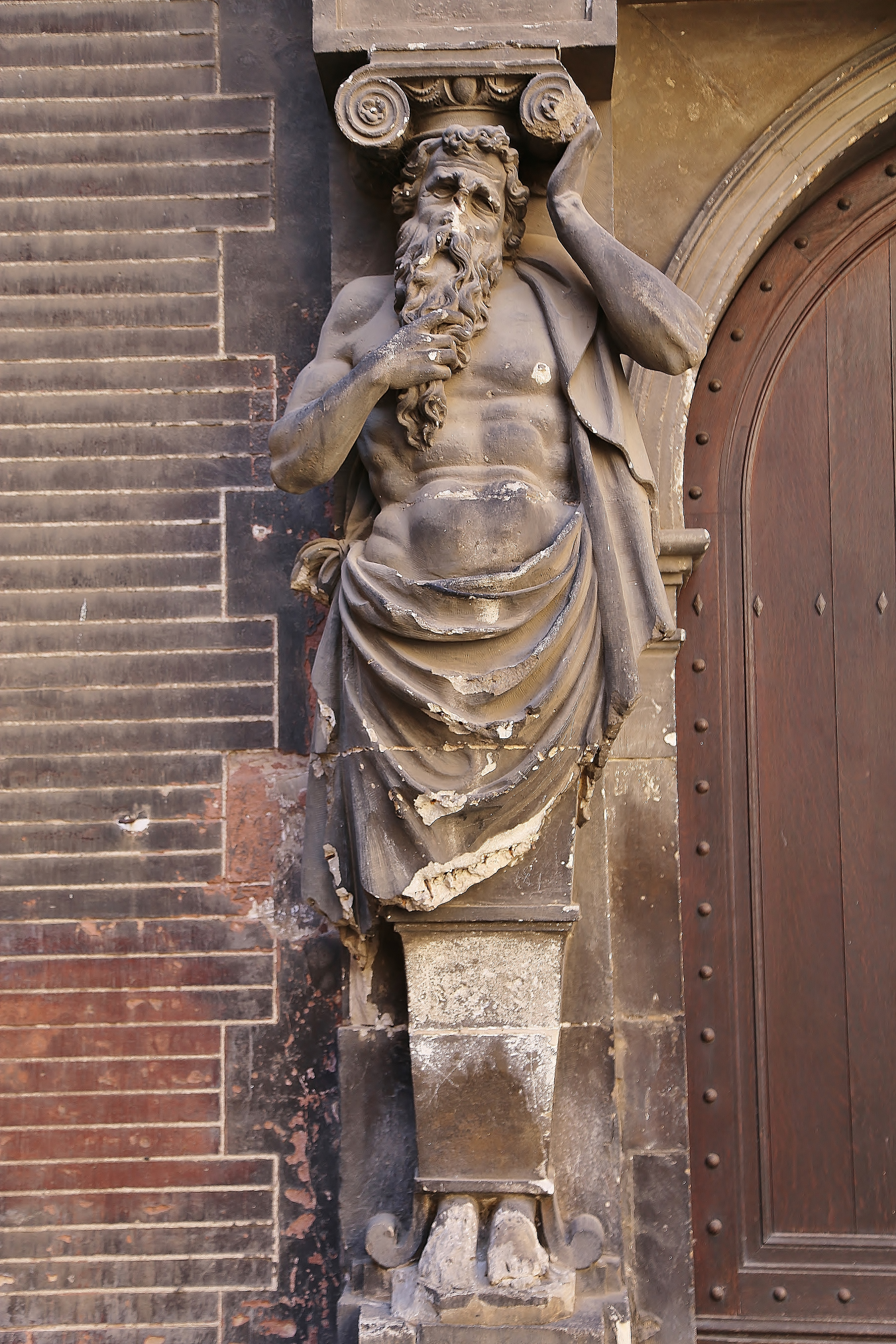
Hôtel de Bagis.

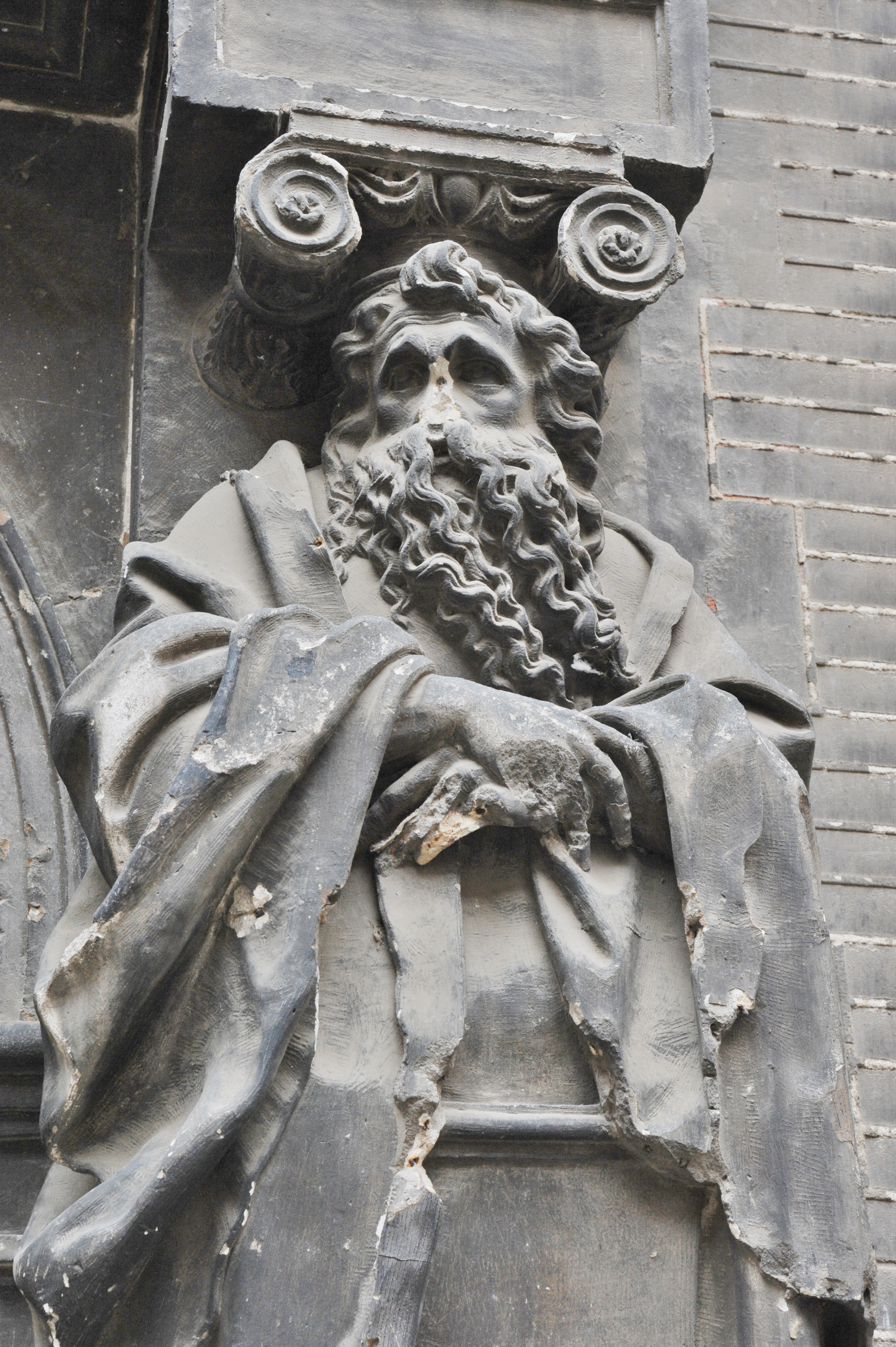
Hôtel de Bagis.

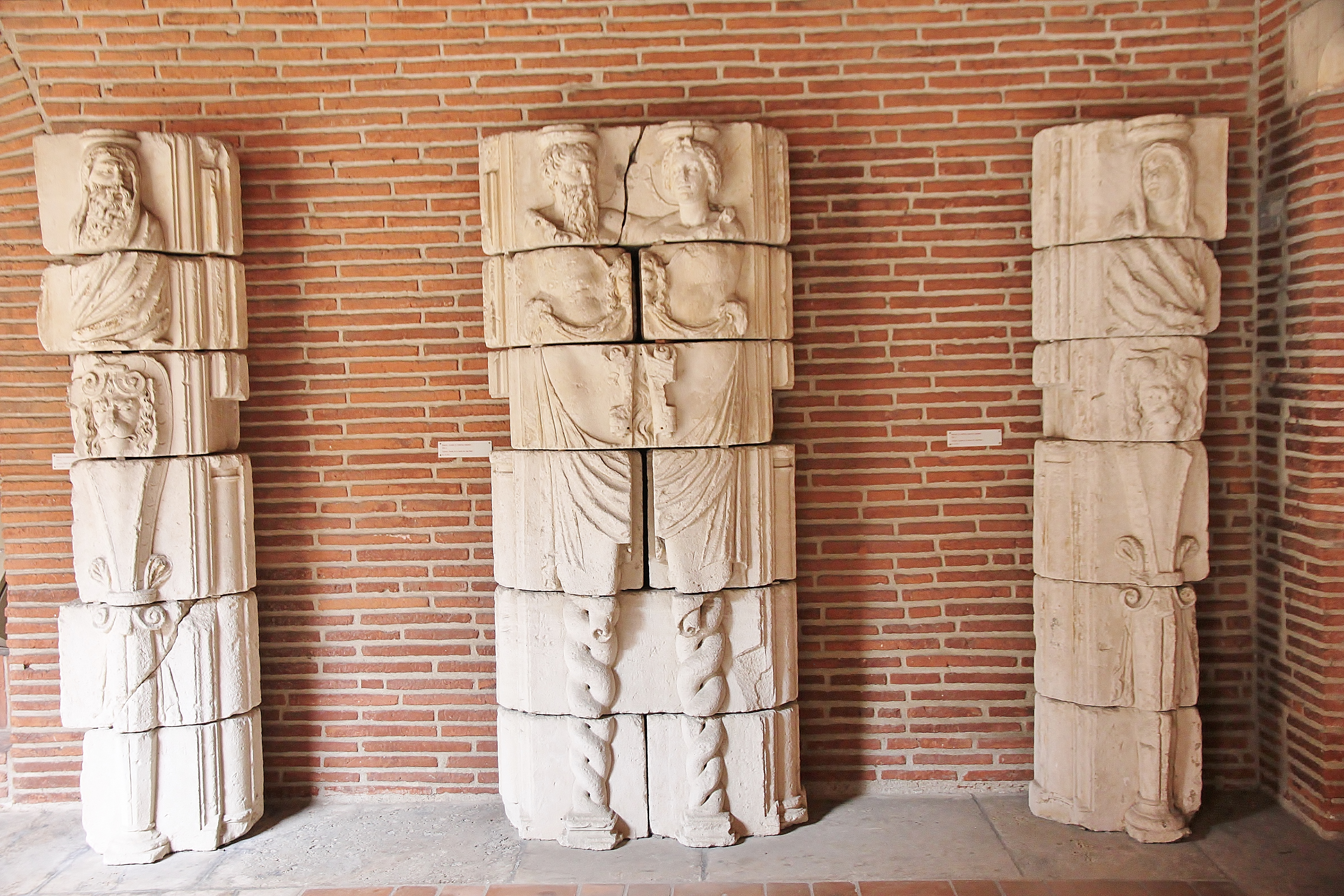
Former Hôtel du Faur de Saint-Jory.

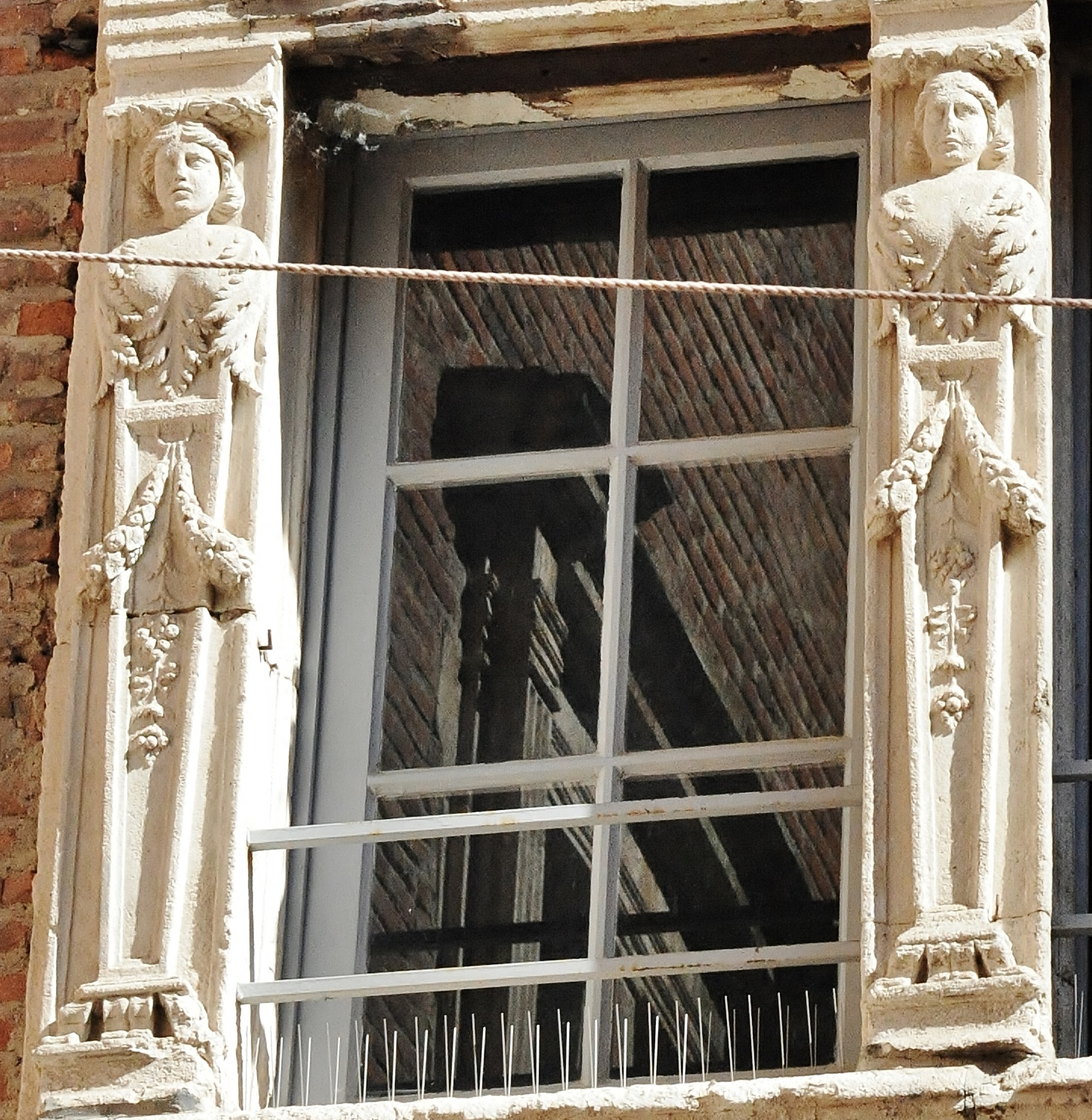
Hôtel Boysson-Cheverry.

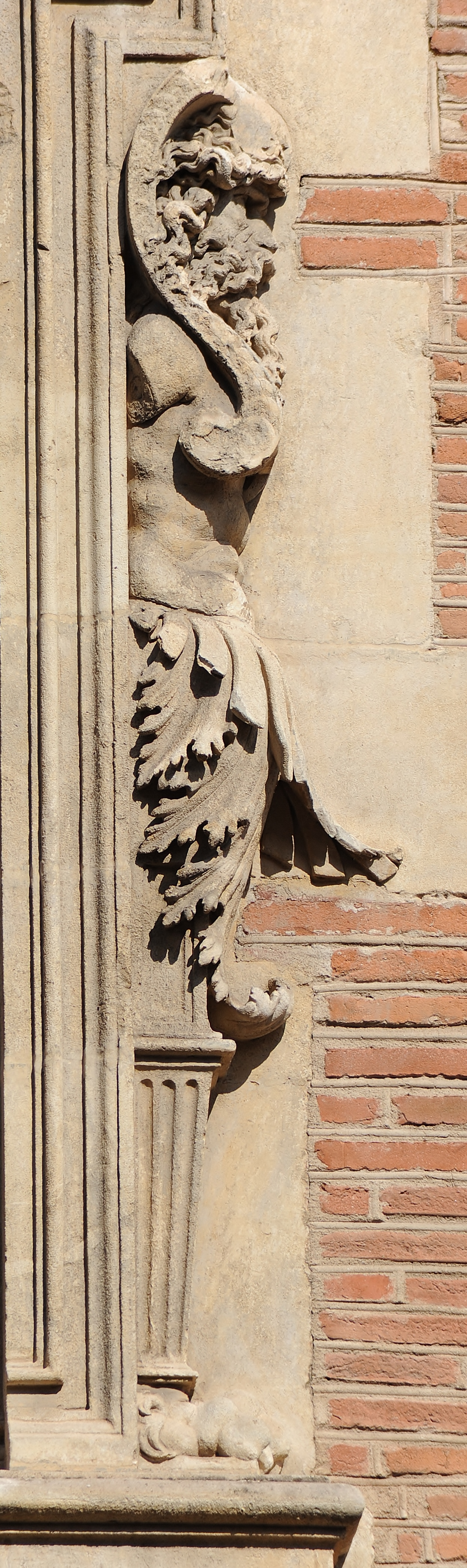
Hôtel du Vieux-Raisin.

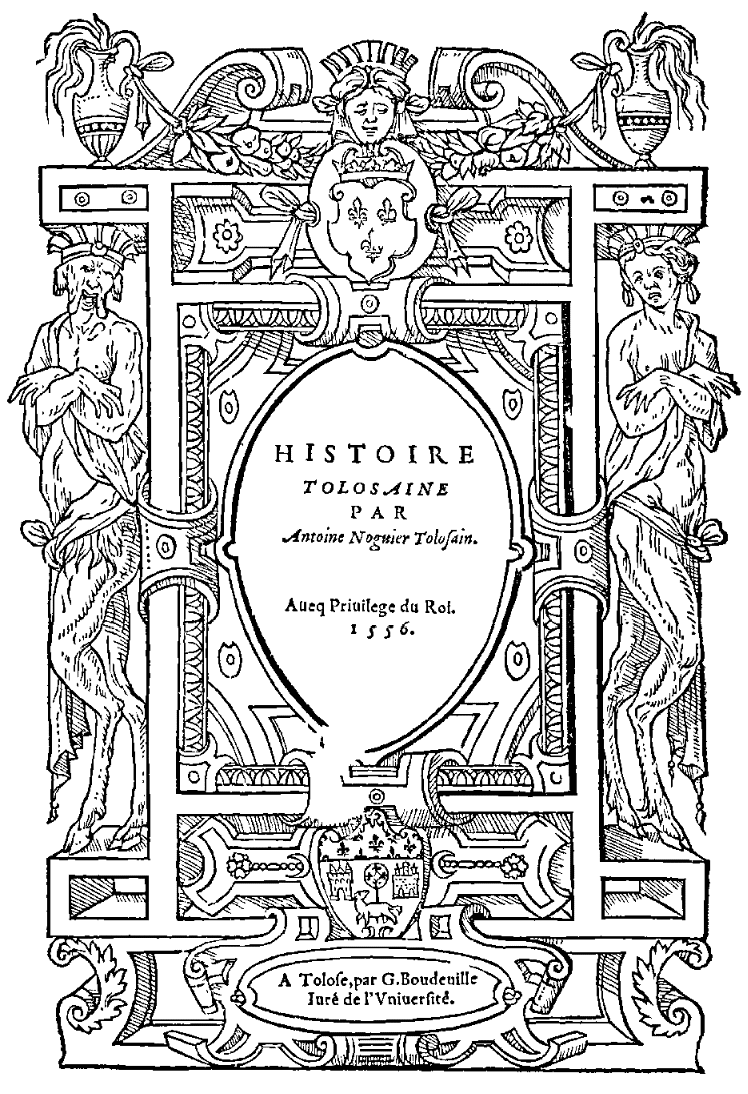
Terms on the title page of the Histoire tolosaine by Antoine Noguier (1556).

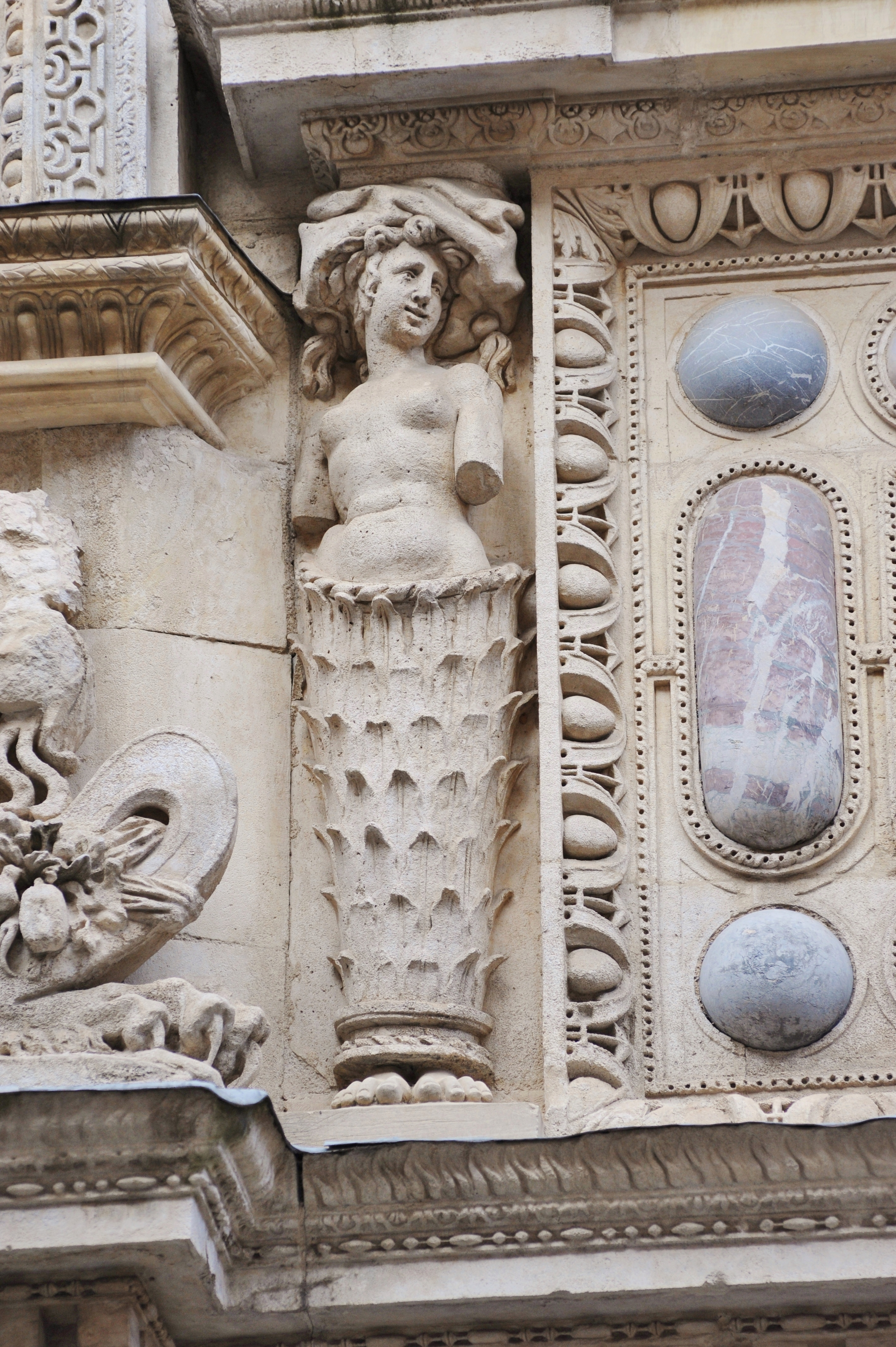
Hôtel Molinier.

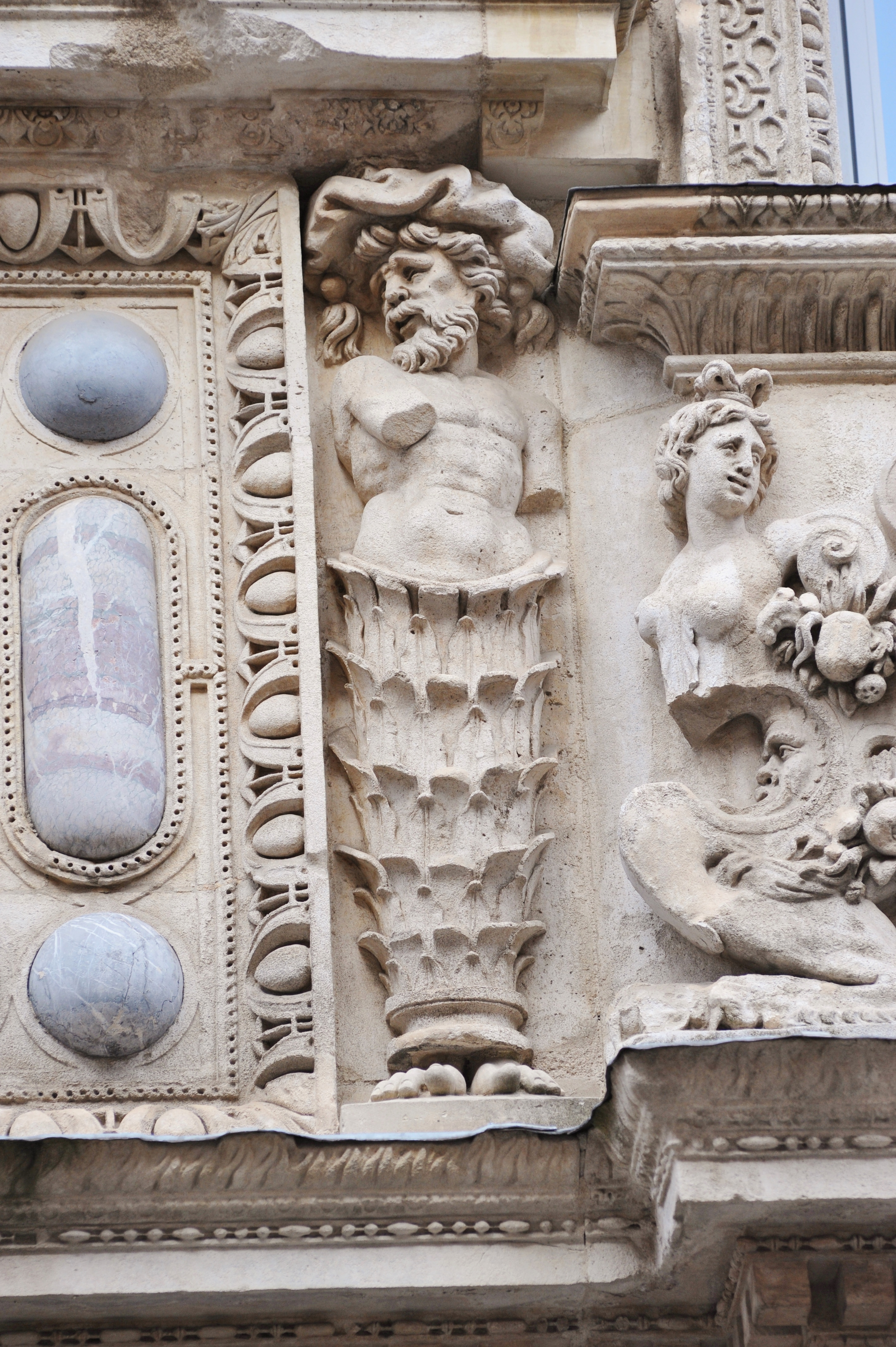
Hôtel Molinier.

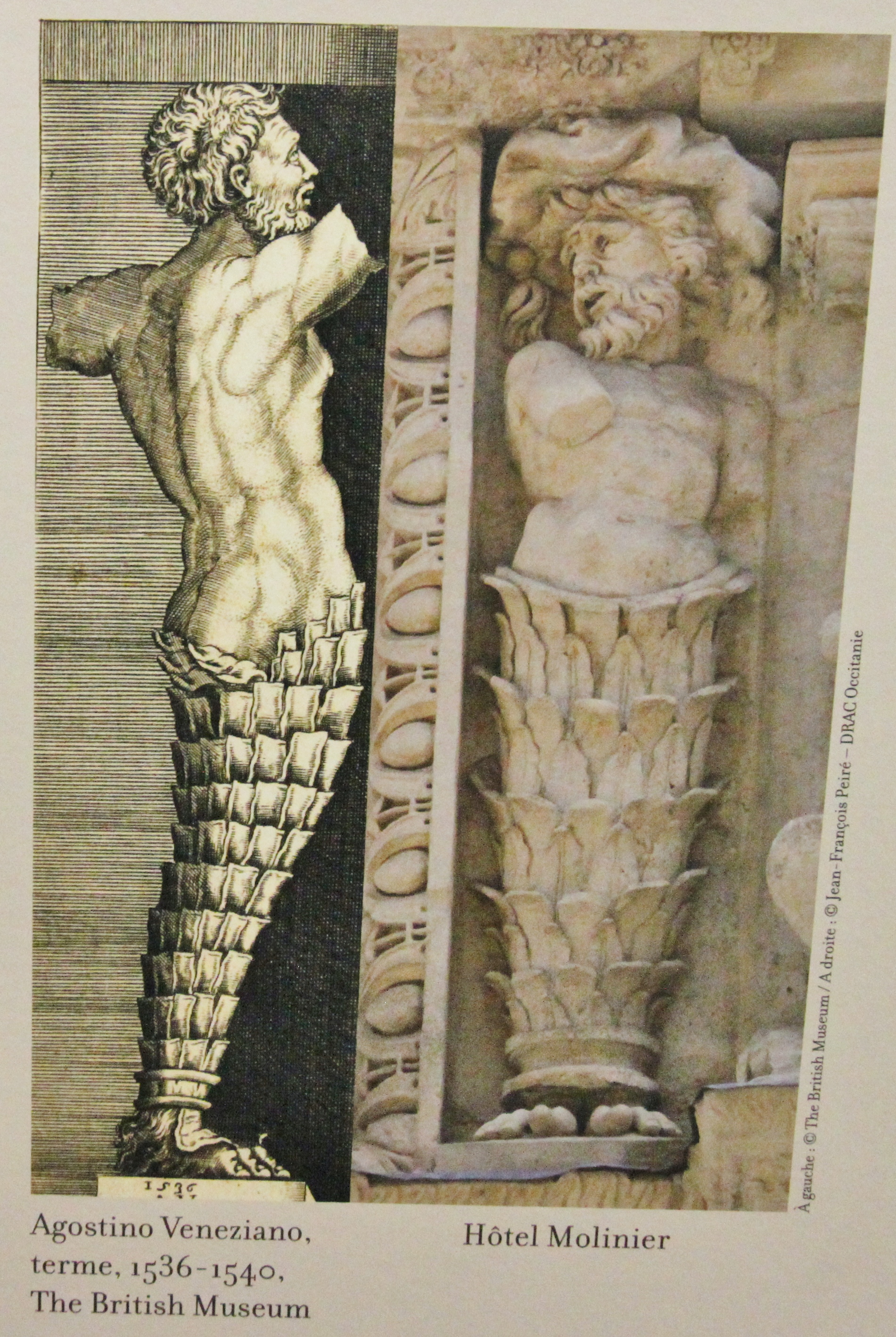
This engraving by Veneziano, a pupil of Raimondi, inspired the terms of the Hôtel Molinier.

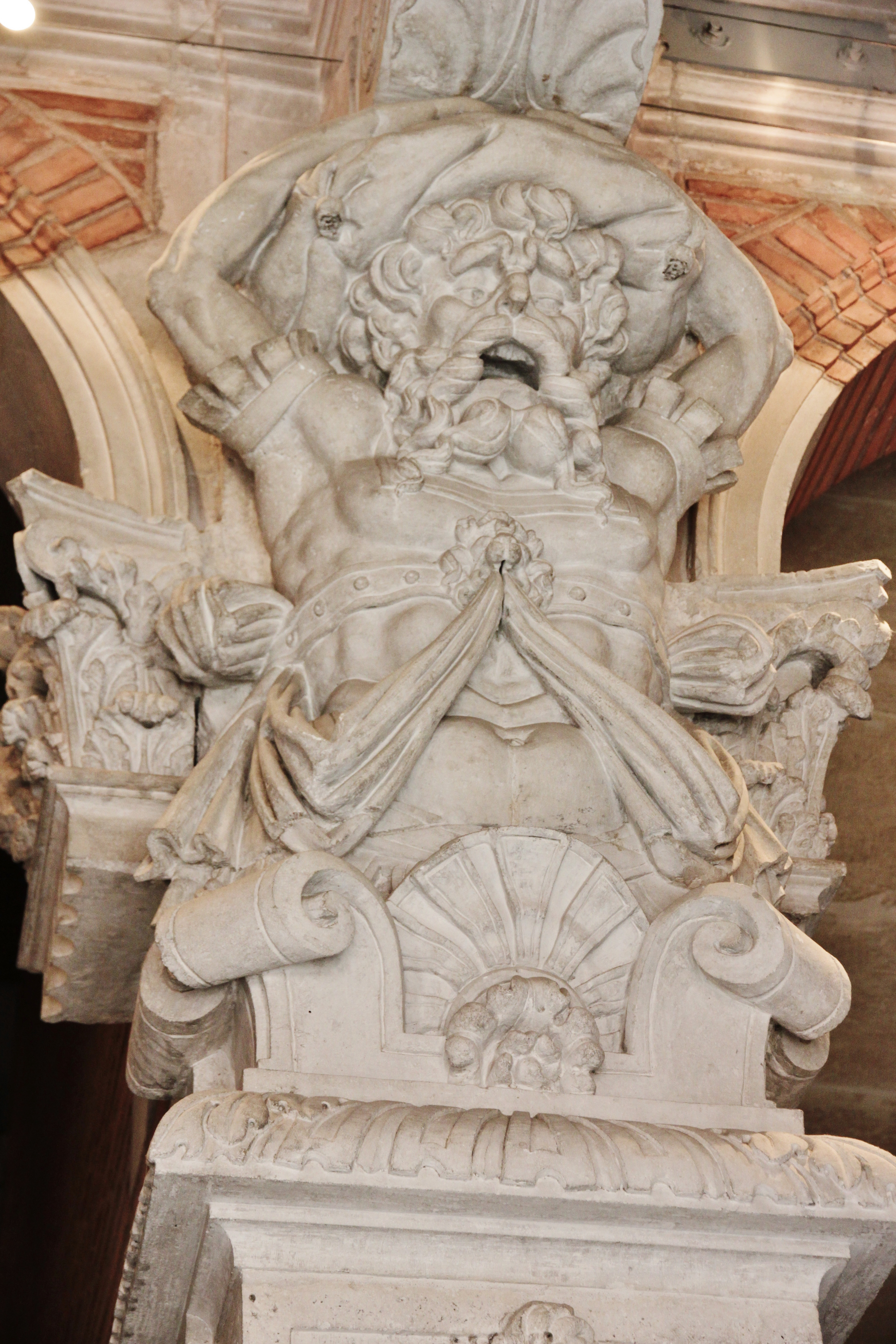
Hôtel d'Assézat (staircase).

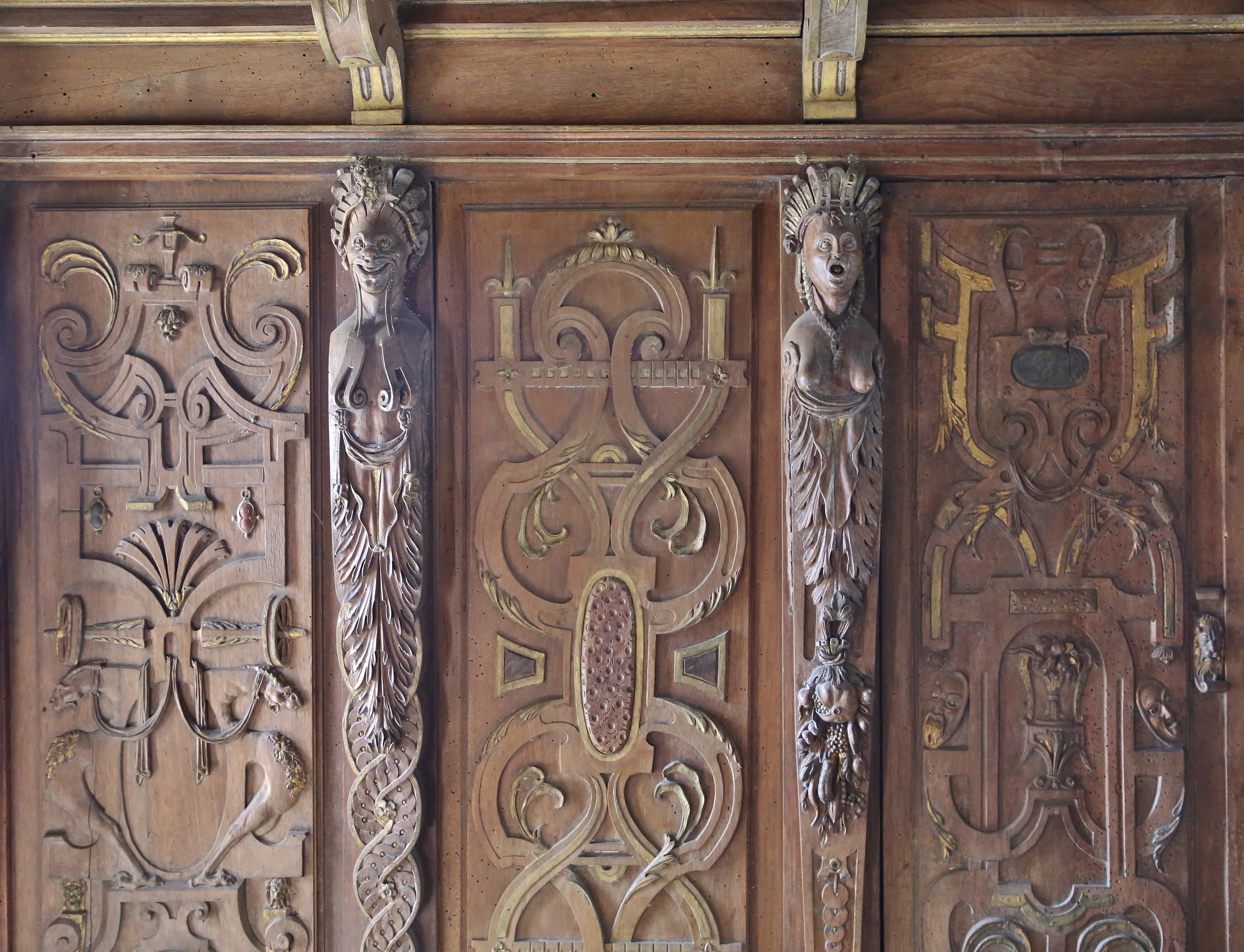
Woodwork of the quatrains' cabinet in the castle of Pibrac.

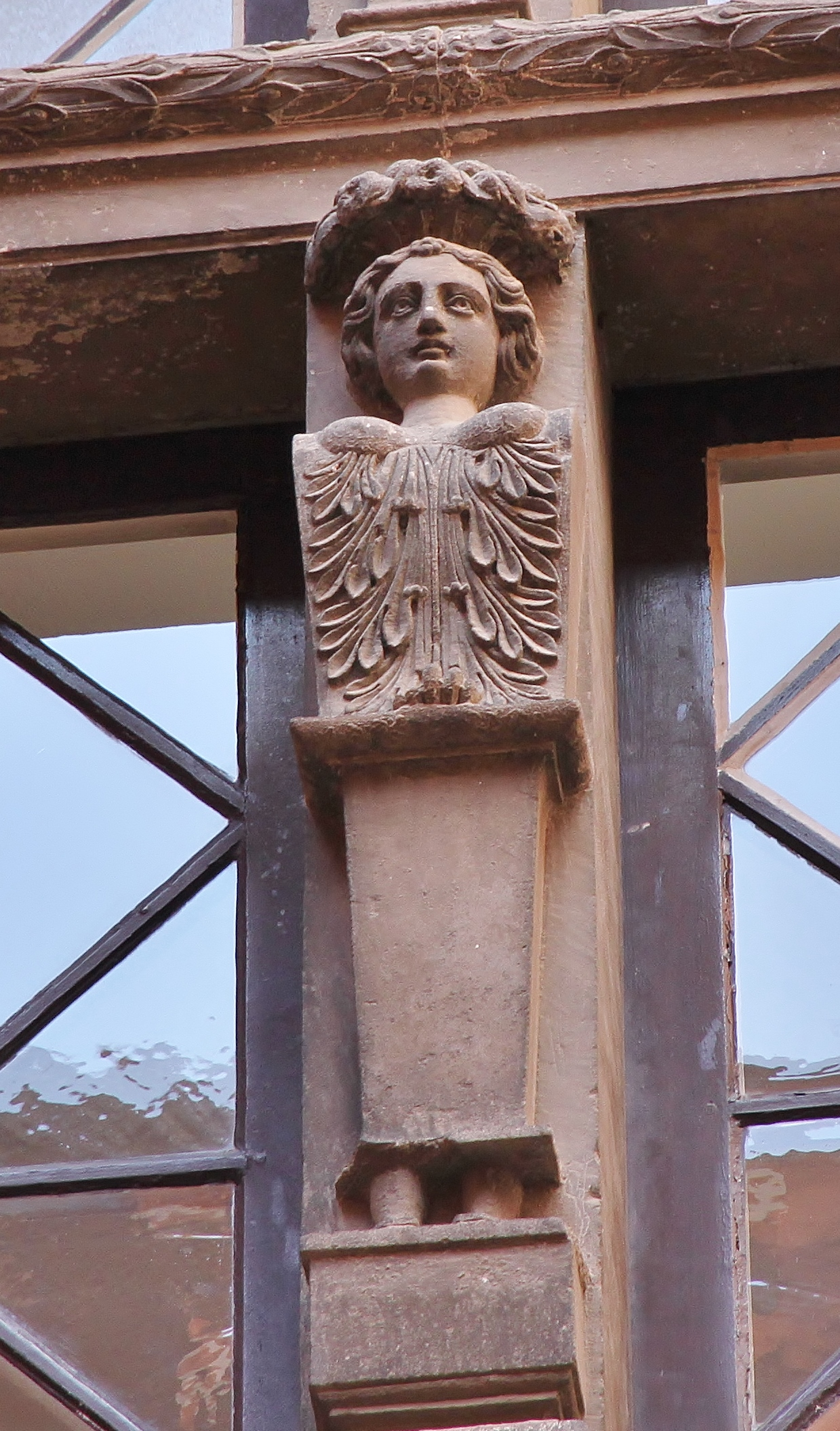
Hôtel de Massas.

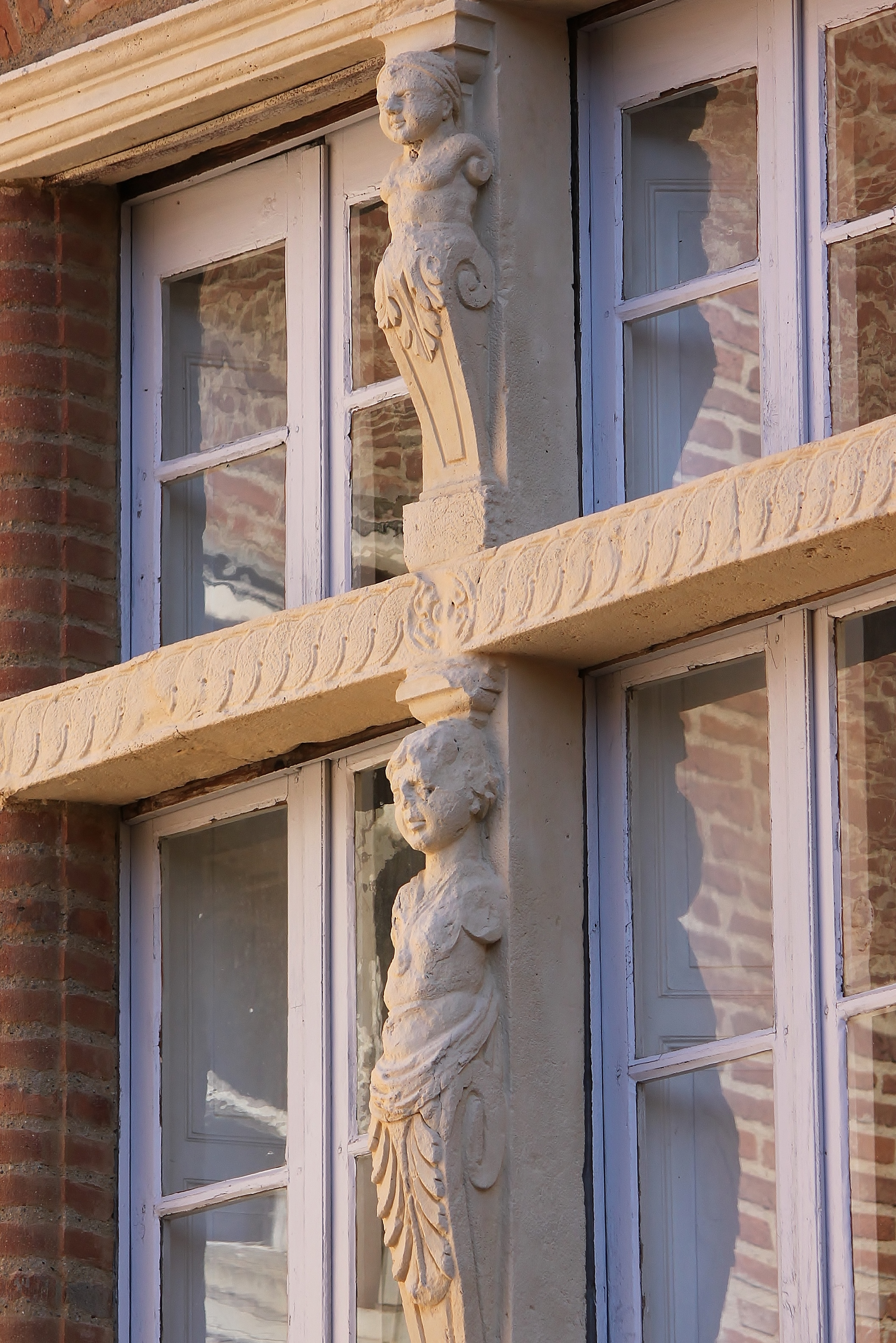
Hôtel Dumay.

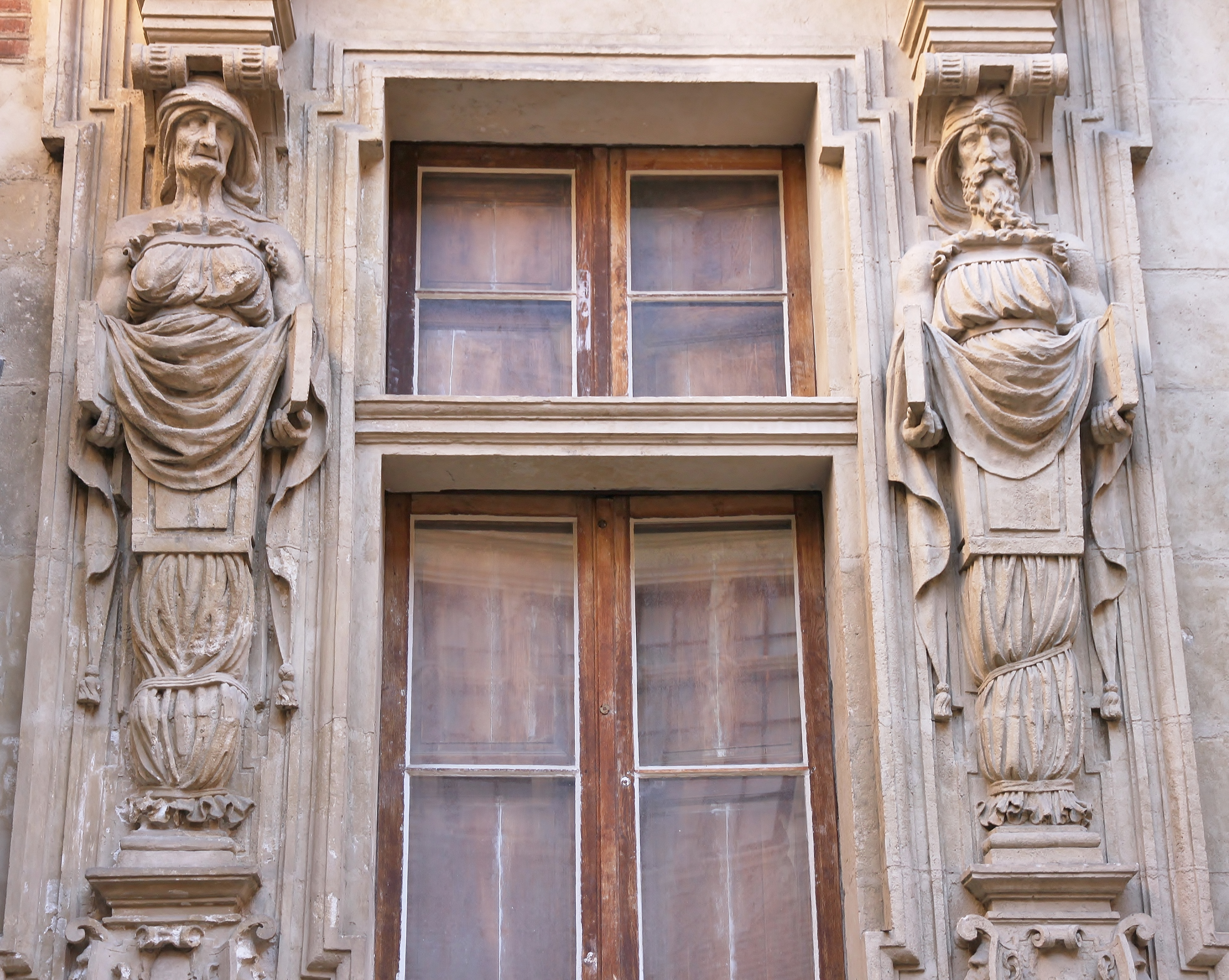
Hôtel du Vieux-Raisin.

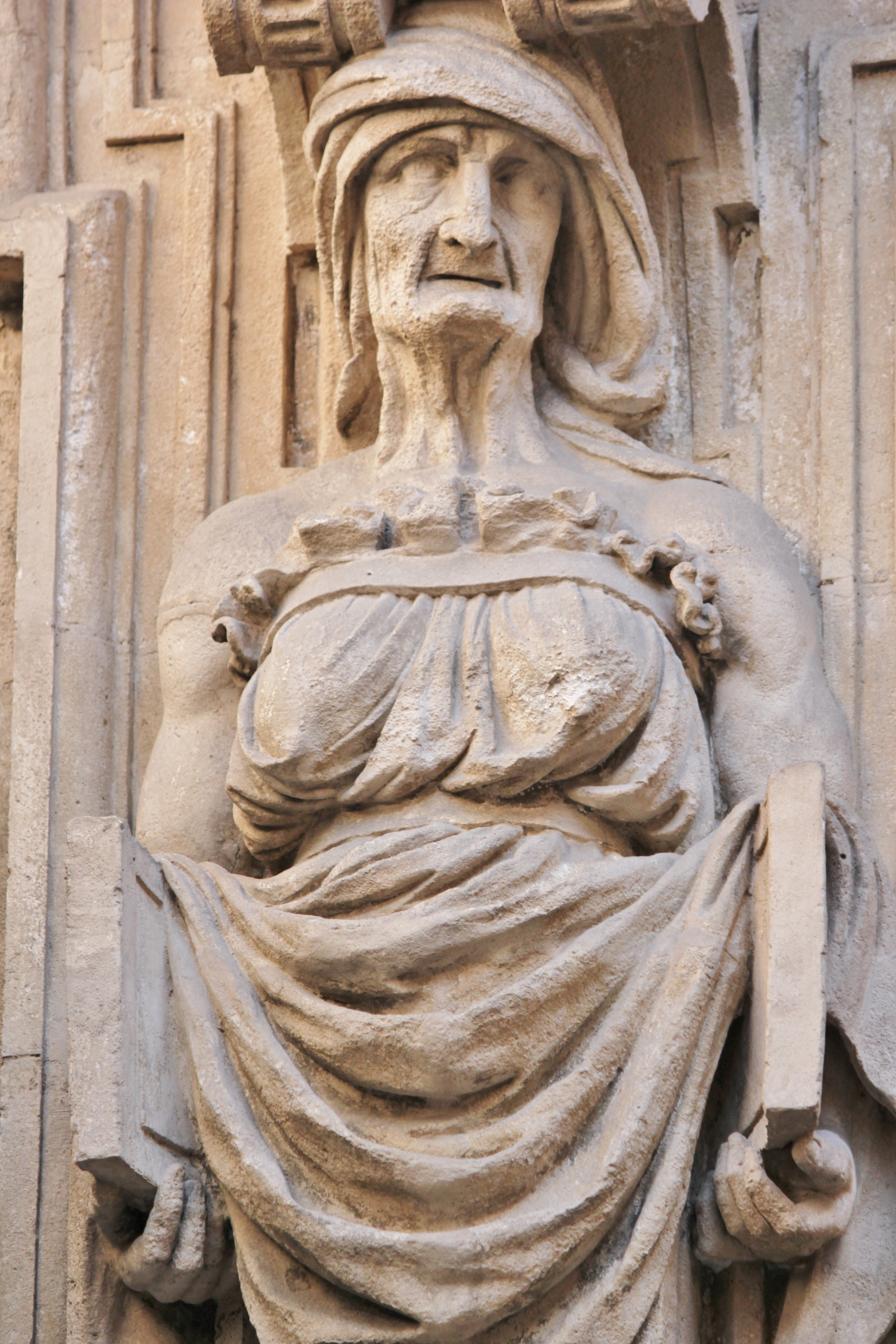
Hôtel du Vieux-Raisin.

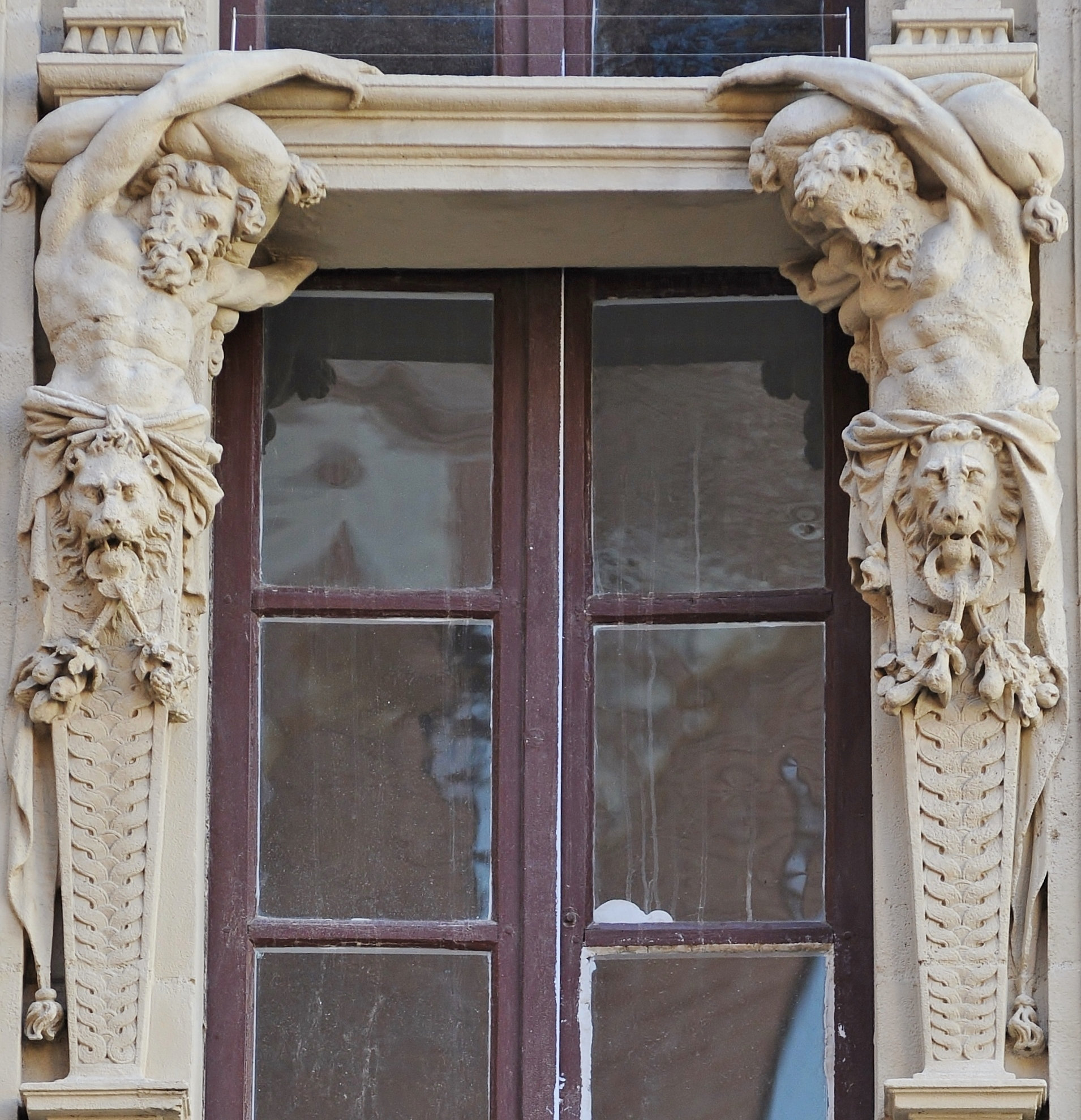
Hôtel du Vieux-Raisin.

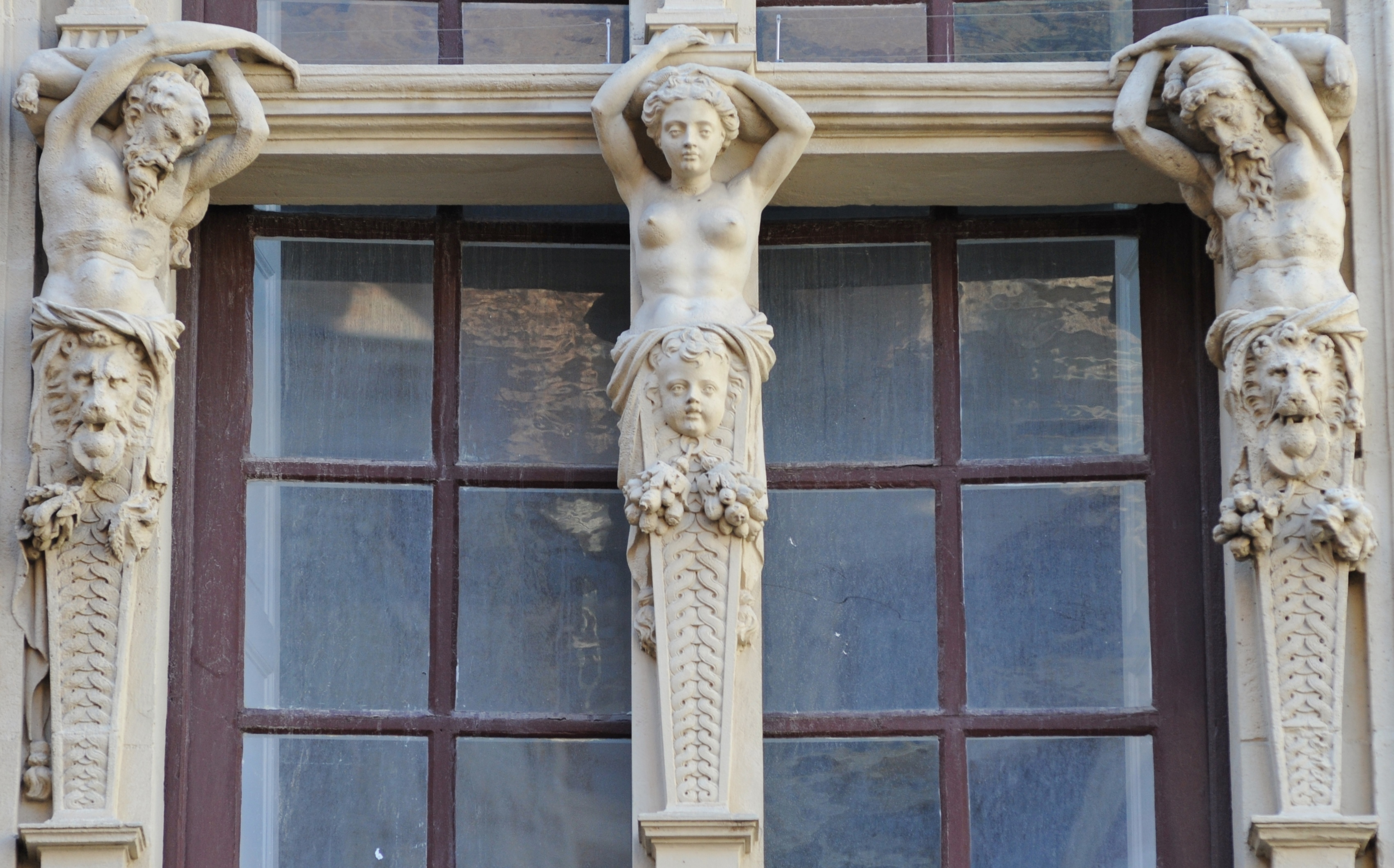
Hôtel du Vieux-Raisin.

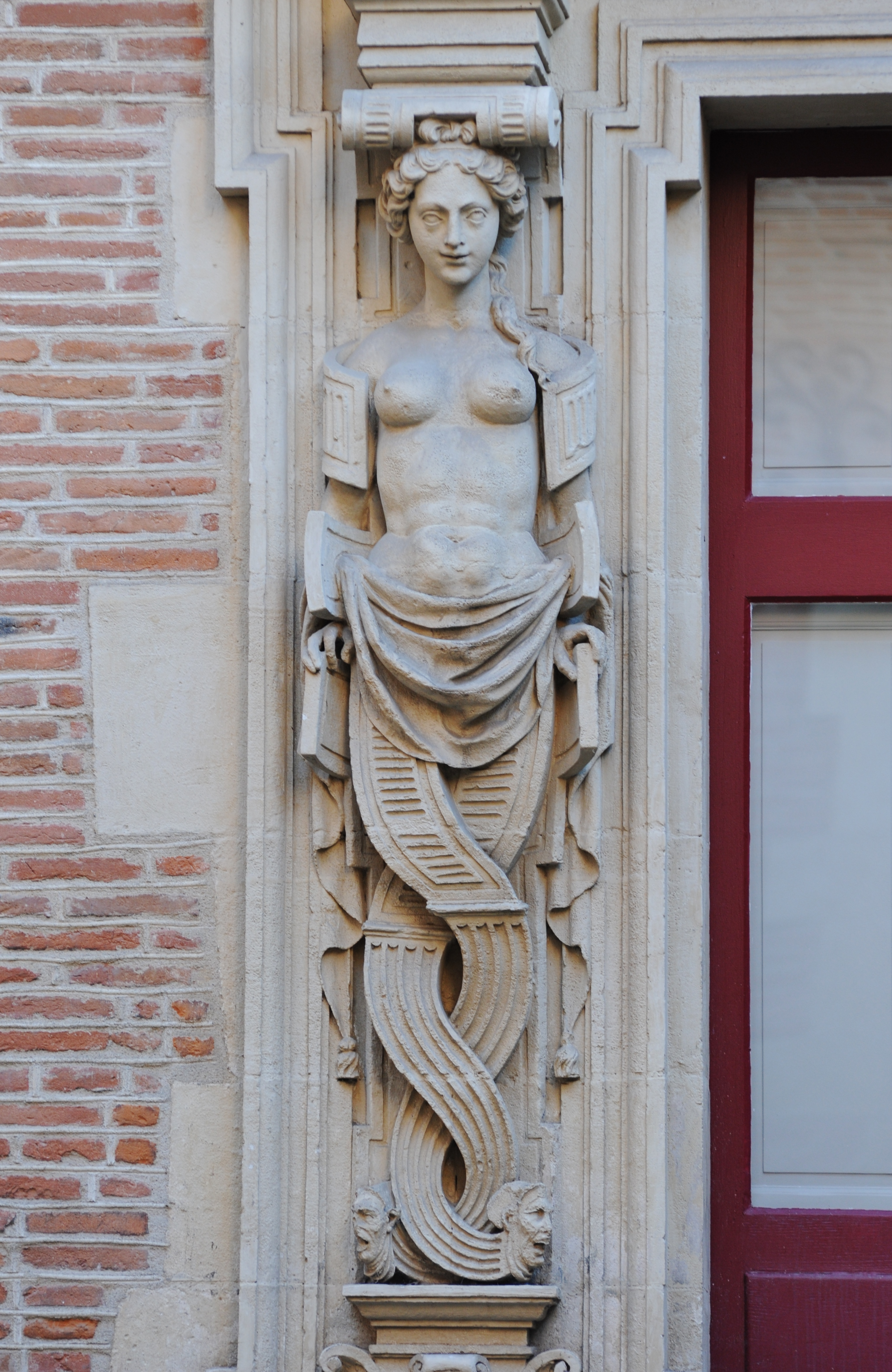
Hôtel du Vieux-Raisin.

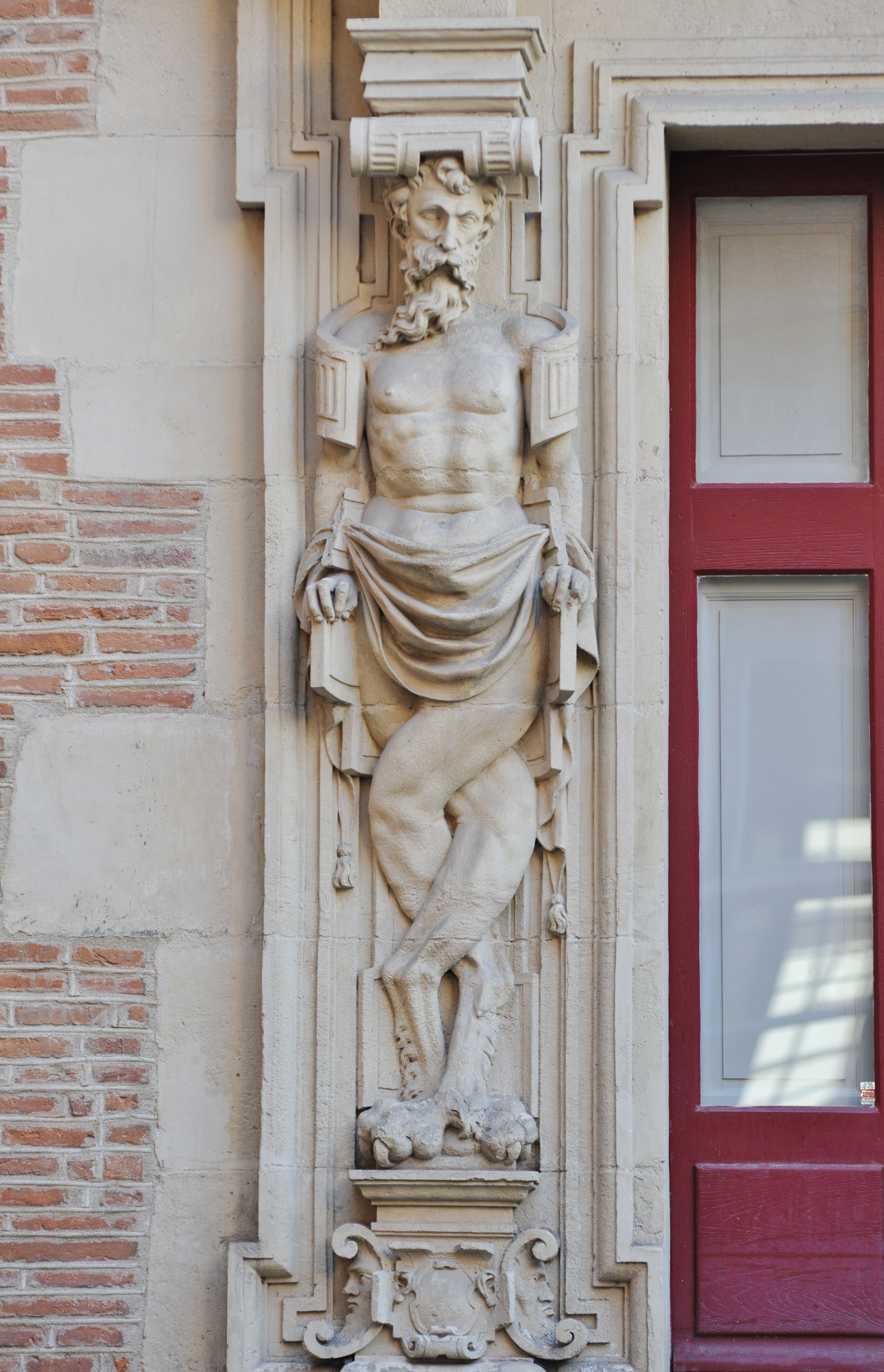
Hôtel du Vieux-Raisin.

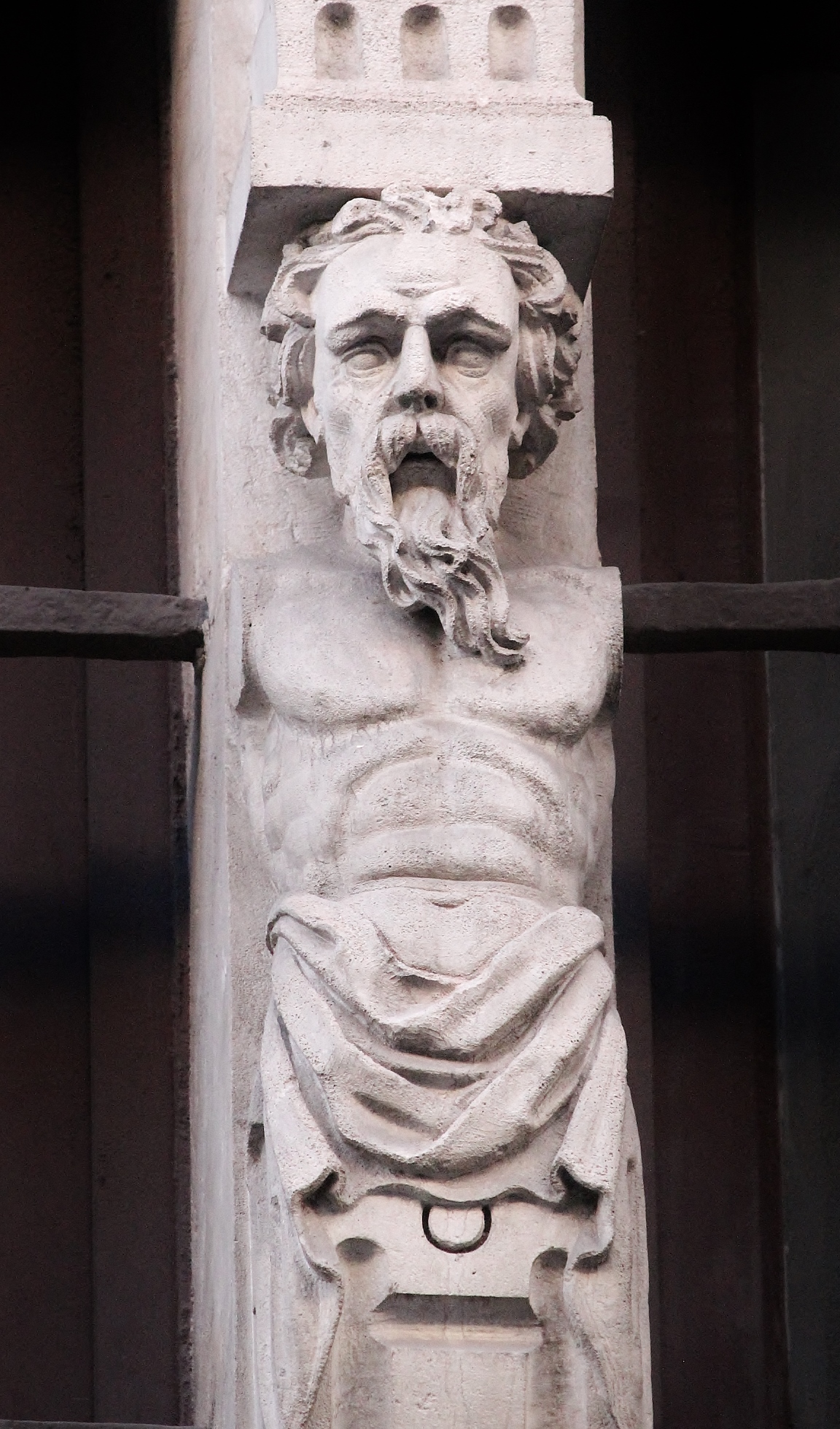
Hôtel de Clary.

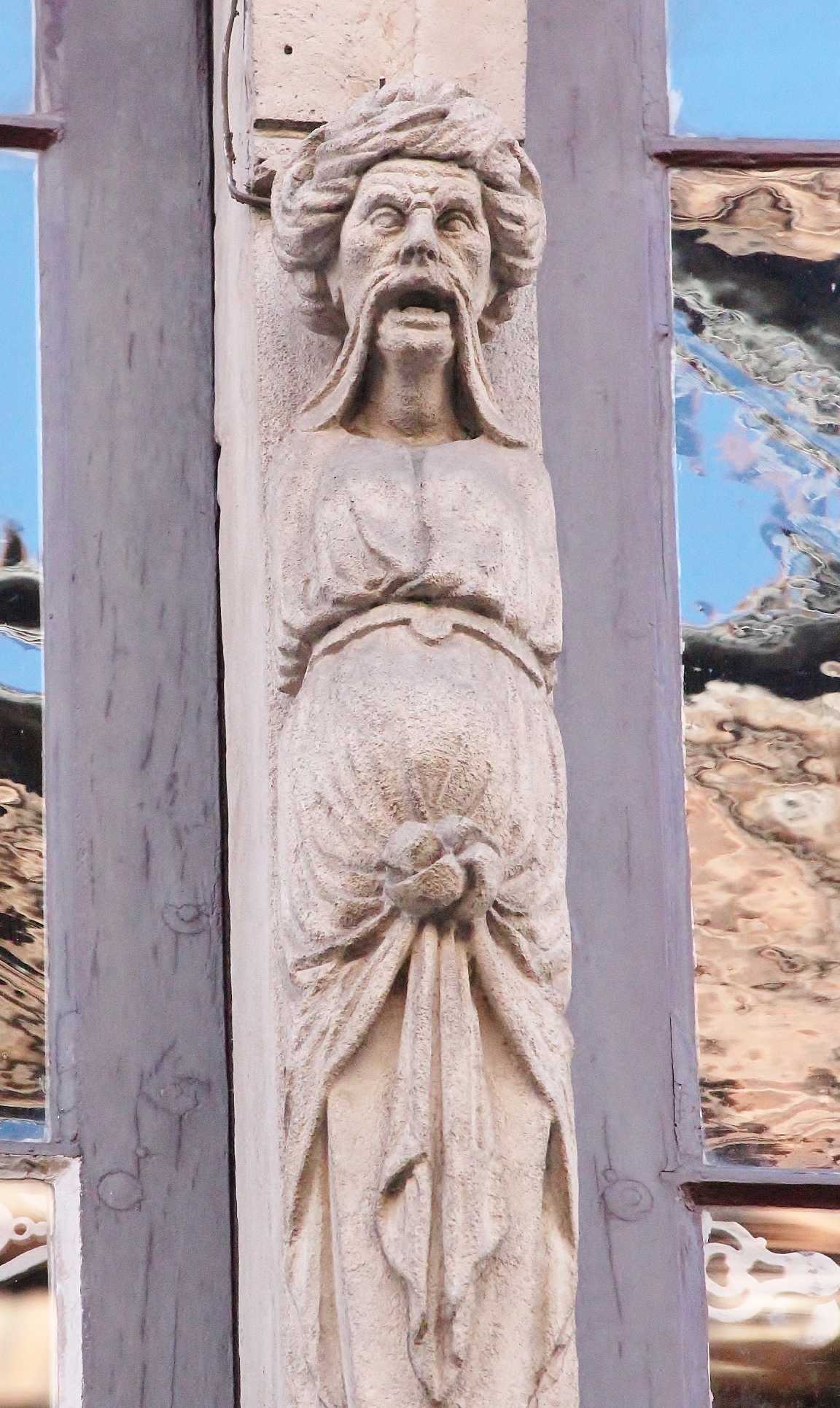
Hôtel de Clary.

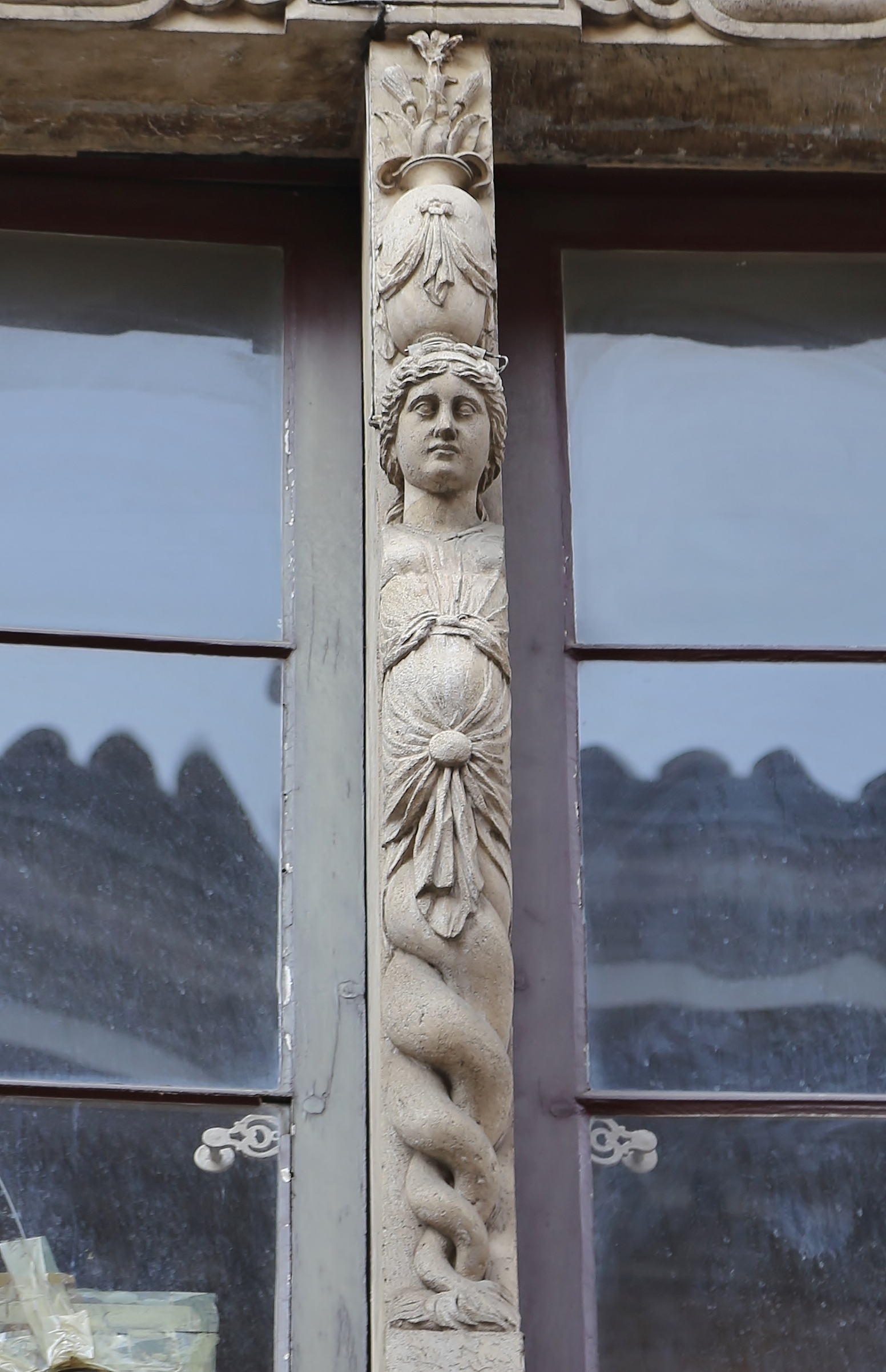
Hôtel de Clary.

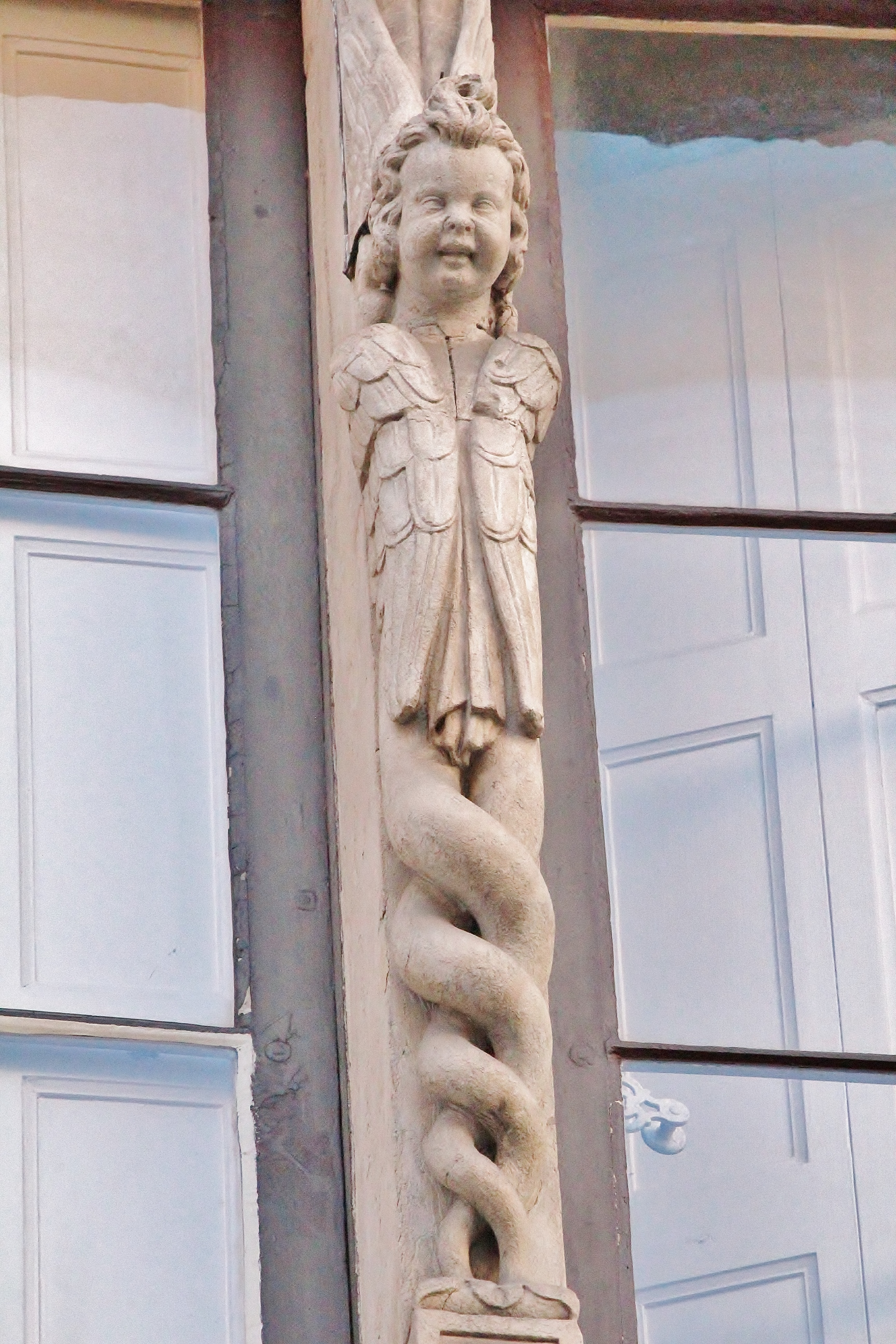
Hôtel de Clary.

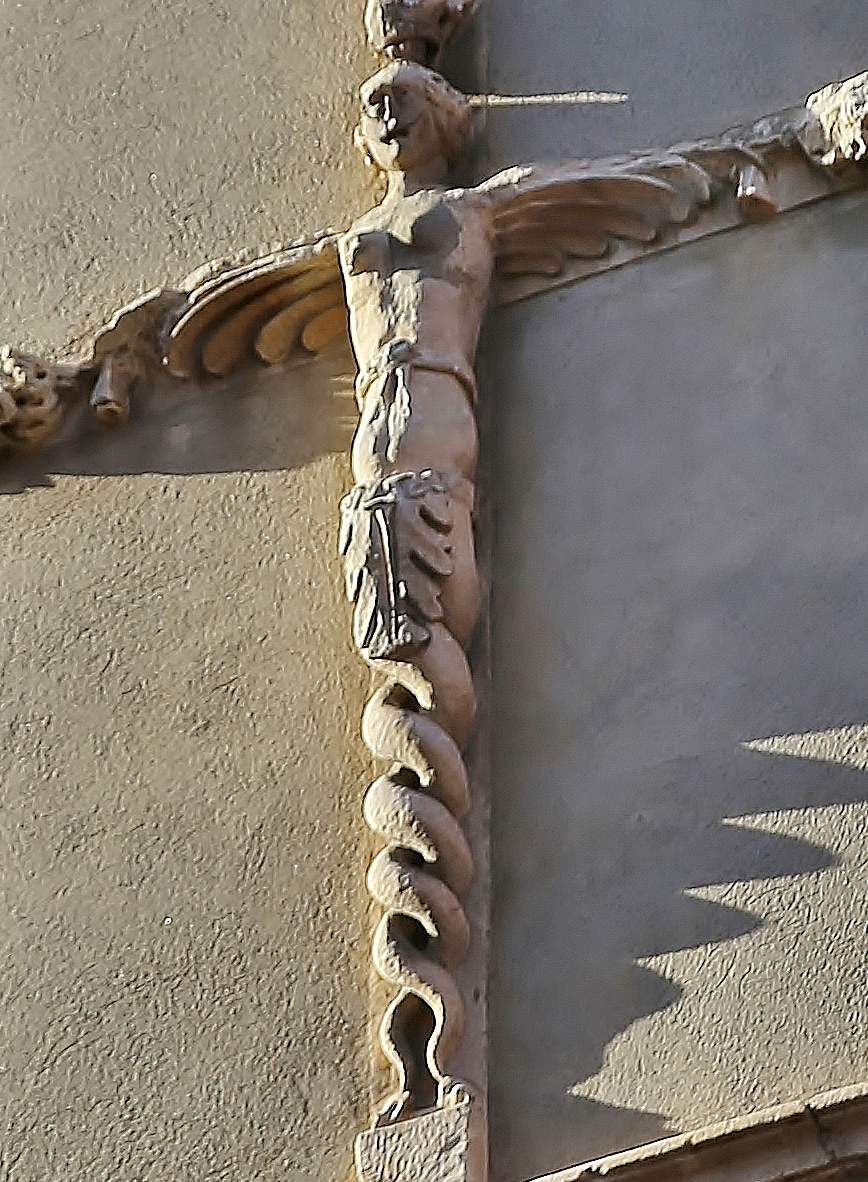
Term in the shape of a siren spreading its wings.

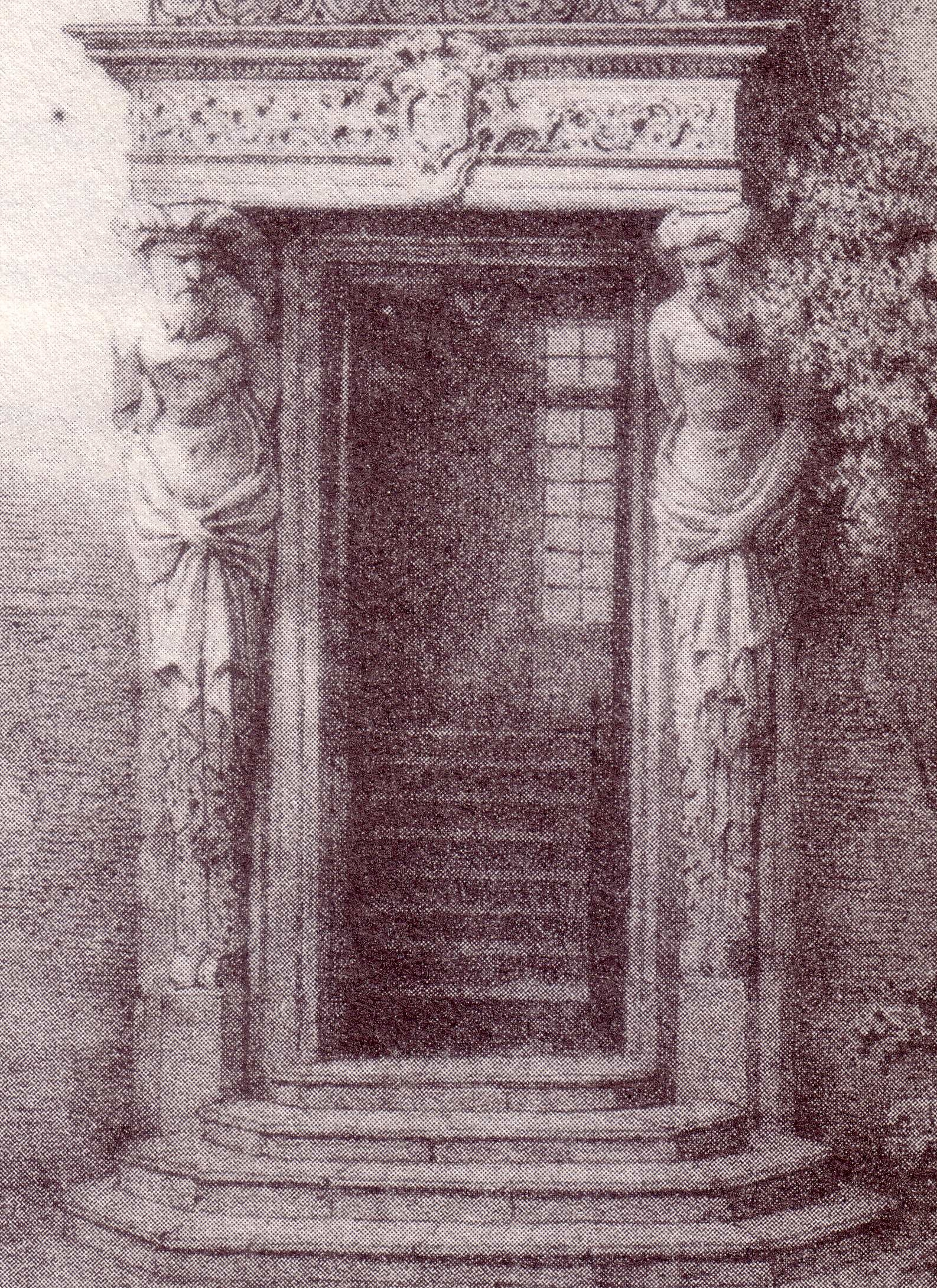
Terms disappeared from the hotel Desplats (or Palaminy), early 17th century.

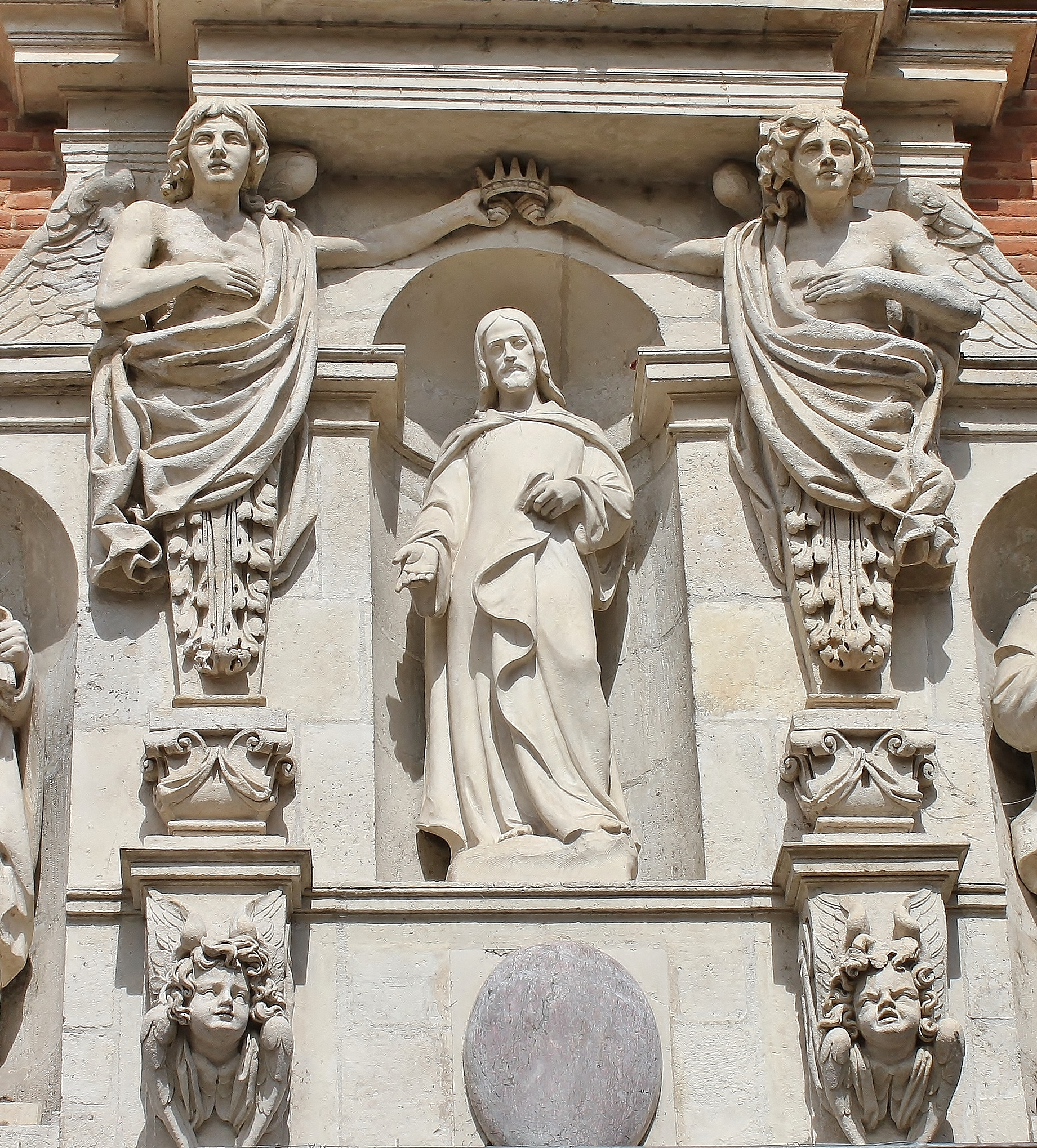
Winged terms on the gate of Saint-Pierre des Chartreux.

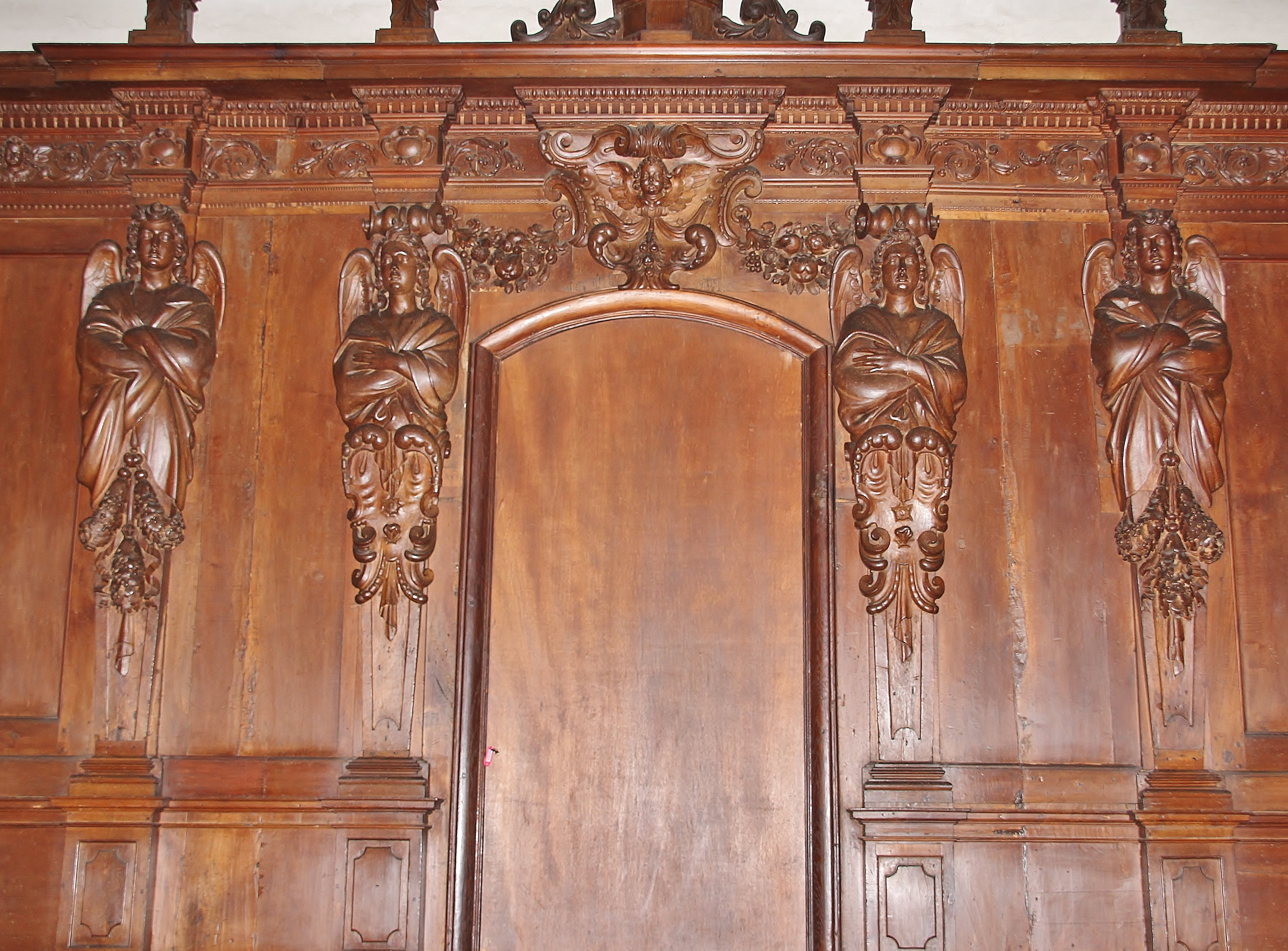
Winged terms in the Holy Cross chapel of the Chartreux church (sculptor Artus Legoust).

=== Mannerist ornaments ===
Mannerist aesthetics, based on the unusual and the association of opposites, where the mineral, plant and animal kingdoms merge, uses refined motifs, polychromy (brick and stone) and ornaments (cabochons, diamond points, masks) evoking luxury, surprise and abundance.

Influenced by the art of Fontainebleau, the Toulouse Mannerist decorations are inspired by the stuccoes of Rosso and the paintings of Primaticcio. This particularly ornate and exuberant art seduced clients as much as the classical orders and was, at the time, considered to be just as classical.

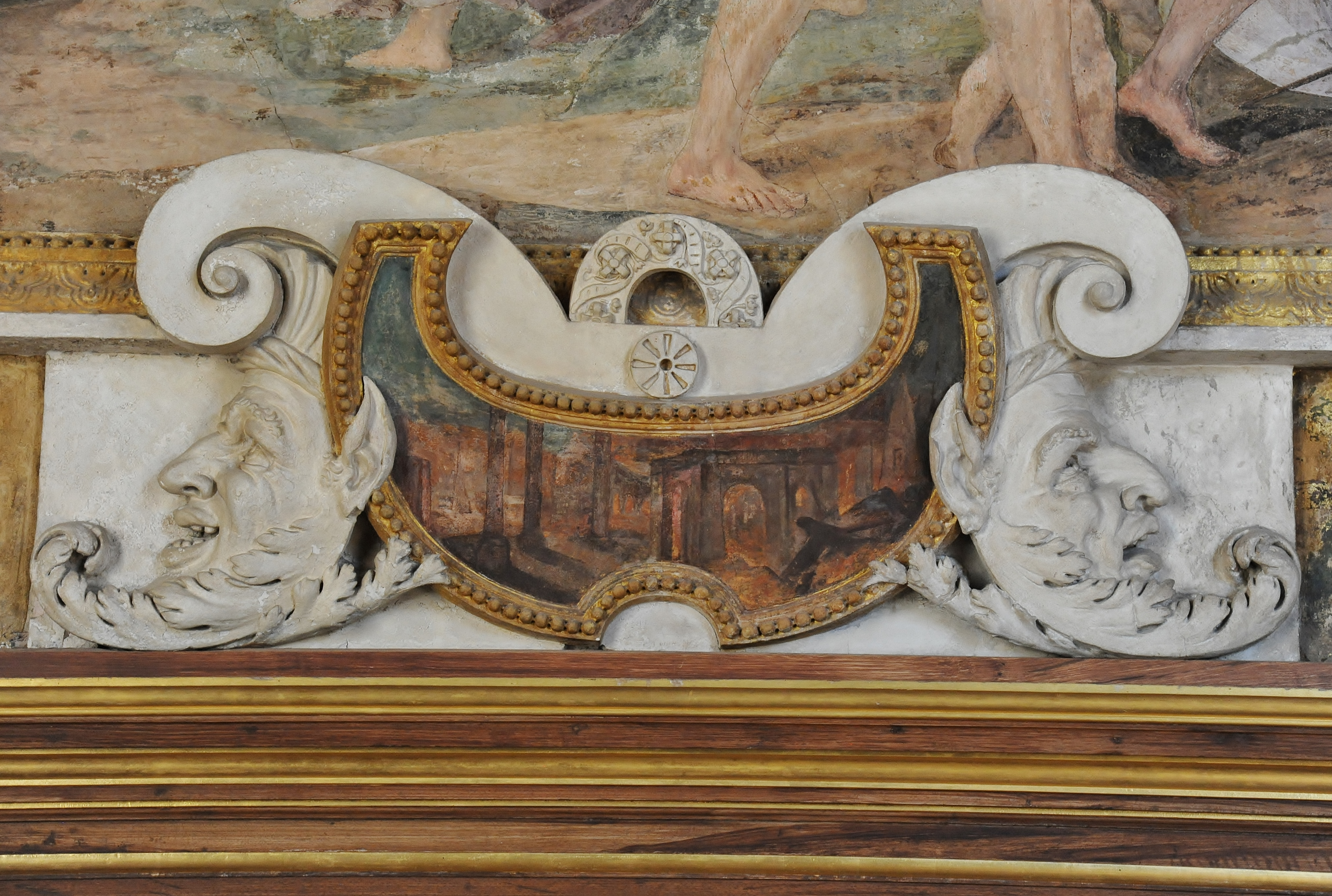
A source of inspiration: the Mannerist stuccos of the Francis I gallery in the Château de Fontainebleau.

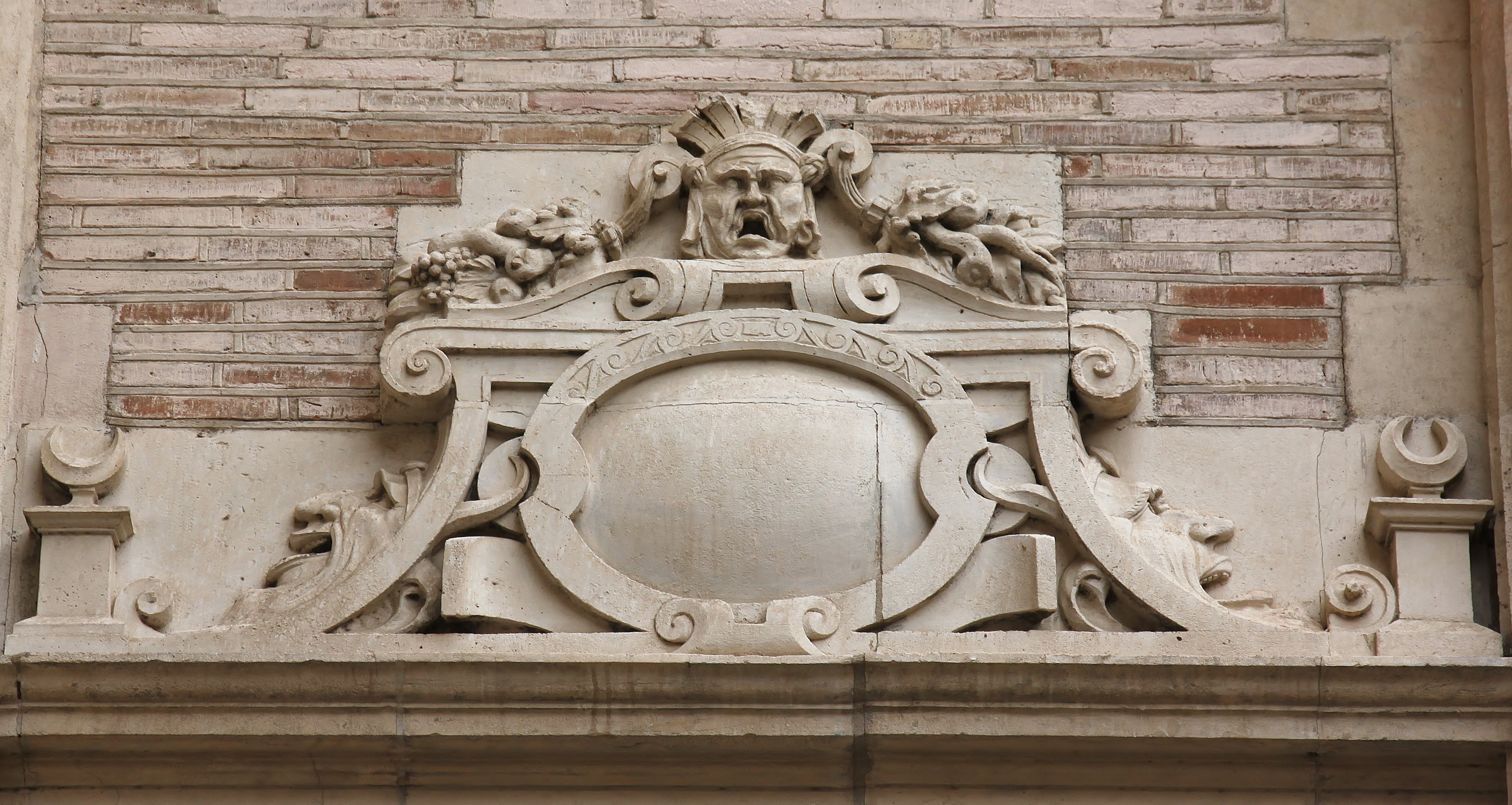
Hôtel d'Assézat: Mannerist decoration similar to the stuccos of Fontainebleau.

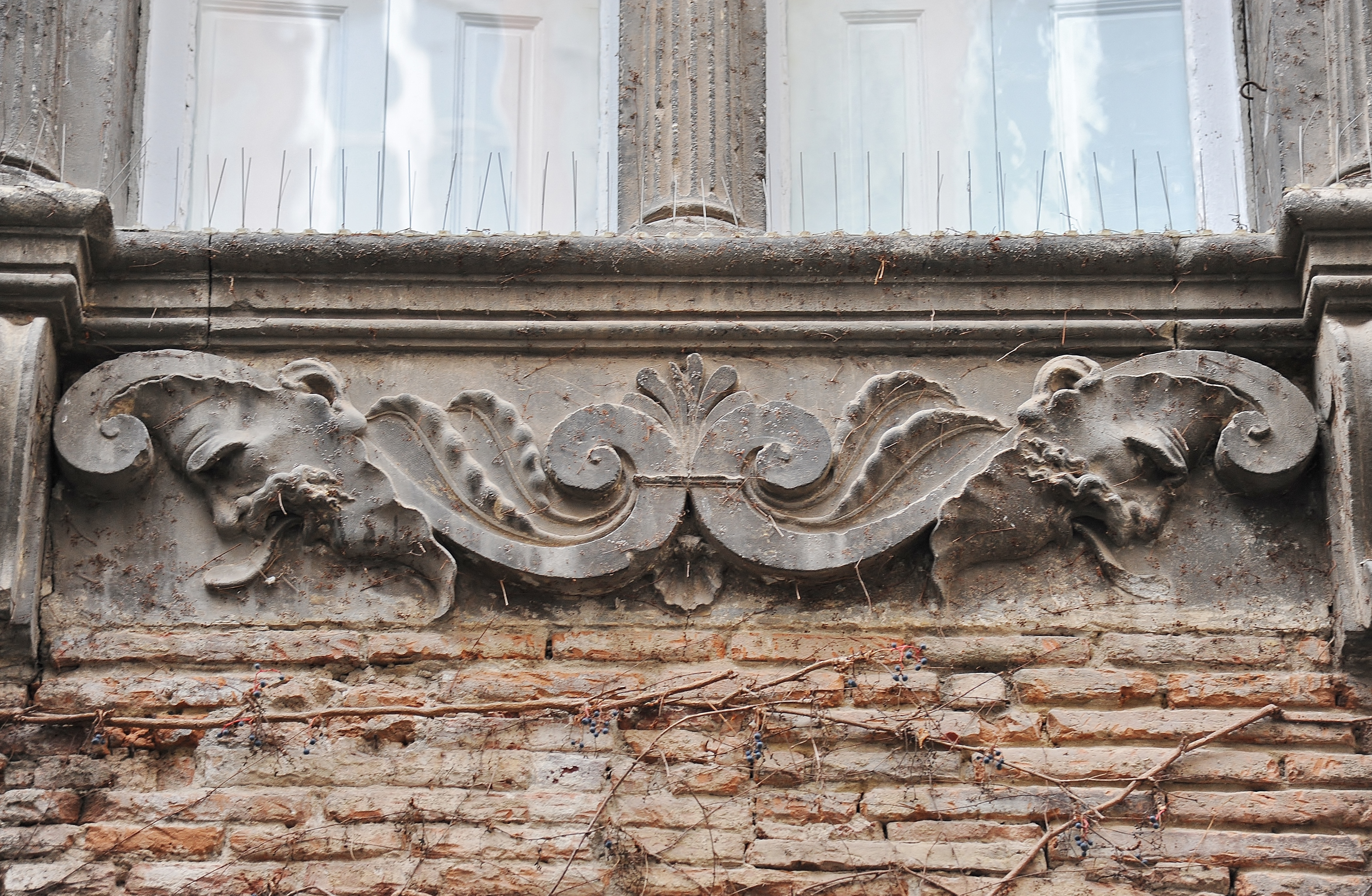
Hôtel de Guillaume de Bernuy: masks.

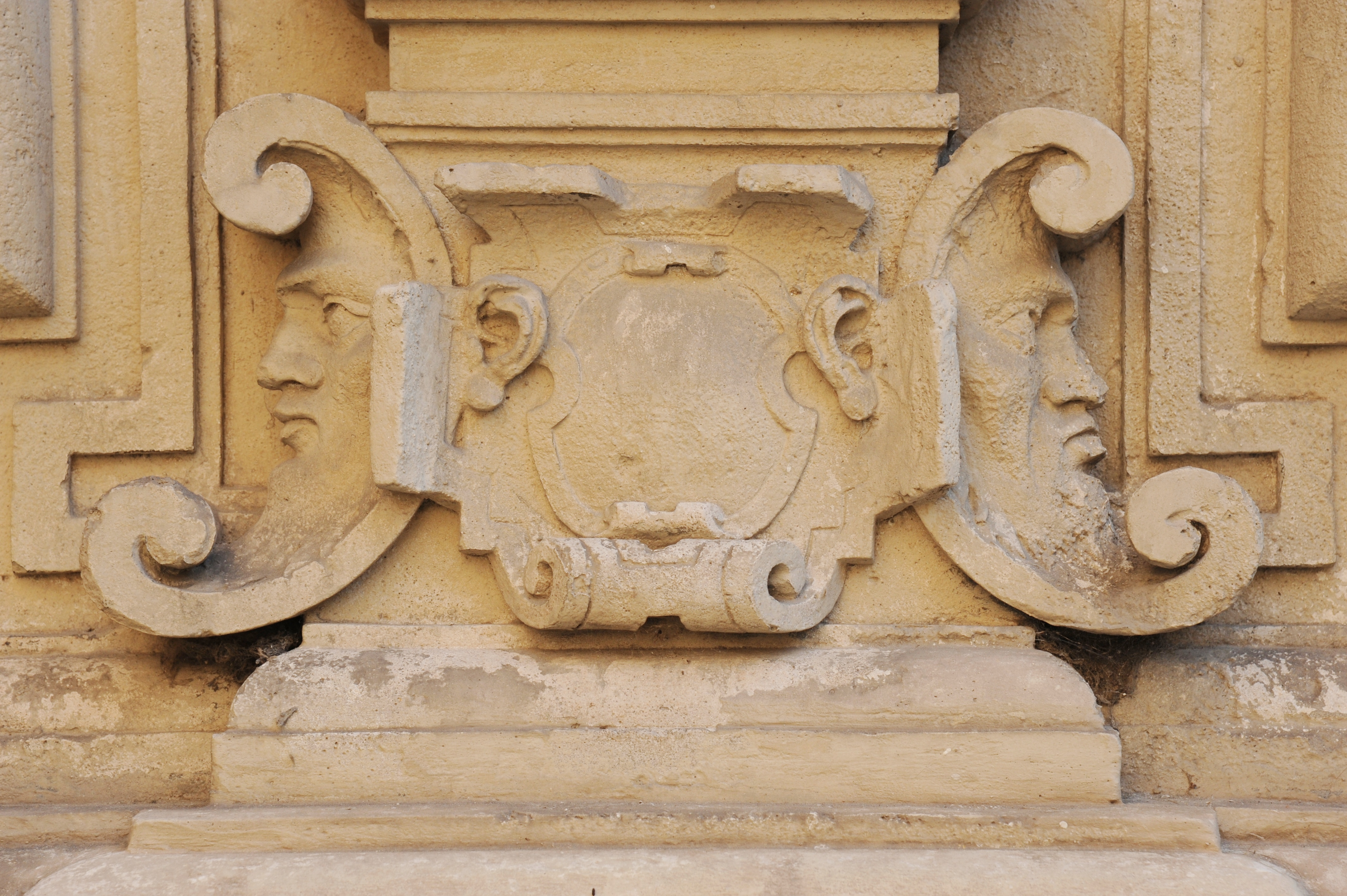
Hôtel du Vieux-Raisin.

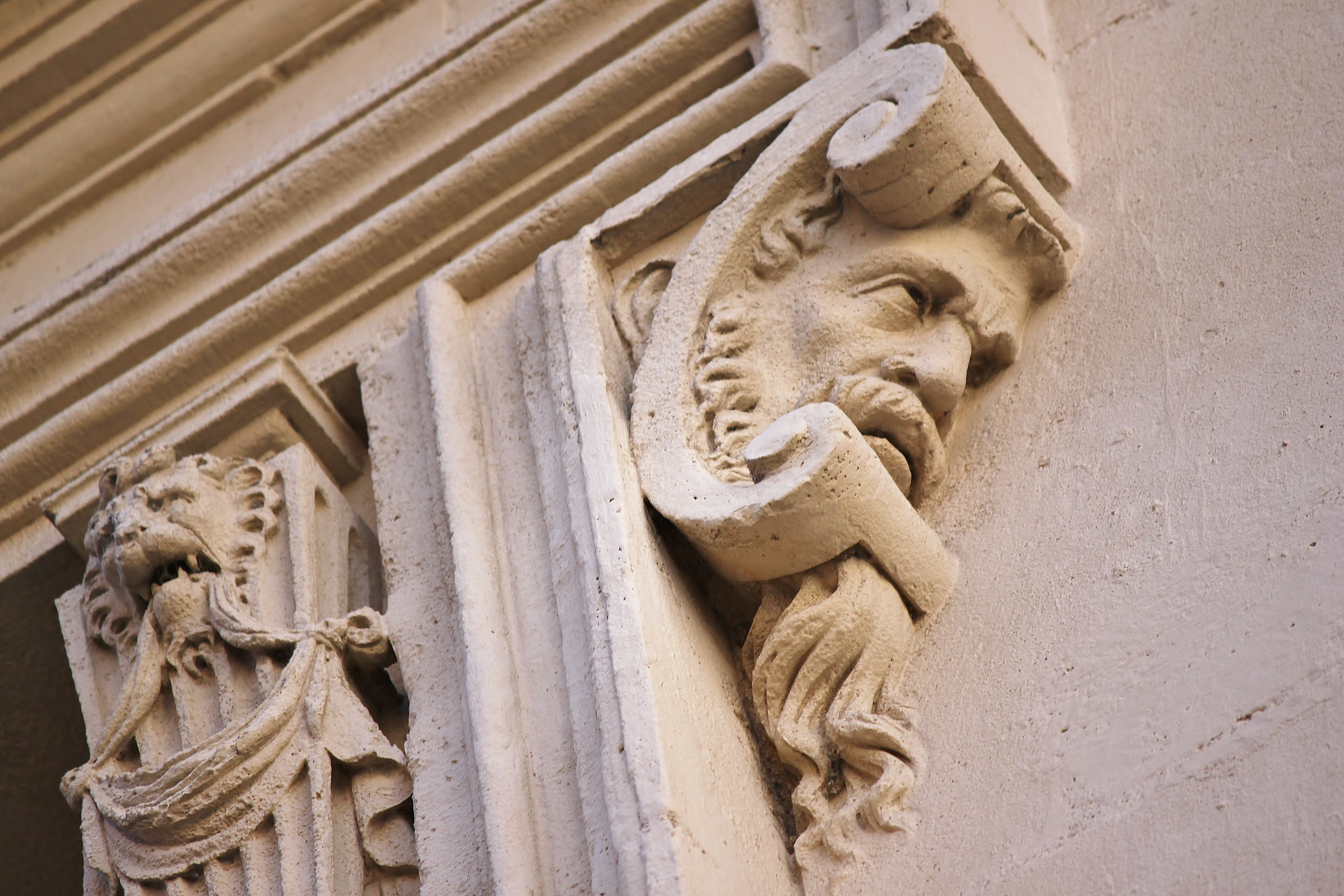
Hôtel du Vieux-Raisin.

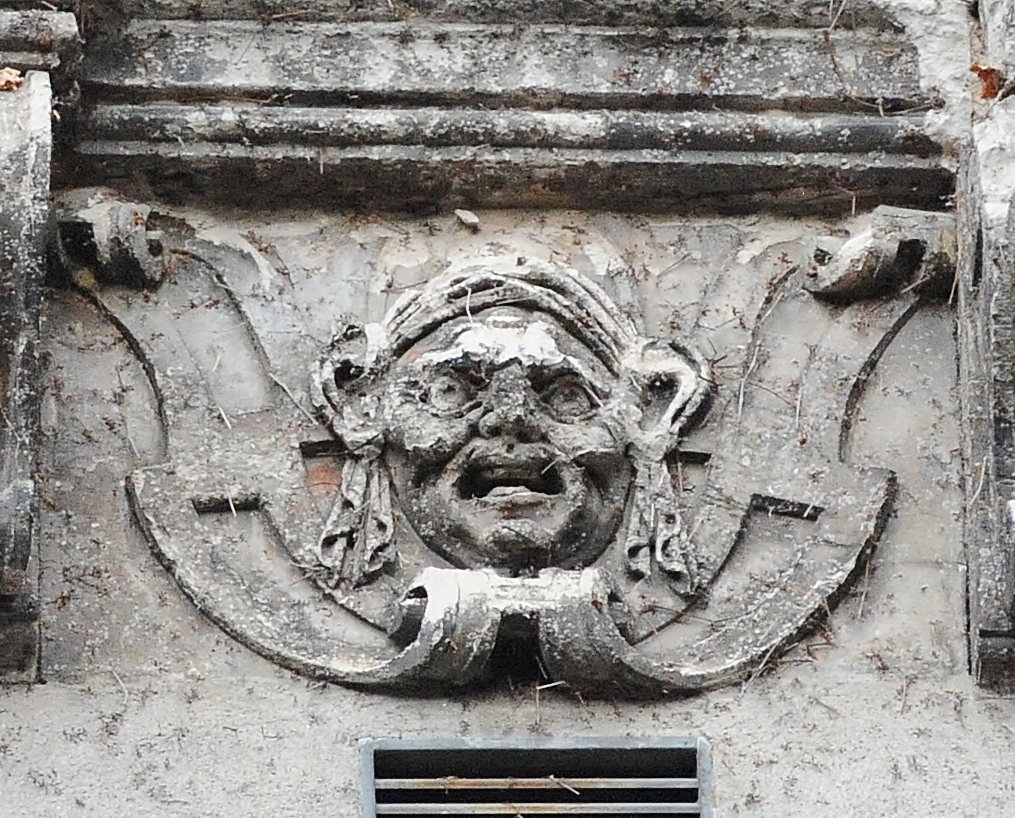
Hôtel de Guillaume de Bernuy: masks.

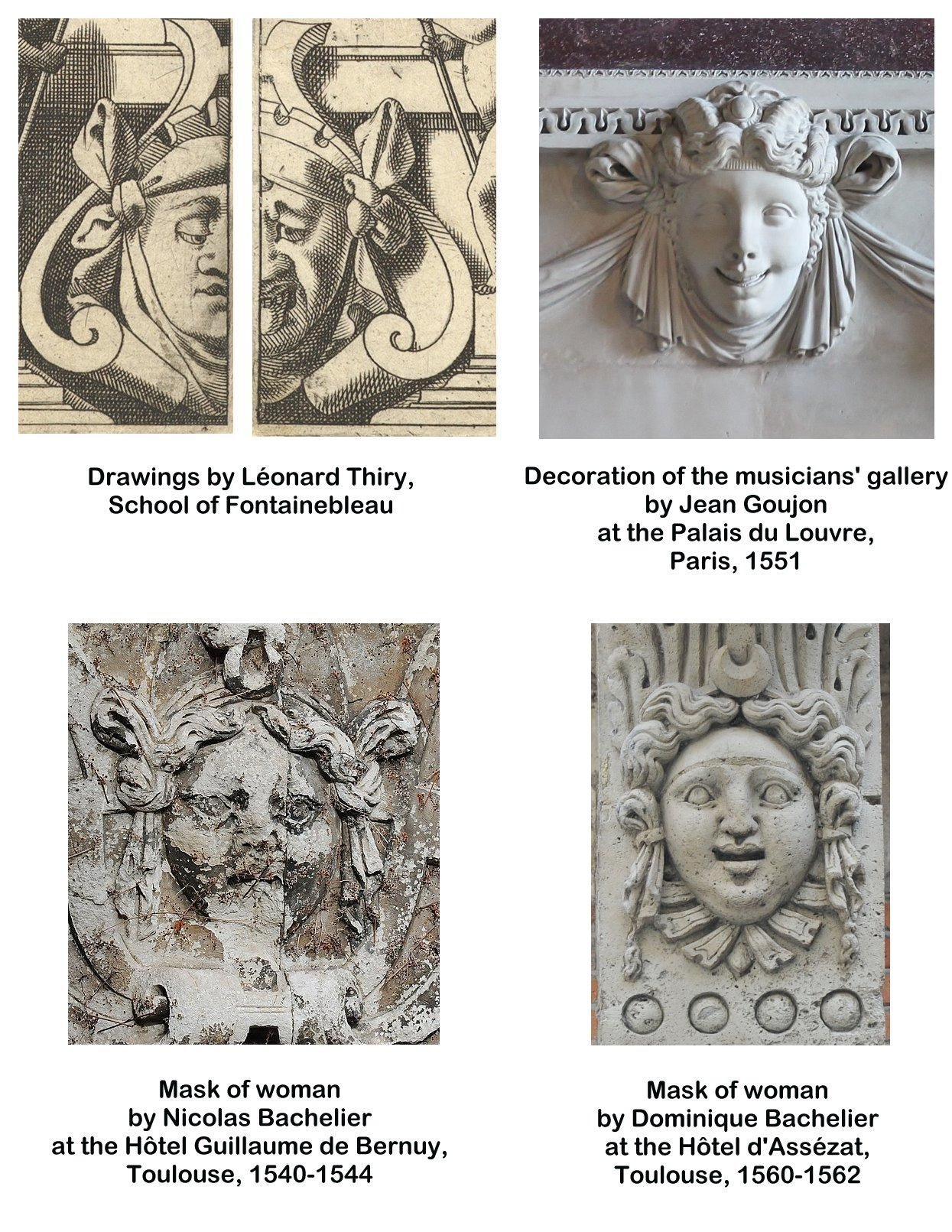
Masks.

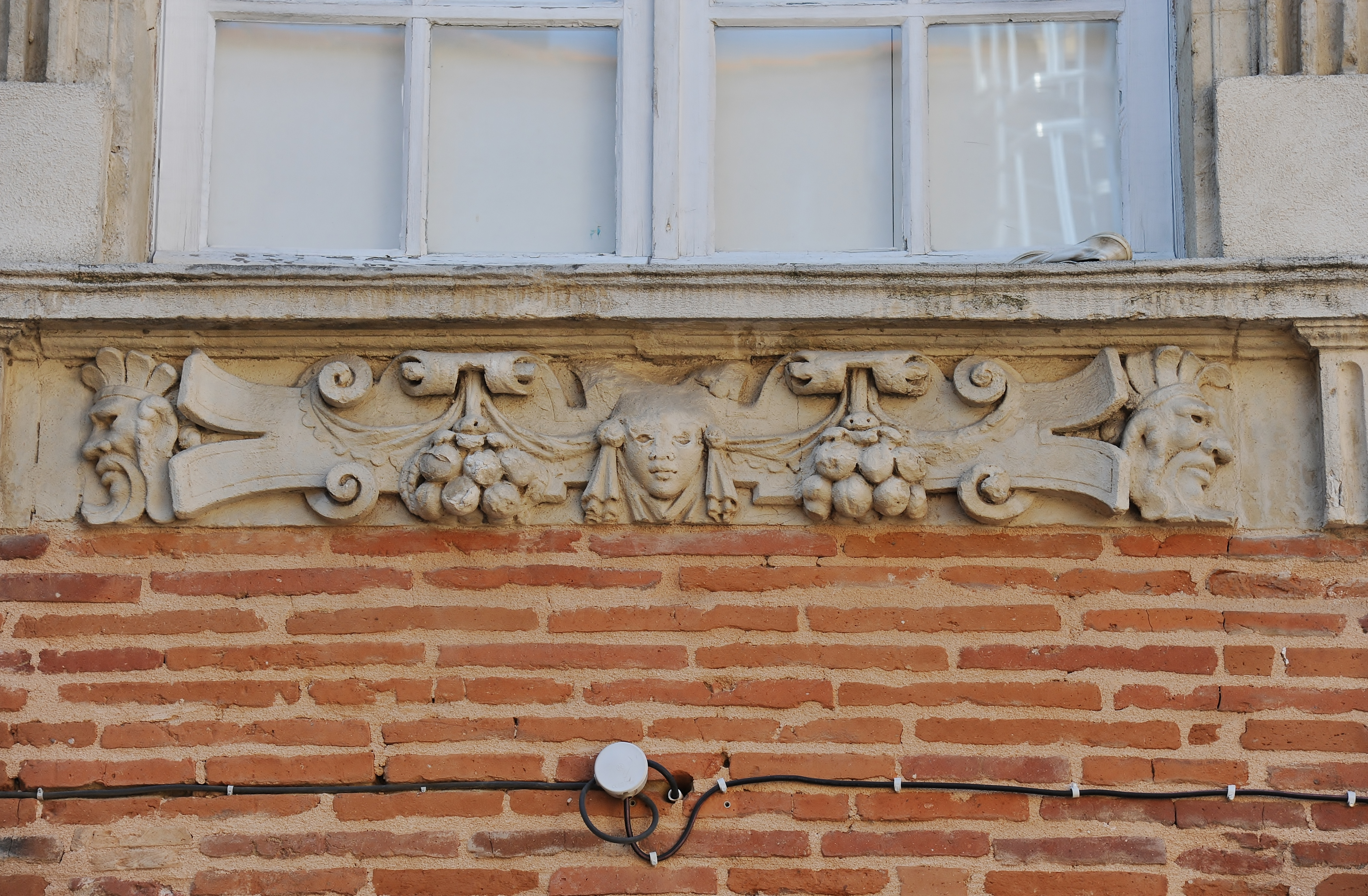
House of Auger Ferrier.

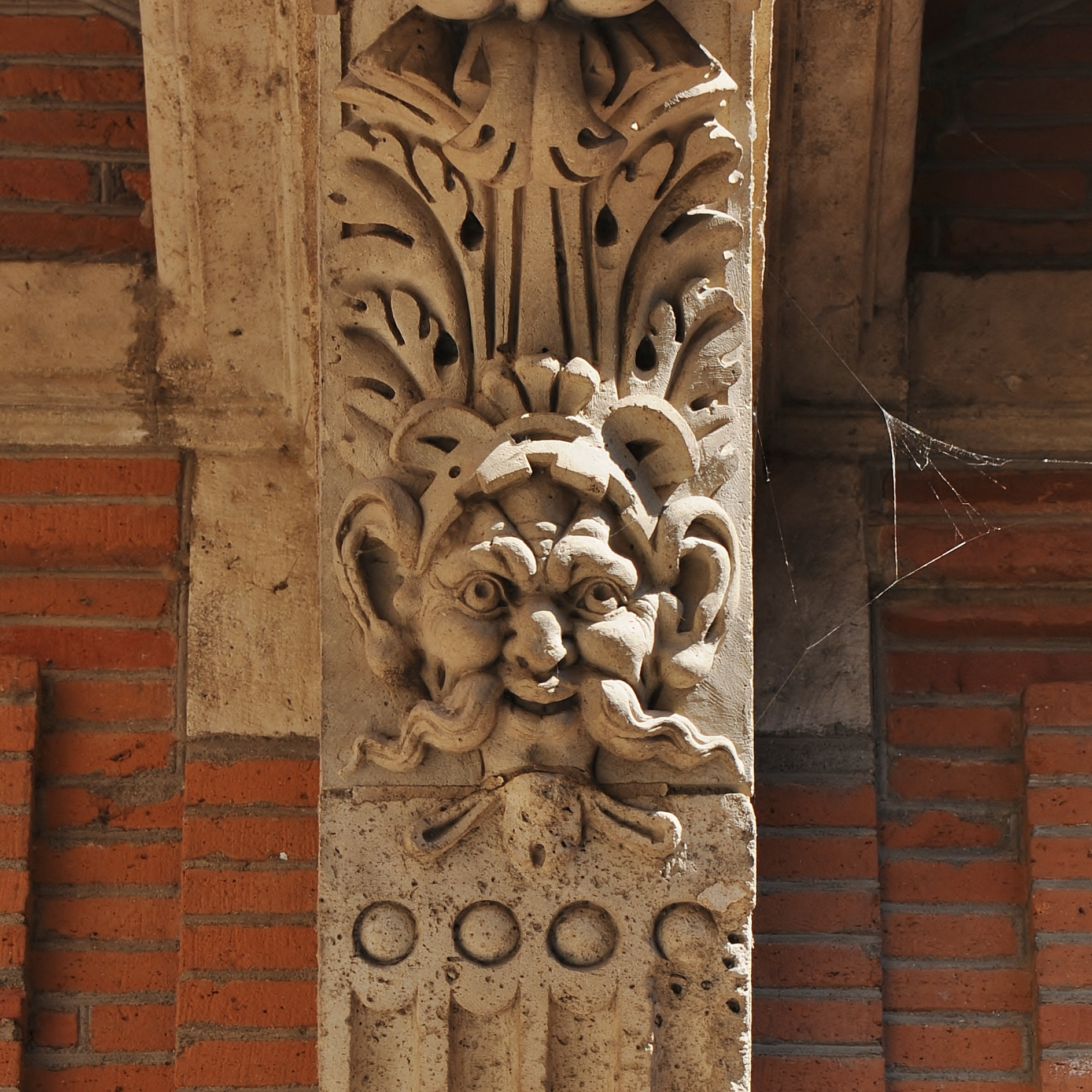
Hôtel d'Assézat: masks.

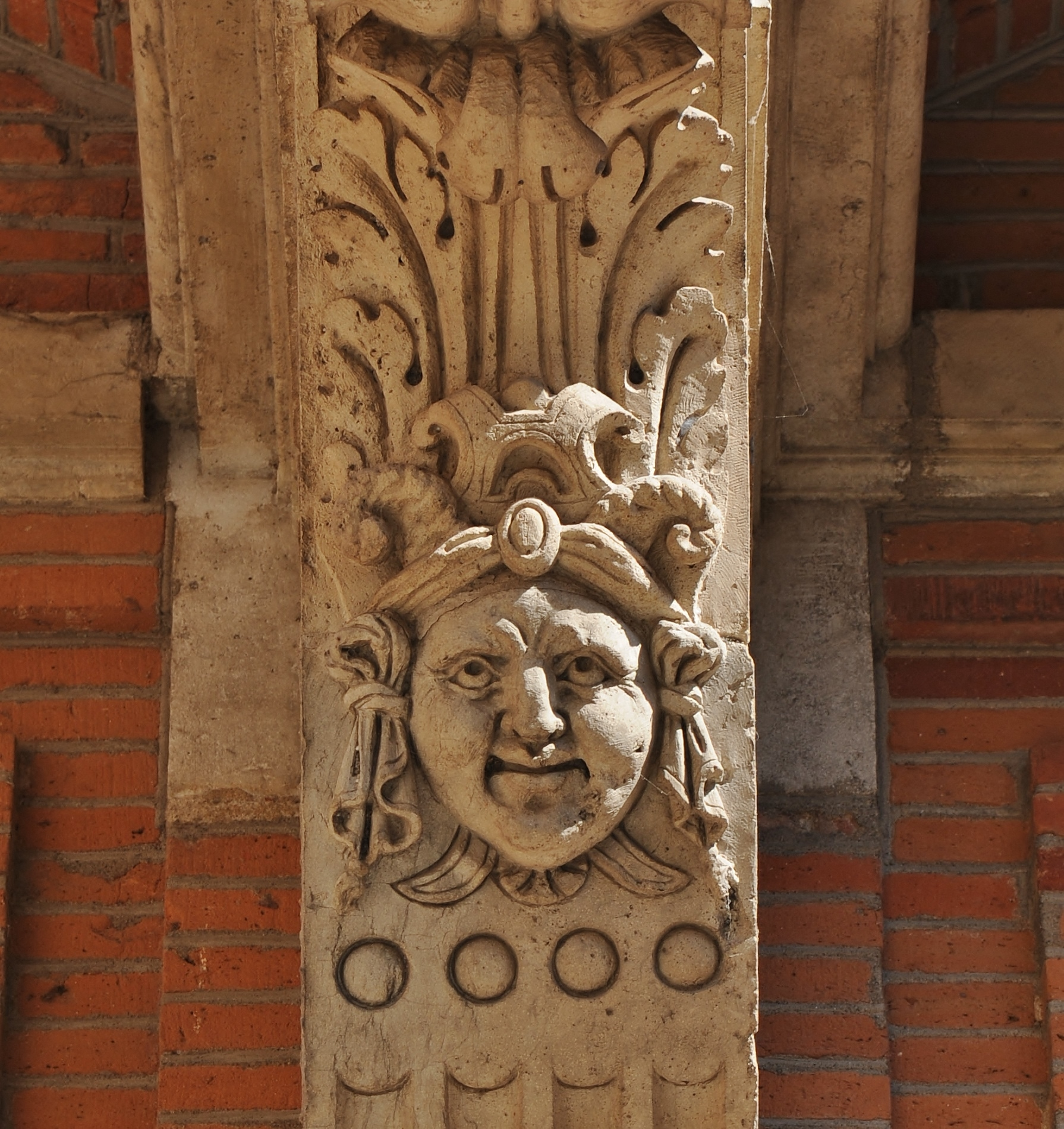
Hôtel d'Assézat: masks.

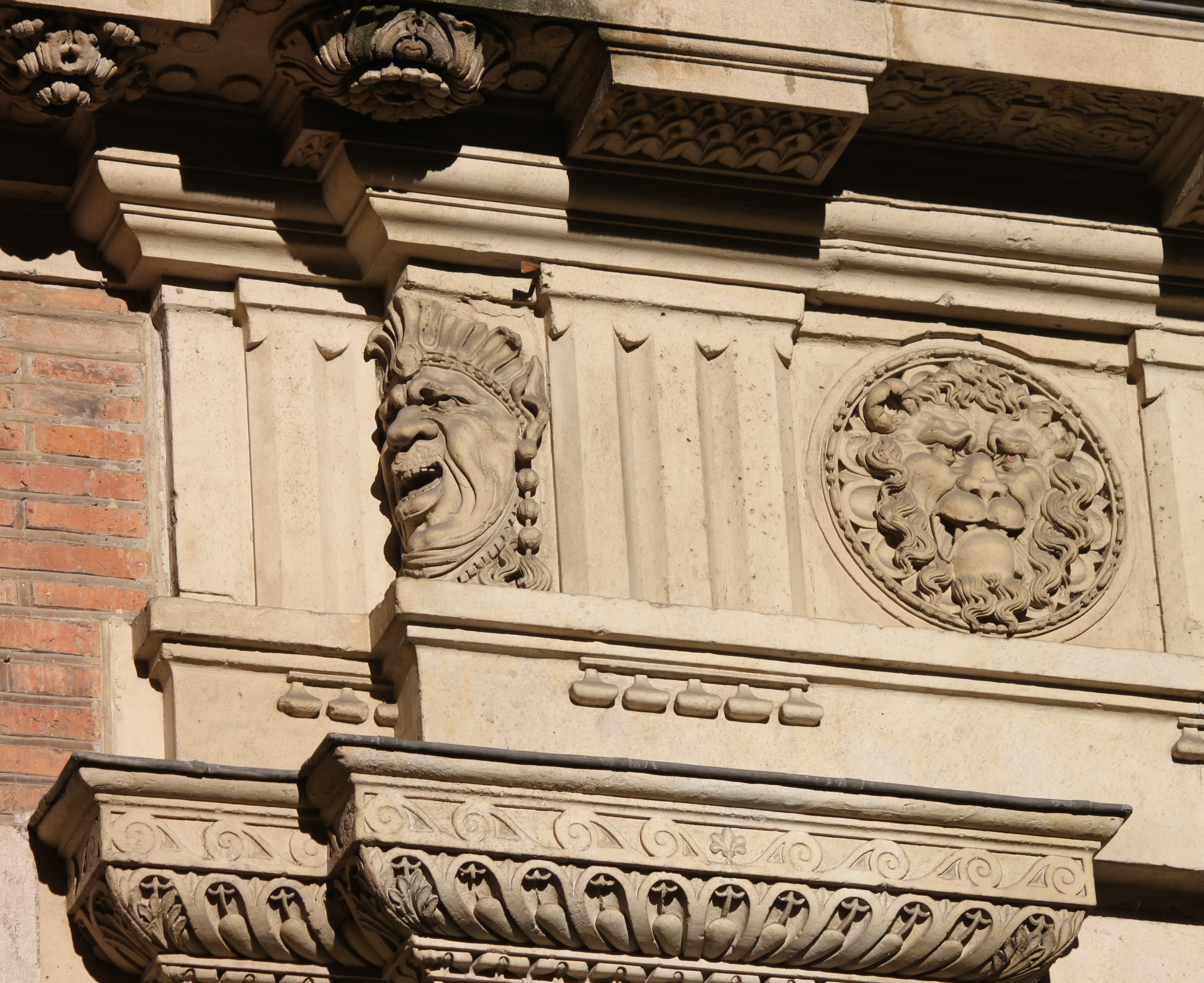
Hôtel d'Assézat: detail of the frieze of metopes.

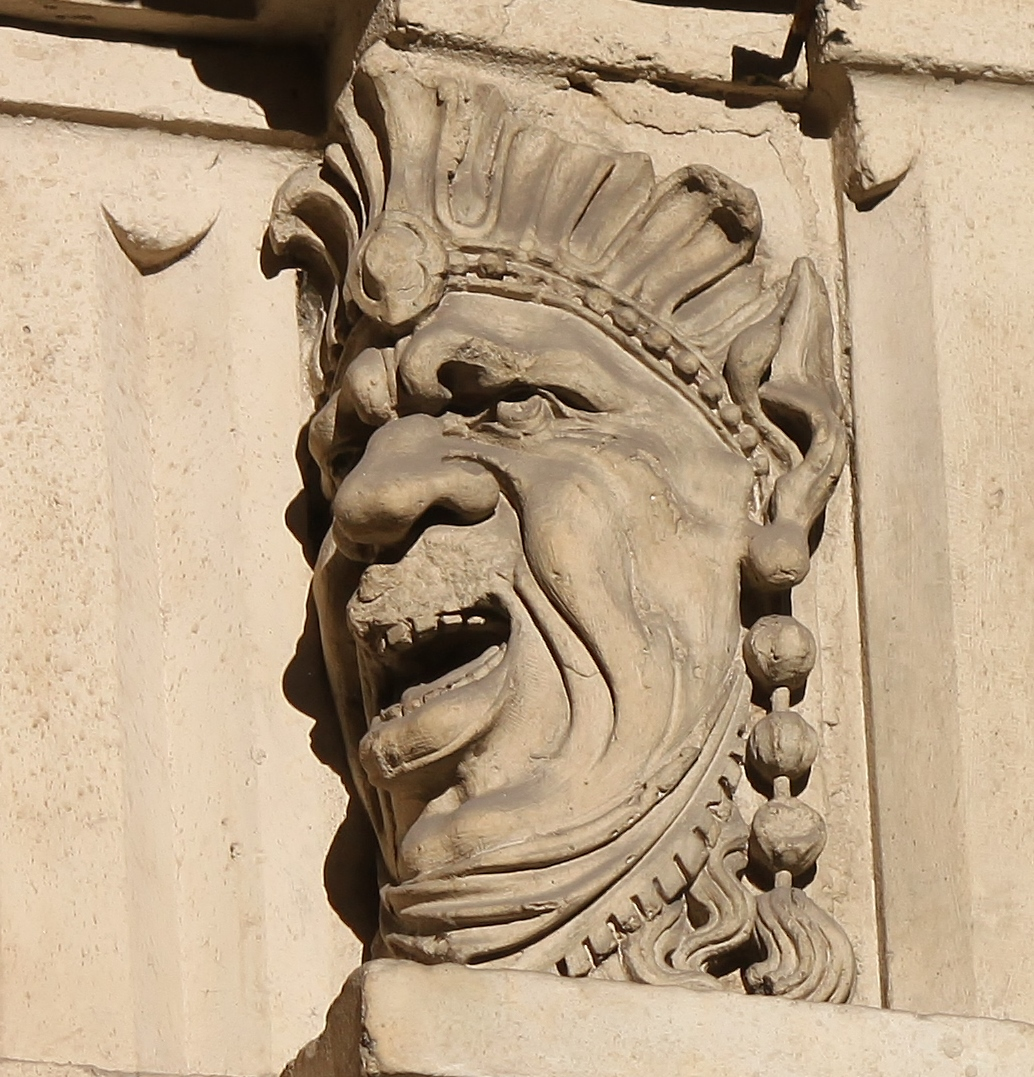
Hôtel d'Assézat: head of Amerindian.

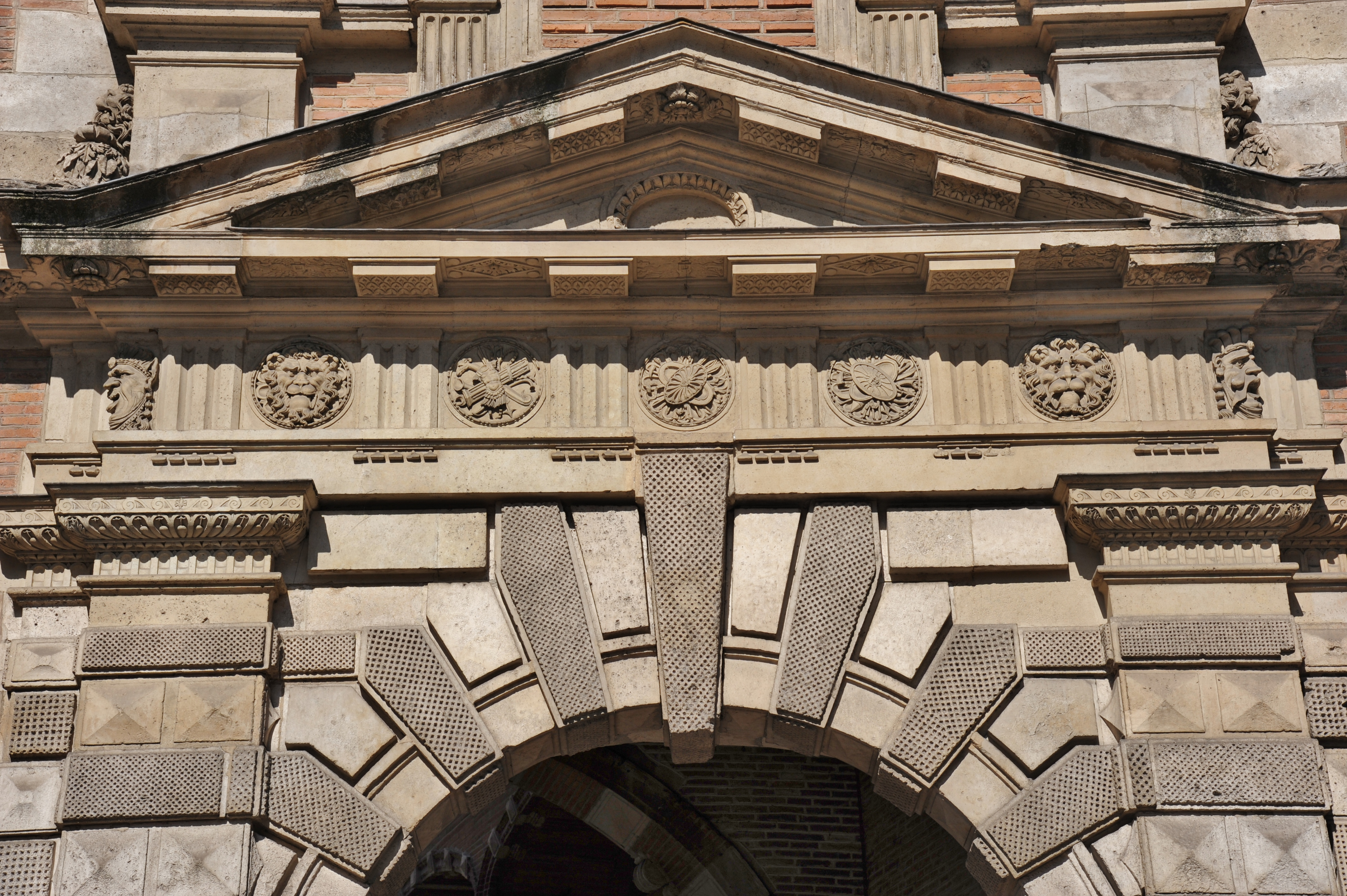
Hôtel d'Assézat: frieze of metopes.

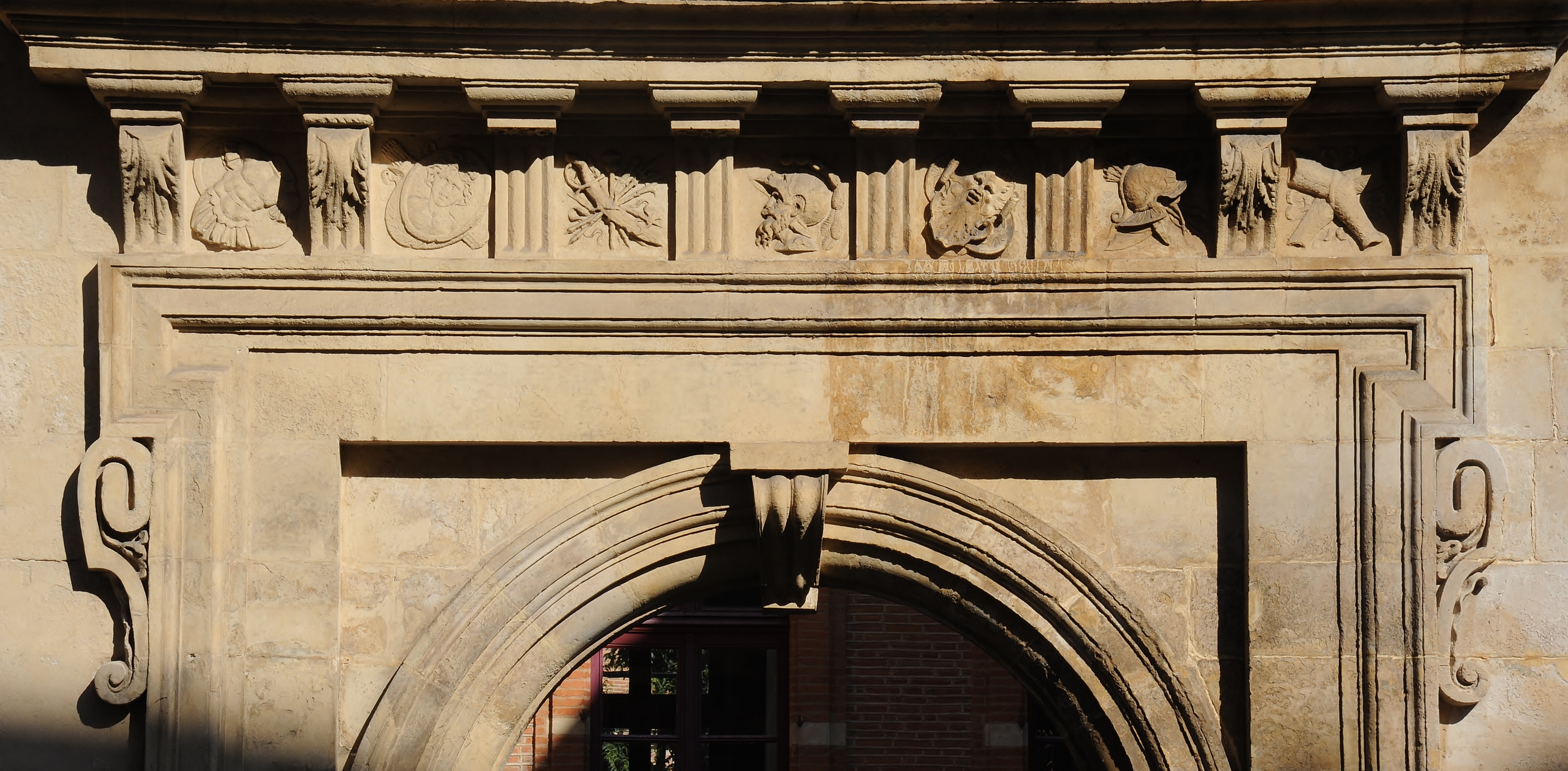
Hôtel du Vieux-Raisin: frieze of metopes.

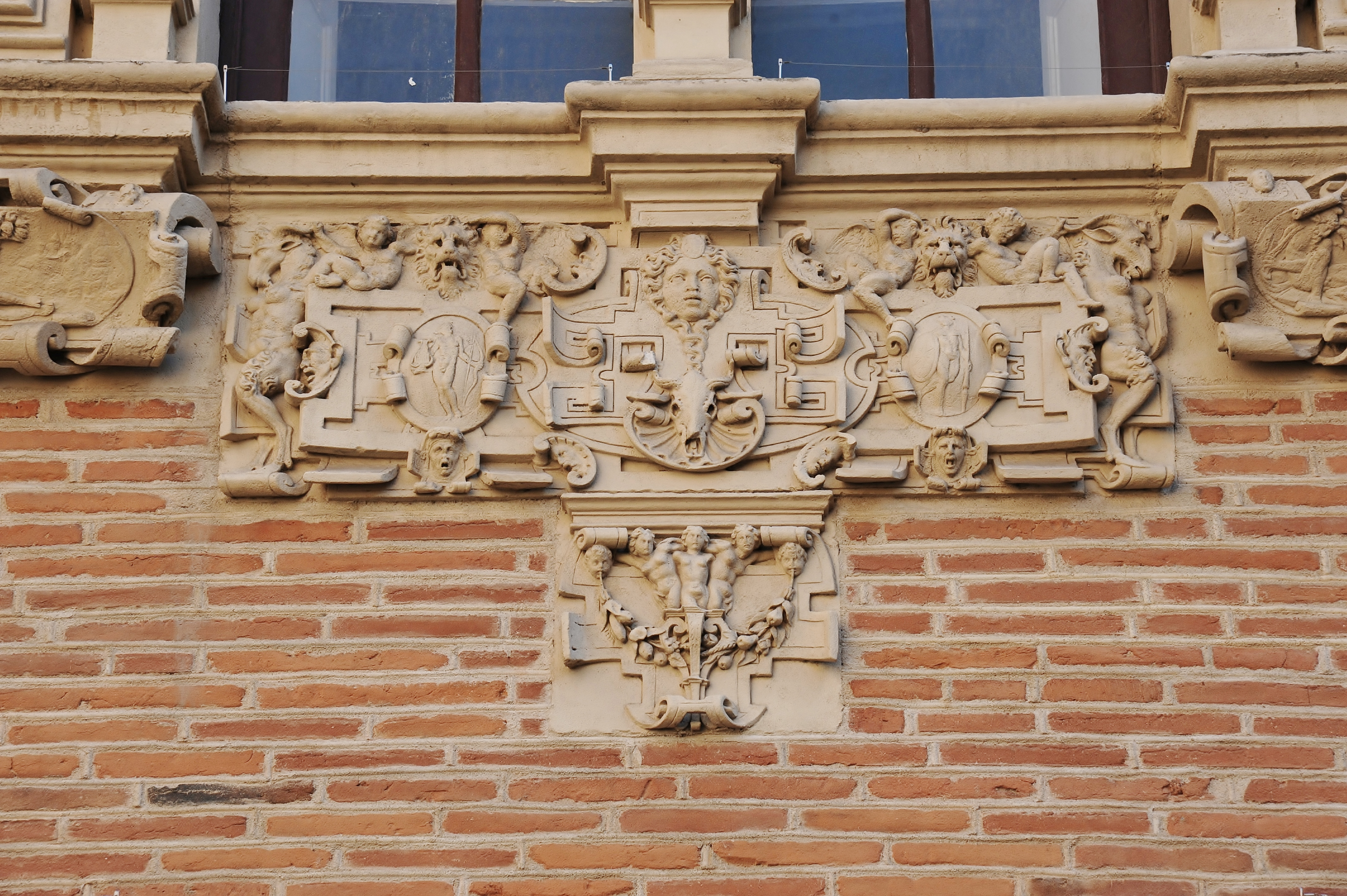
Hôtel du Vieux-Raisin.

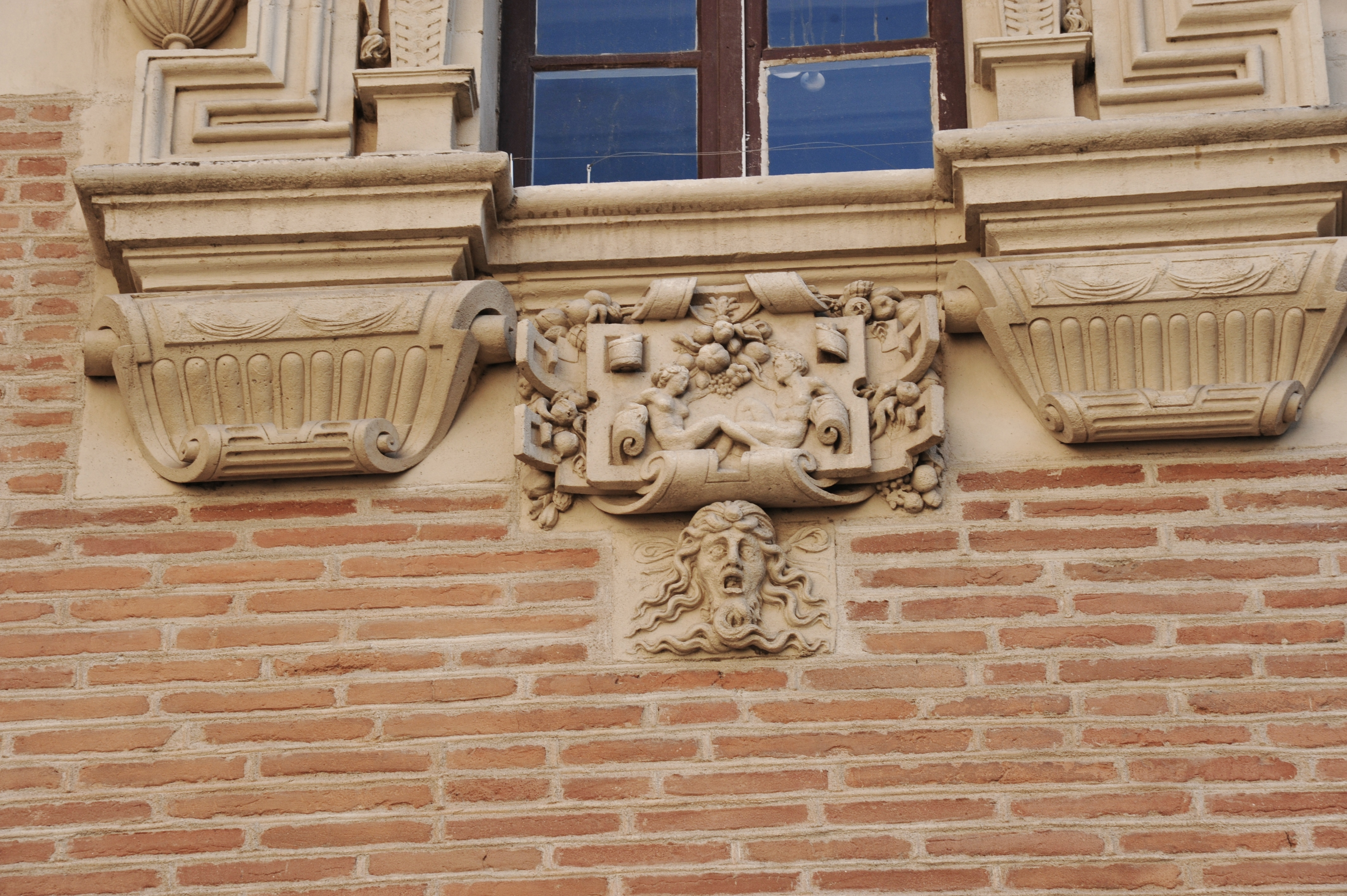
Hôtel du Vieux-Raisin.

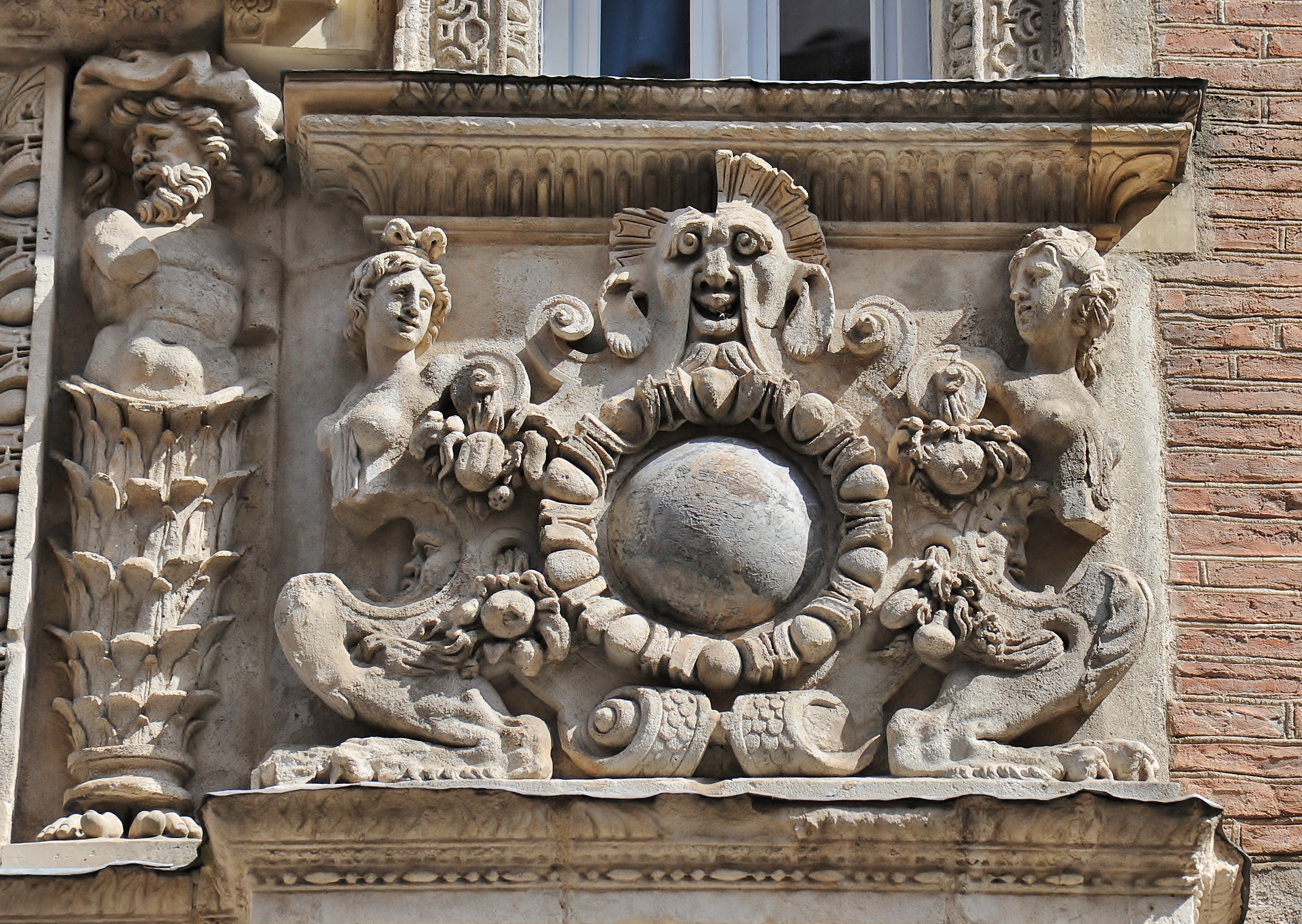
Hôtel Molinier.

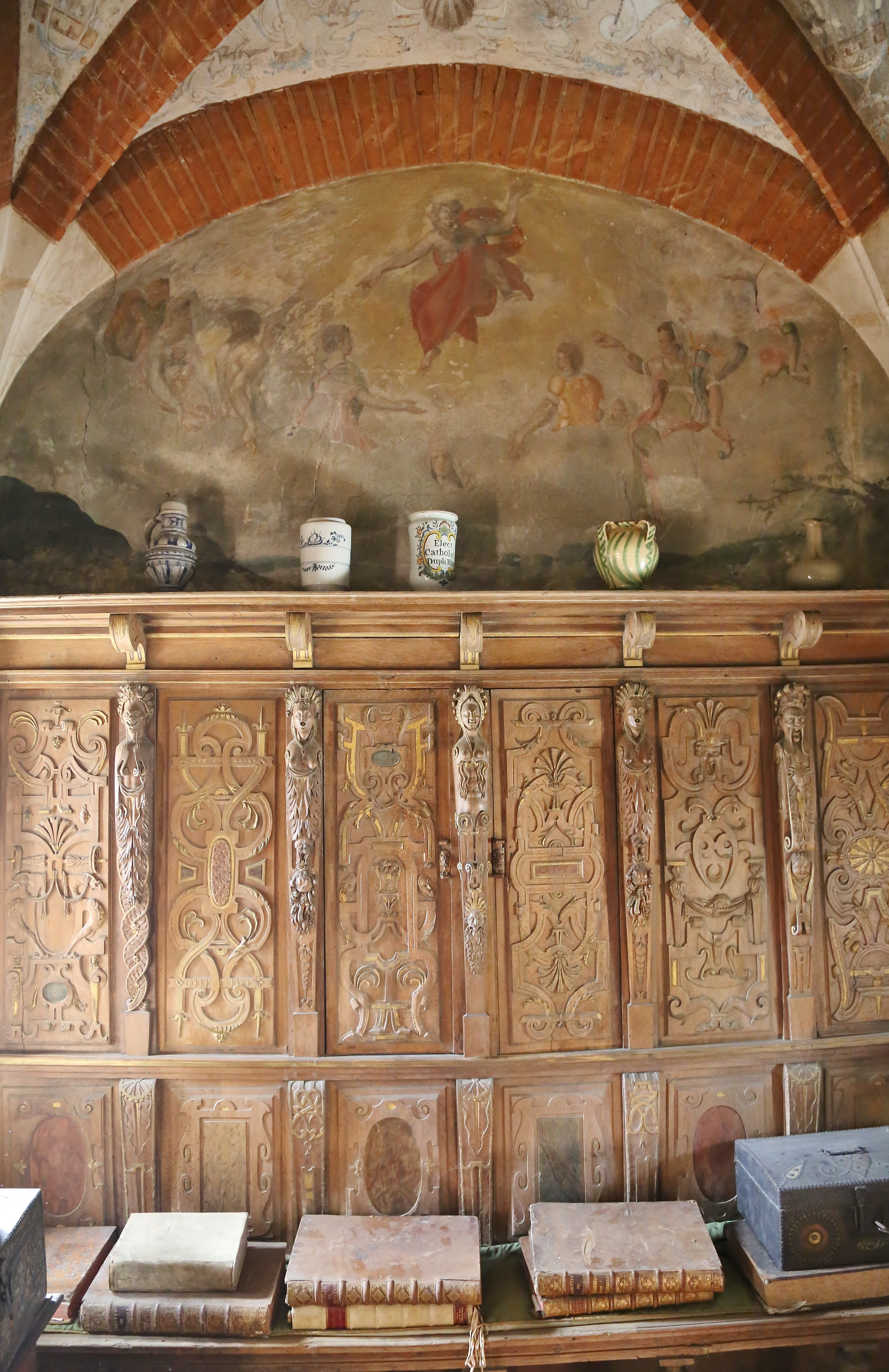
Quatrains' cabinet in the castle of Pibrac.

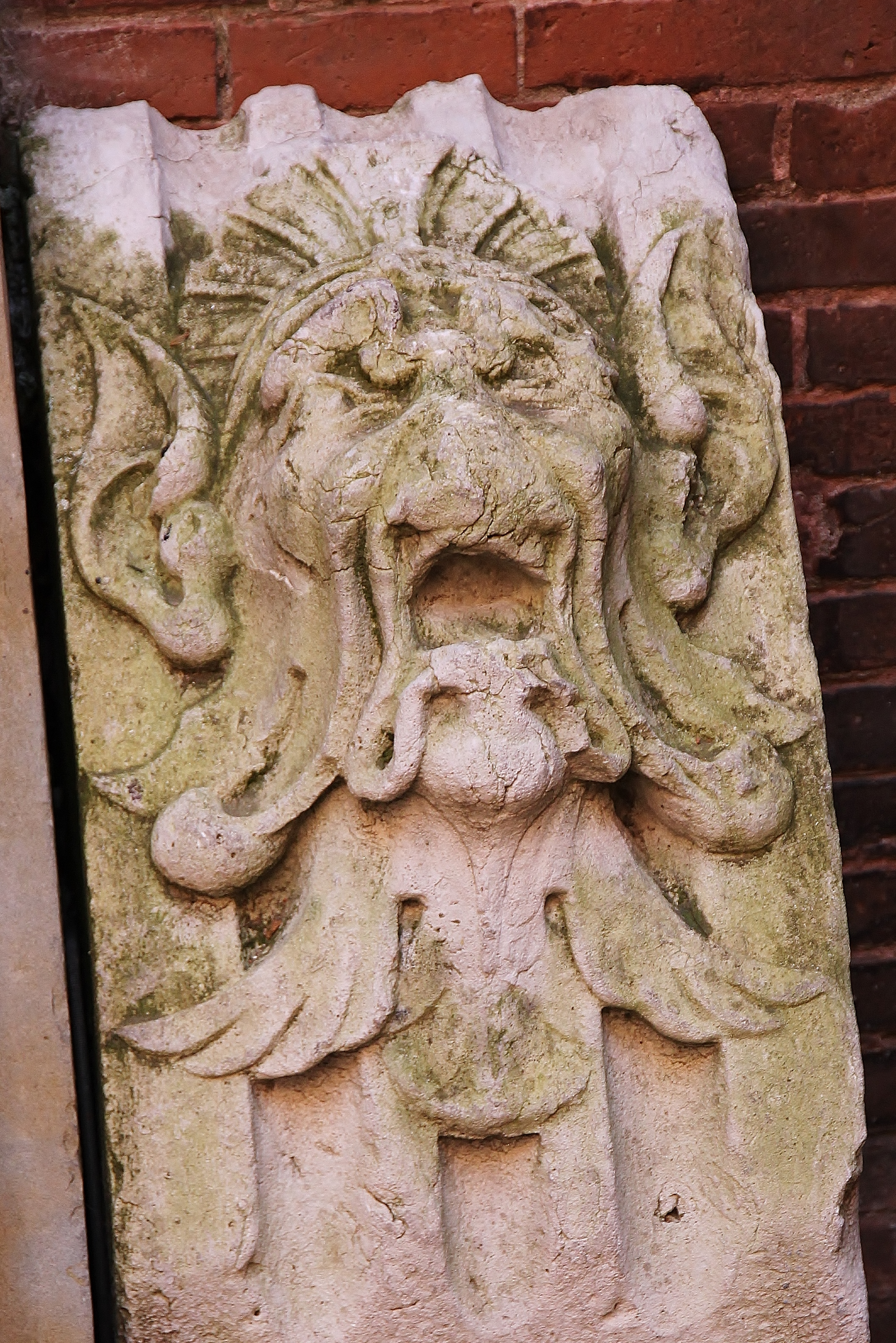
Hôtel de Massas.

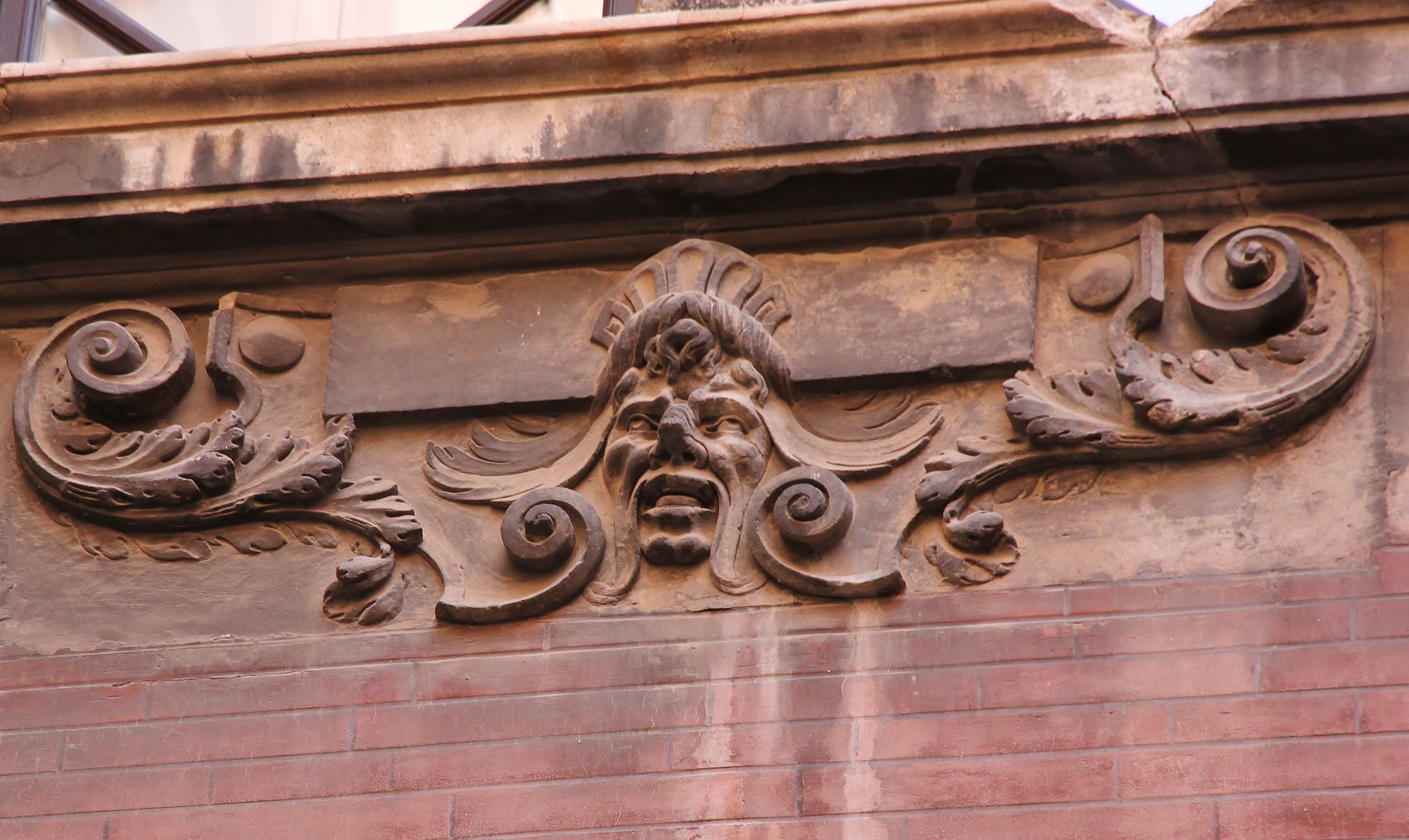
Hôtel de Massas.

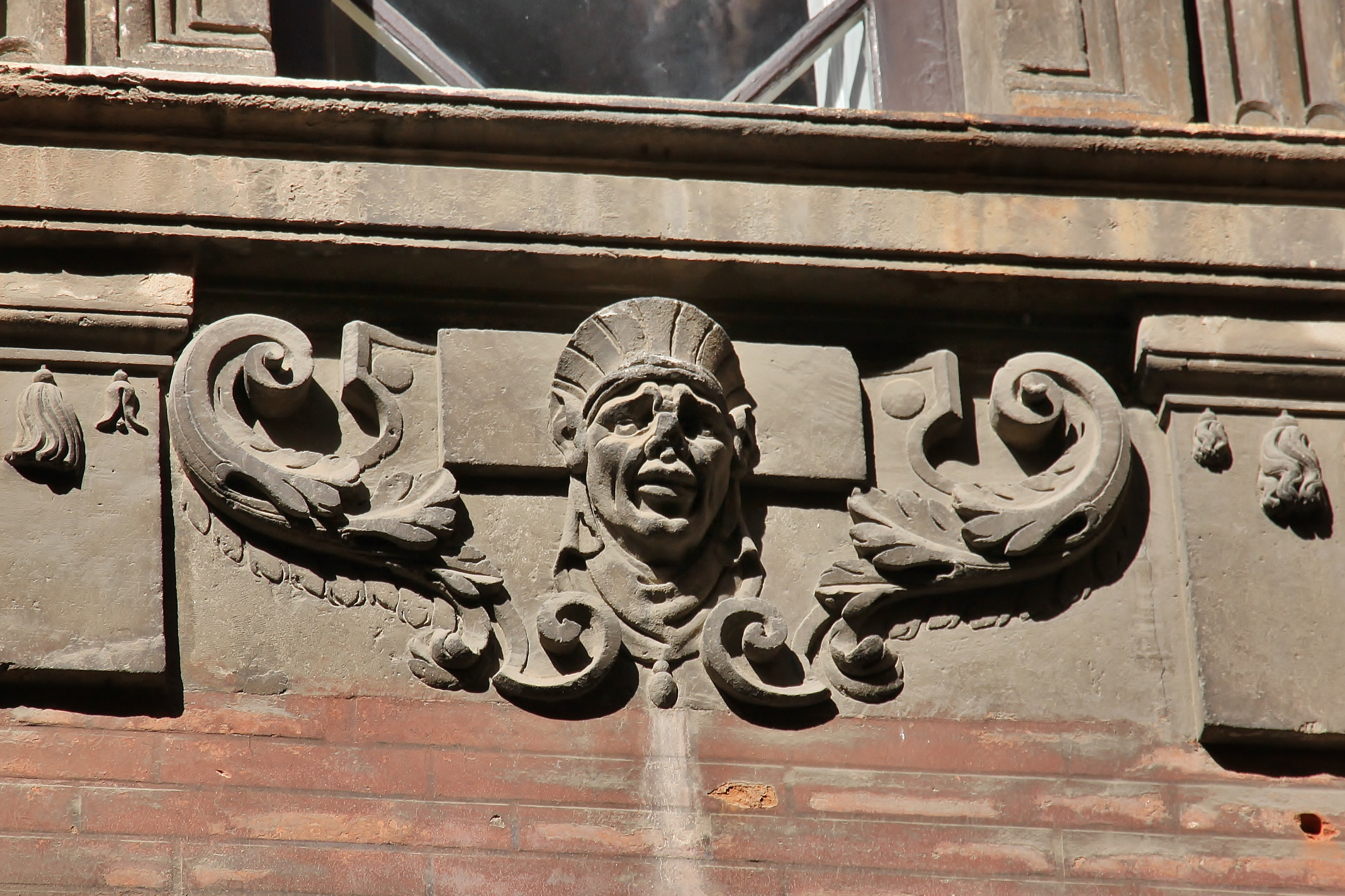
Hôtel de Massas.

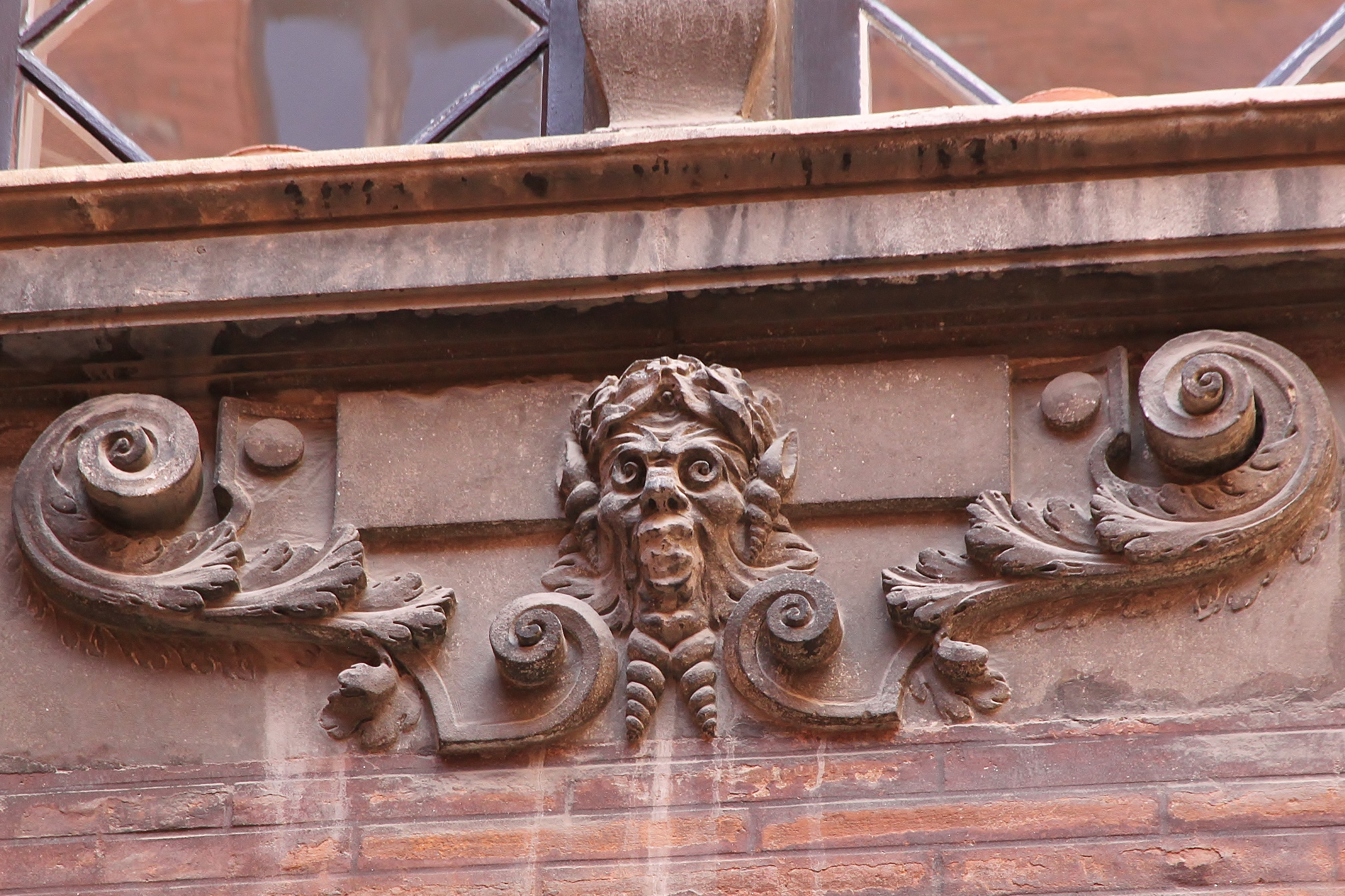
Hôtel de Massas.

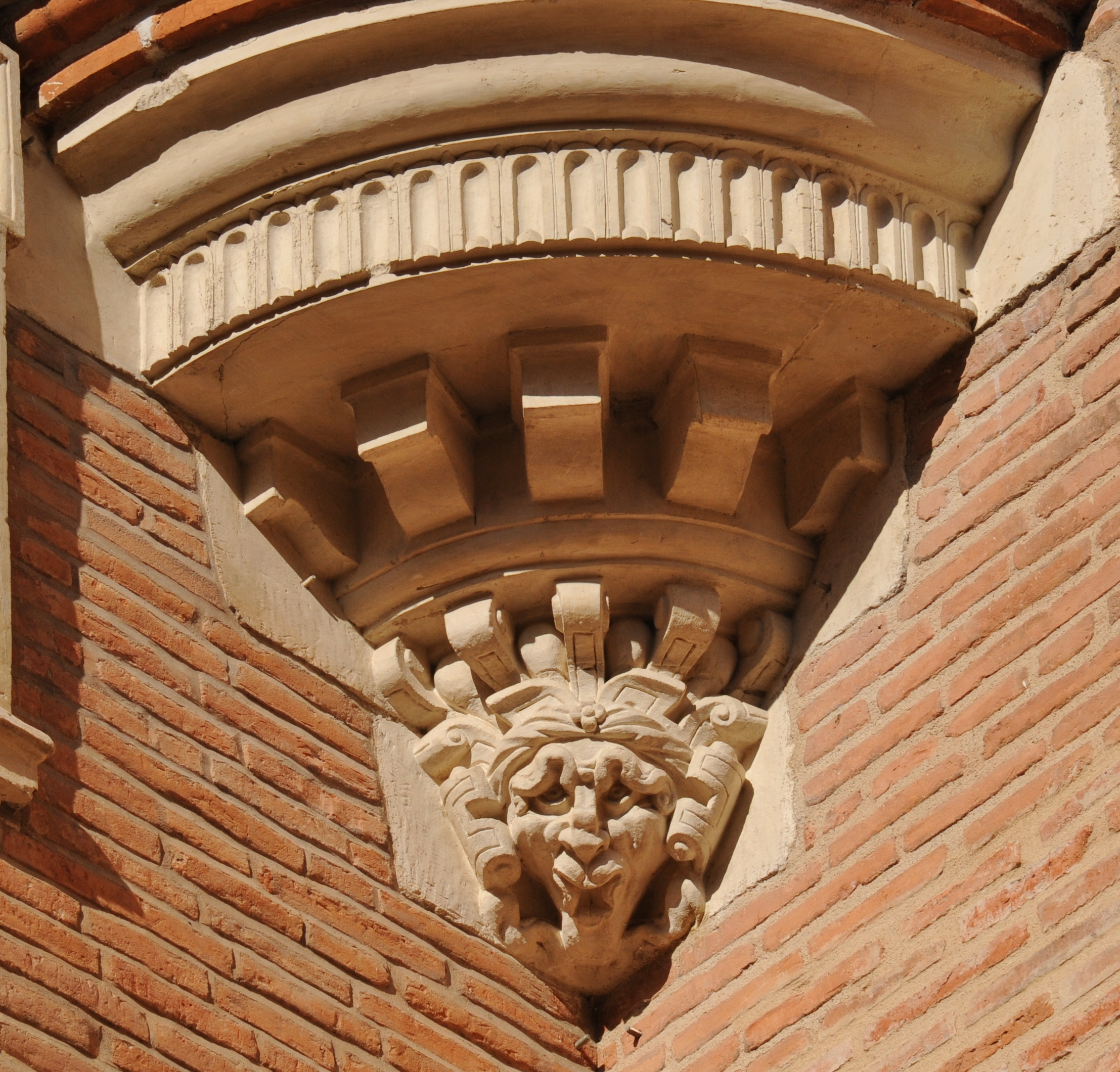
Hôtel Dumay.

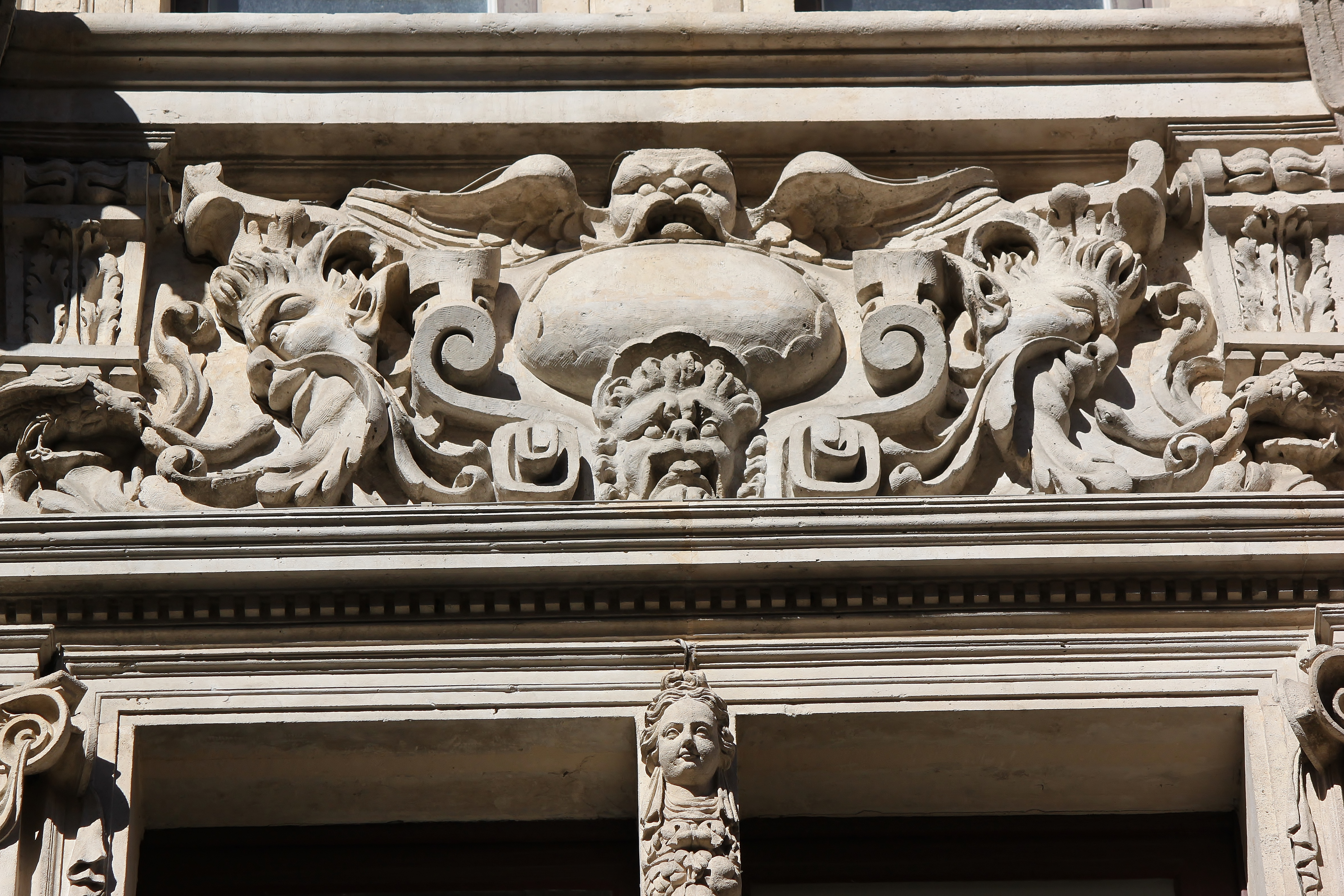
Hôtel de Clary.

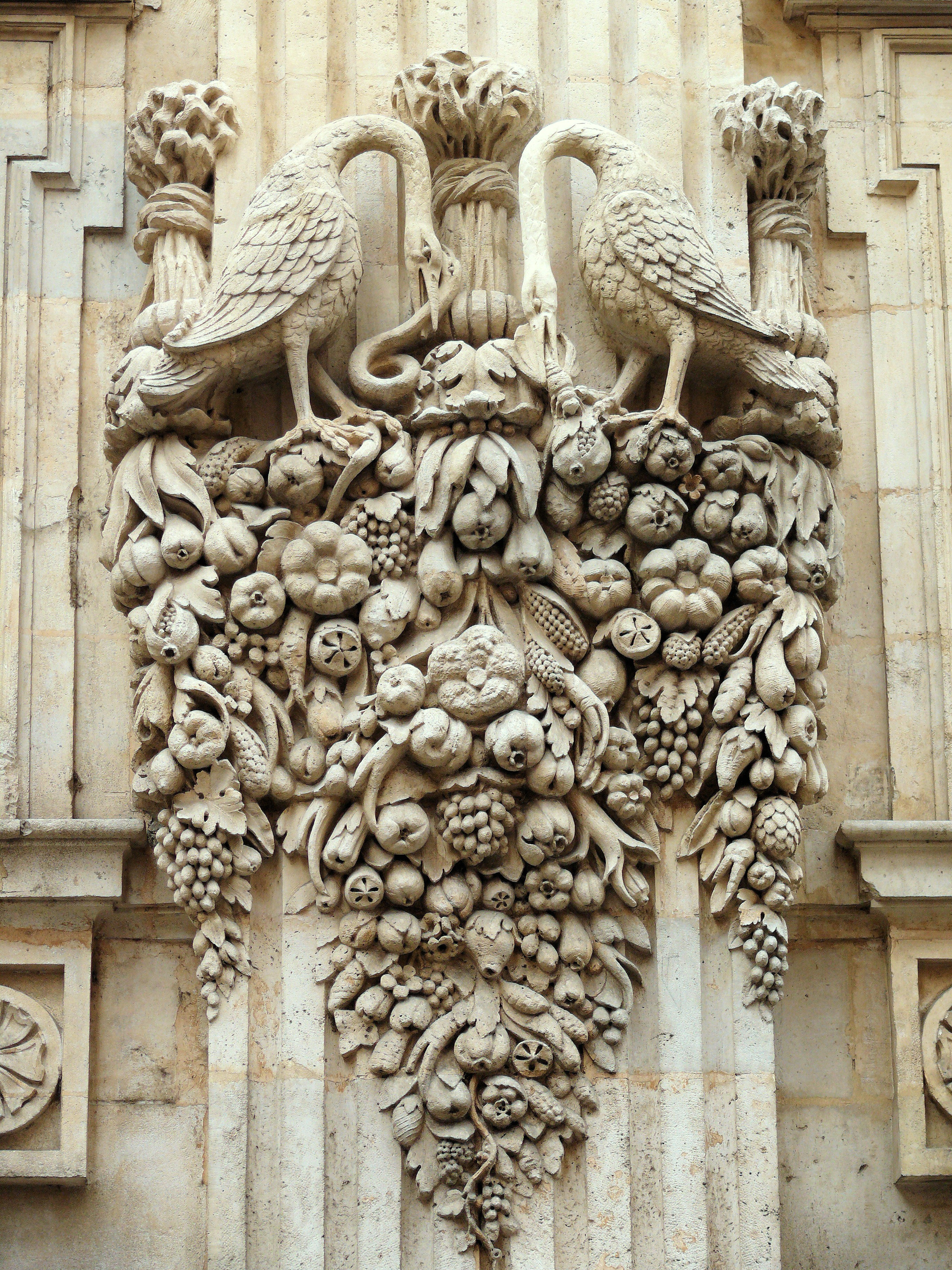
Hôtel de Clary.

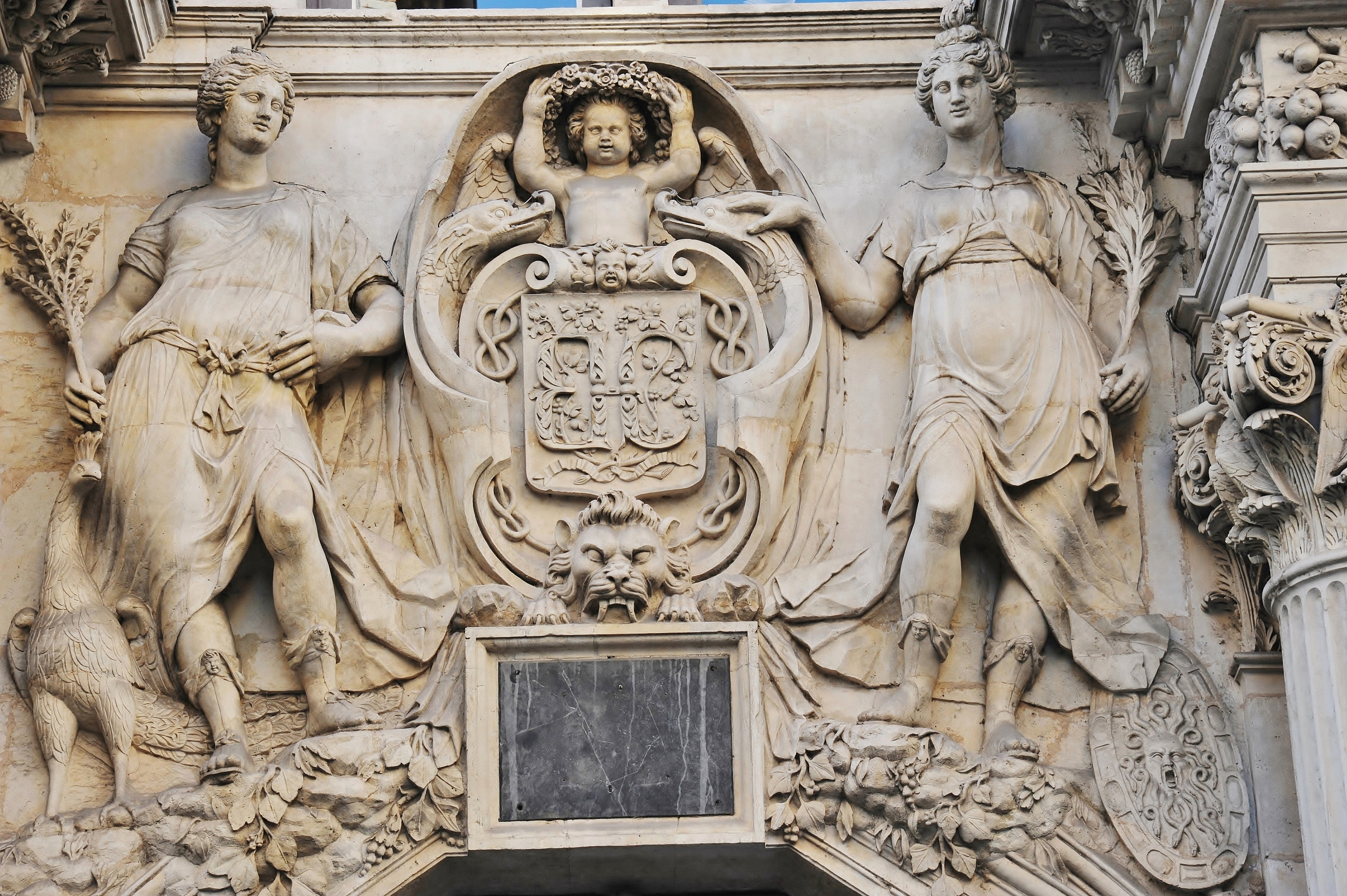
Hôtel de Clary: Juno and Minerva.

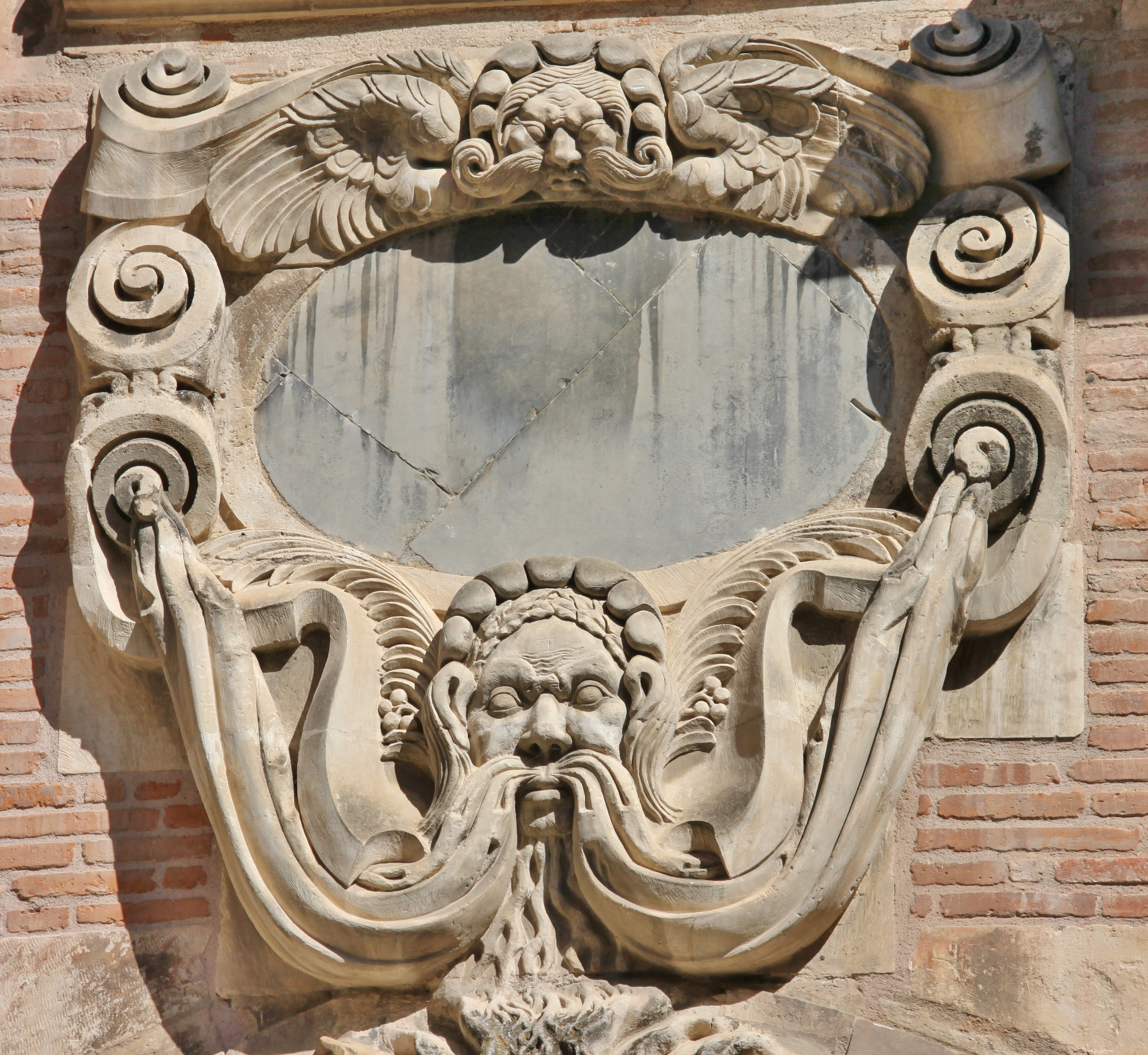
Hôtel de Clary.

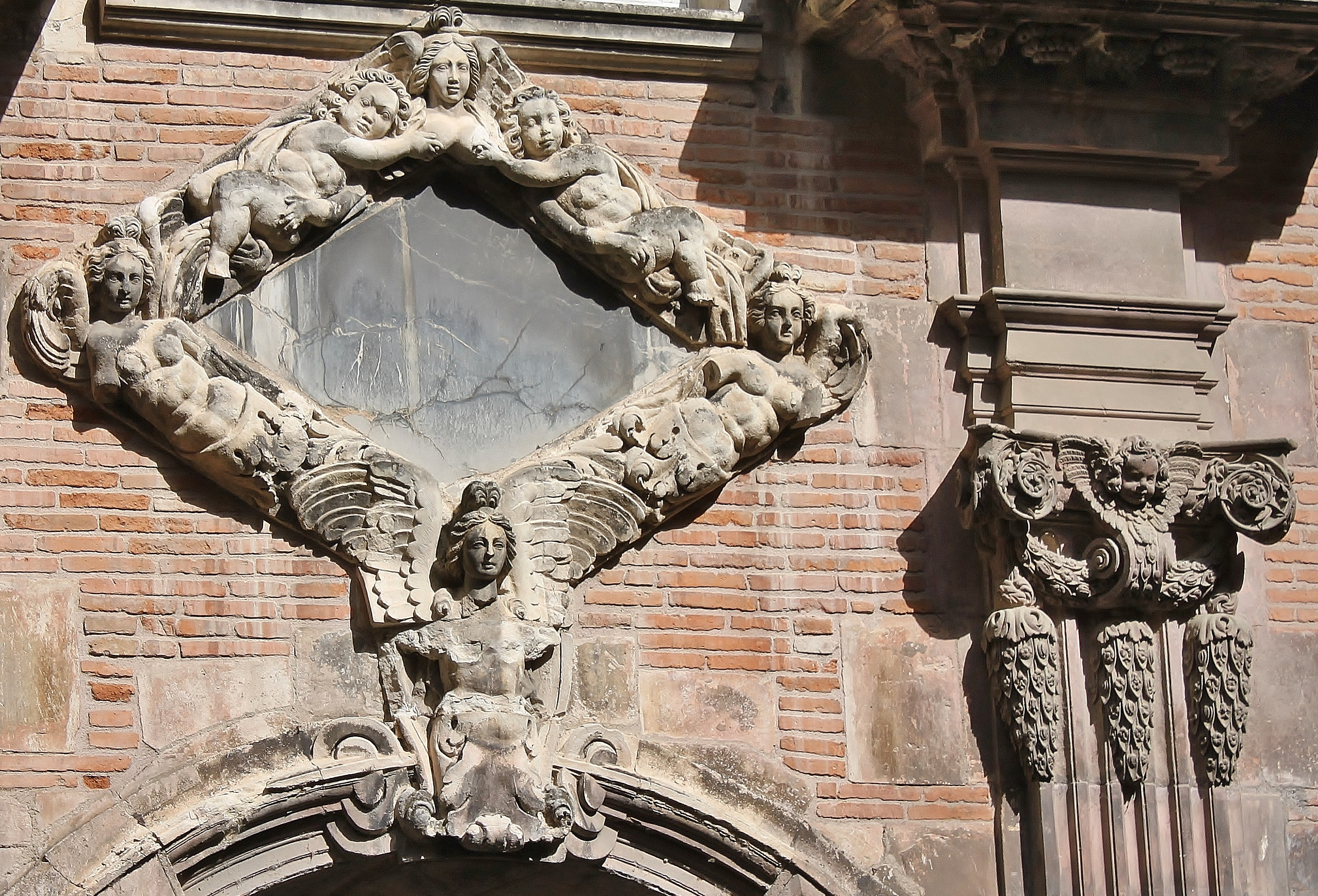
Hôtel de Clary.

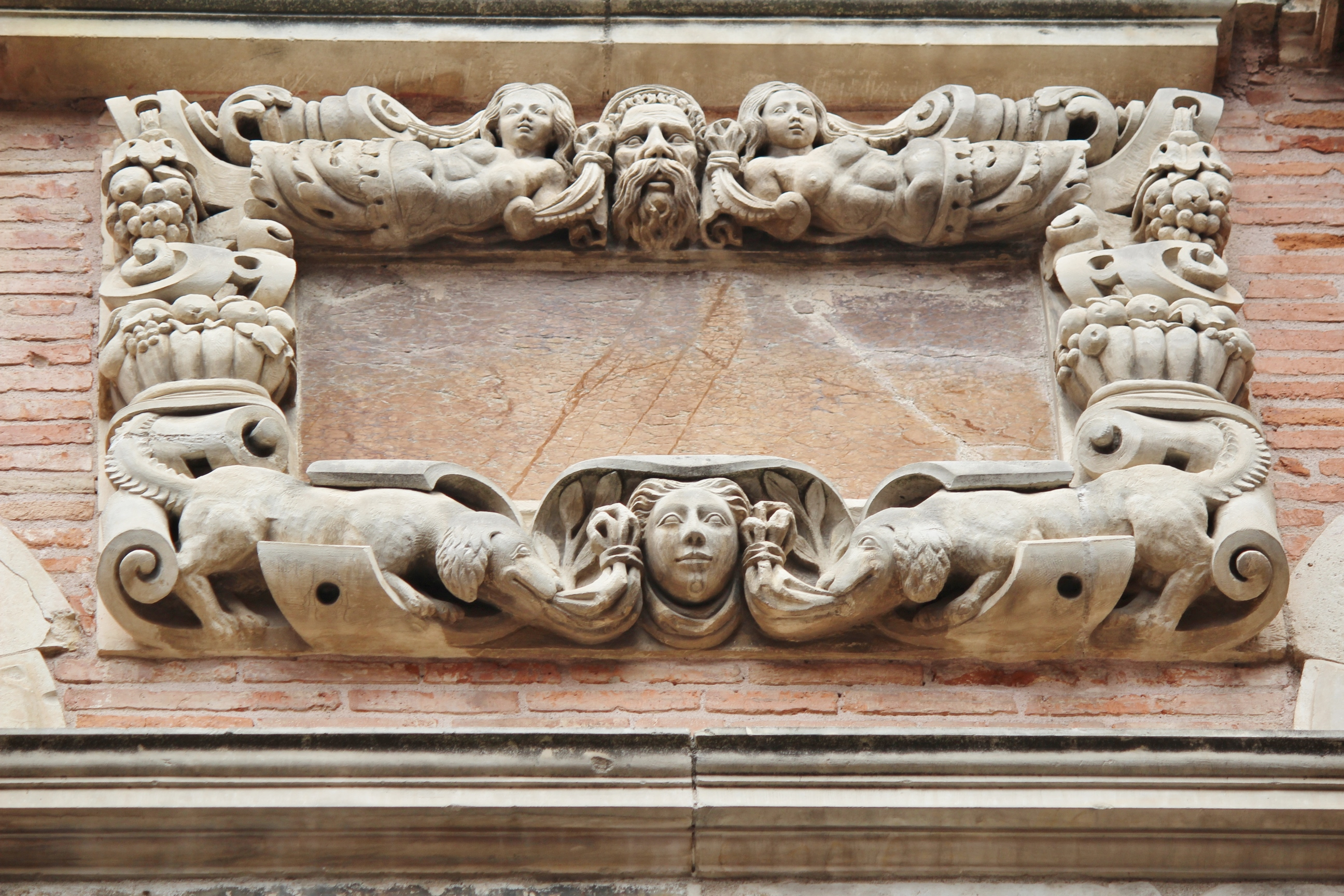
Hôtel de Clary.

== See also ==
- French Renaissance architecture
- Renaissance architecture

== Bibliography ==
- Collective work directed by Pascal Julien, «catalogue de l'exposition Toulouse Renaissance» (“catalogue of the Toulouse Renaissance exhibition”), Somogy éditions d'art, 2018.
