= Sculptures by Ligier Richier =

Ligier Richier Sculpture of 16th century

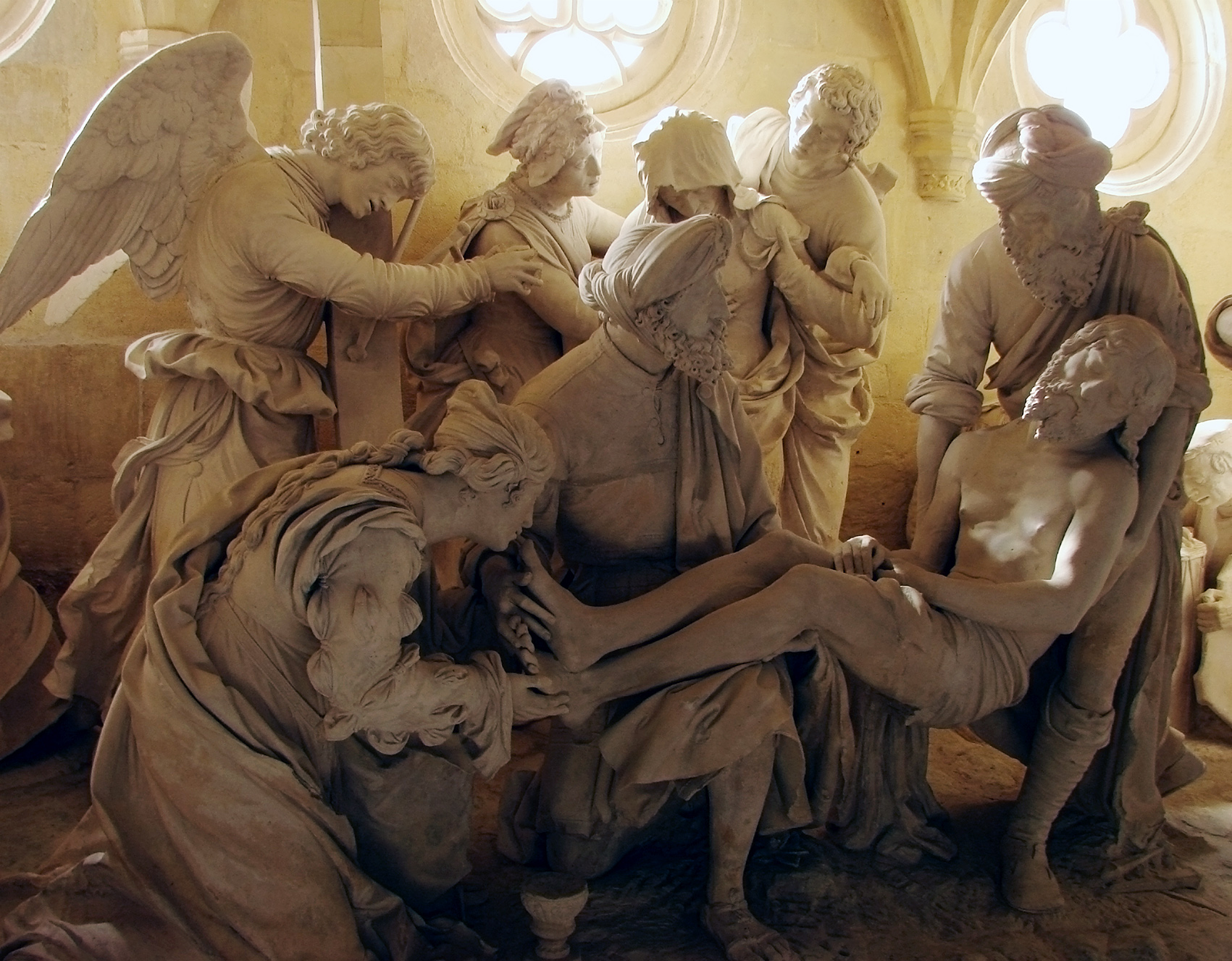
Ligier Richier's "Mise au Tombeau" in the church of Saint-Étienne, Saint-Mihiel, France. depicts Christ before he is placed in the tomb.

Ligier Richier was a 16th-century religious sculptor working in Lorraine, France and known in particular for his depictions of scenes from the "Passion of Christ". The various episodes of the Passion, between the arrest and the crucifixion of Christ, as recounted in the Gospels (Matthew 27, Luke 22, Mark 15, John 19), were increasingly subject to representation in the Arts towards the end of the Middle Ages, in tandem with the growing popularity of the staging of theatrical mystery plays.

Little is known of Ligier Richier's personal life as a consequence of the scarcity of records available. Thus attribution of works to him faces the same constraints and often relies on the scholarship of people such as Denis Paul, particularly his thesis "l’artiste et son œuvre" published in Paris and Nancy in 1911. A good example of the scarcity of information available is the extent to which researchers have relied on the writing of the Troyes pilgrim Chatourop, recorded through the writings of dom Calmet, for information on the works at Hunch back of Notre Dame in Bar-le-Duc and Saint Pierre in Saint Mihiel. Paul Denis rejects the idea that Richier travelled to Italy and had contact with Michelangelo.

== Altarpiece of the Ancienne Collégiale de Saint-Maur ==
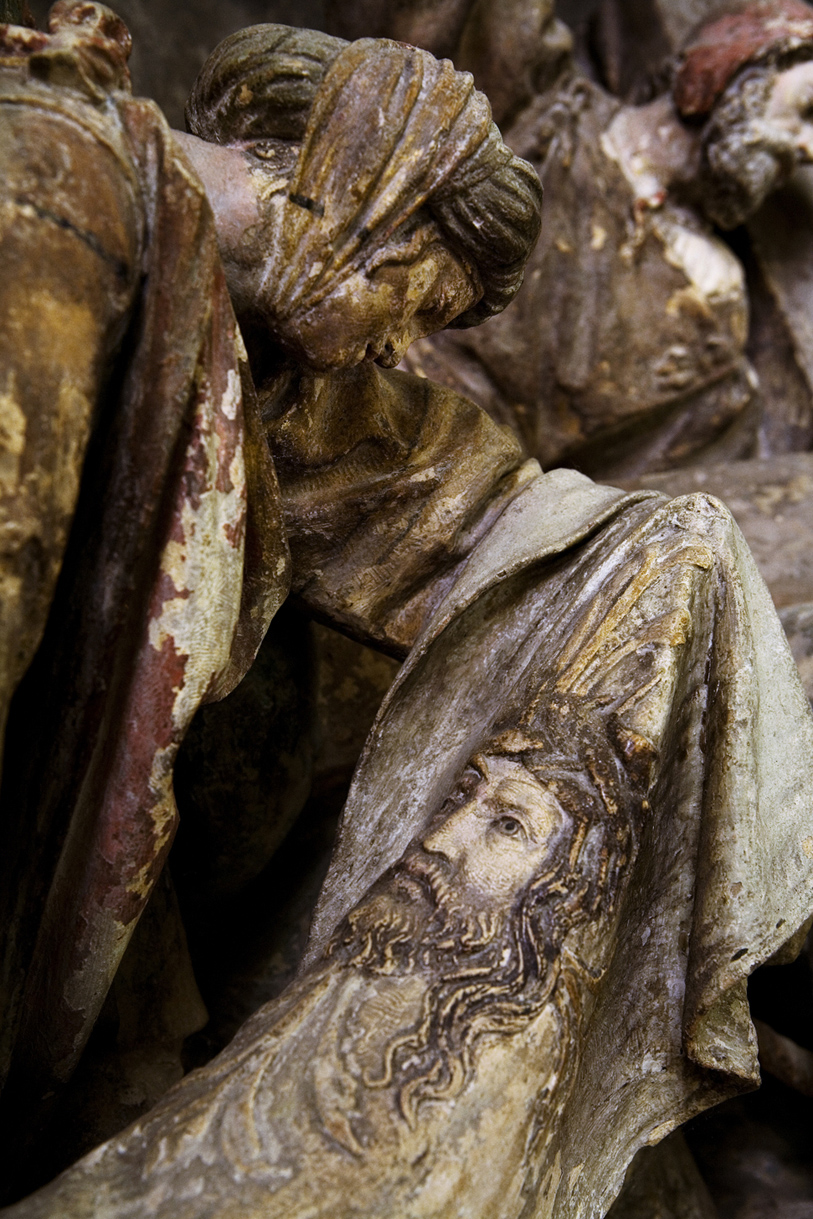
Veronica looks in amazement at the image of Christ on her veil. Photograph shown courtesy Clément Guillaume, all rights reserved

This work by Ligier Richier is located in the Église collégiale de Saint-Maur (St Martin) and is generally thought to have been carved in 1523. It is the earliest work that has been attributed to Ligier Richier. Hattonchâtel is a village in the canton of Vigneulles, 18 kilometres from Saint-Mihiel and is situated at the top of one of the range of hills which run from Verdun to Toul and separate the valley of the Meuse from the Woëvre plain. The village took its name from a castle built in the 9th century by Hatton, the Bishop of Verdun at the time.

Richier's retable or altarpiece is divided into three distinct sections or niches which are separated by four upright pillars. The central section is constructed to form an arch and is higher than the sections to the right and left. Within each of these three niches, Richier has carved compositions in high relief whilst the pillars, arch and the rest of the retable feature elaborate carvings and embellishments which include the tools of the architect and the sculptor; a ruler and a compass and a hammer and chisel. The three high reliefs depict three episodes from the Passion.

The first of these episodes is a scene showing Christ carrying the Cross on his way to Calvary or Golgotha. Christ is shown in the centre of the composition dressed in a long flowing robe and weakened by the flogging from one of the "executioners", whose task was to perform the crucifixion, and the suffering of the previous hours with the flagellation he had endured, he is unable to bear the heavy weight of the cross and has fallen to the ground. His face is etched with anxiety and "une intraduisible expression de souffrance résignée". In the scene and just behind Christ, Richier depicts the figure of Simon the Cyrenian, who will soon be coerced into helping Jesus to support the Cross. Three women are shown on the left of the scene, including Veronica who looks adoringly at Christ's image on her veil. Two executioners complete the scene, one of whom is raising a stick and is about to beat Jesus with it, urging him to stand up and move forward, whilst the other appears to partially support the Cross but is no doubt telling Jesus to get on his feet.

In the central niche is a depiction of the crucifixion itself and to the left of his composition, Richier includes a scene much favoured at the time by gothic "imagiers"; the Virgin Mary having a fainting fit, overcome by emotion, and needing physical support from St John (the "Pâmoison" or "Spasimo"). Elsewhere in what is a complex composition, Richier includes three men on horseback, Mary Magdalene and a man holding a pole at the end of which is a sponge. One of the horsemen has just pierced Jesus' side with his lance and Jesus' blood has splashed onto him and another holds a banner on which is written "Vere hic homo filius Dei erat" ("here is a man who is truly the son of God").

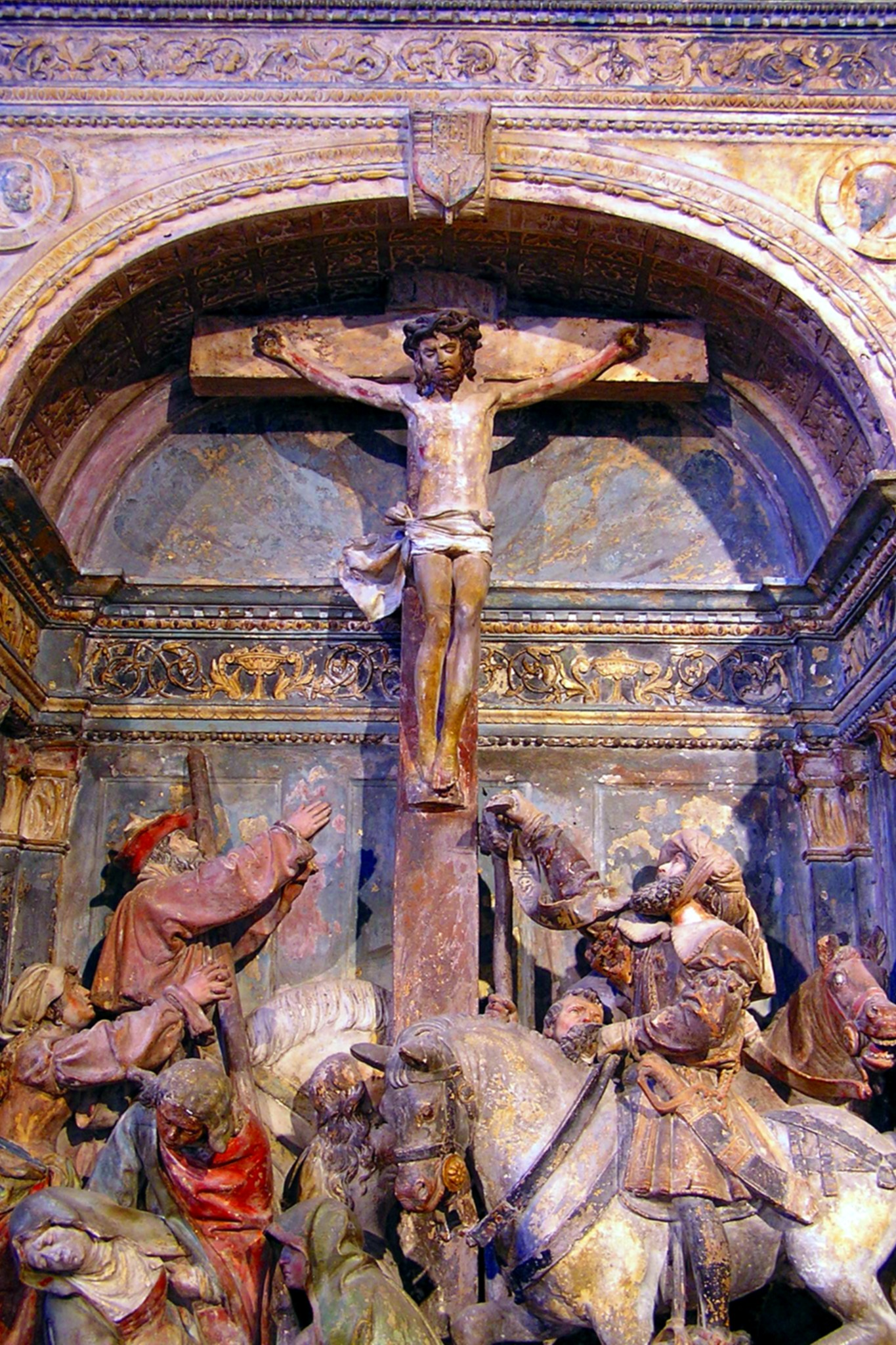
The central part of the Hattonchâtel altarpiece

In the third scene we see Jesus being attended to by various people after he has been taken down from the Cross. He is shown lying on the ground and supported by the Virgin Mary and St. John. Mary Magdalene and another woman are present, and to the rear Richier includes a bishop who holds a heavy cross in his left hand whilst a priest kneels at his feet (see below for the probable identity of the bishop and priest),

The dimensions of the piece are 2.60 metres in length and 1.60 metres in height. The central niche is 0.88 metres wide by 1.20 metres in height and the other niches measure 0.64 metres by 0.70 metres. Along the base of the altarpiece is the inscription taken from St Peter.

"XPS (Christus) PASSUS EST PRO NOBIS. OBIS RELINQUENS EXEMPLUM VT SEQUAMINI VESTIGIA EIVS"

At the base of each pillar is the date "L'AN. 1000. 500. 23".

During the 1914-1918 war, the German Army transferred the retable to the "Chapelle des Templiers" in Metz. This was after a bomb had fallen on the church although the retable was not damaged. No doubt the Germans were anxious to avoid the retable being damaged should the church have been hit again.

Casts of this work can be seen in the Musée de sculpture comparée in the Palais du Trocadero in Paris and the Musée Ligier-Richier in Saint-Mihiel.

== The Calvary at Génicourt ==
This is considered to be Richier's first Calvary and Paul Denis wrote that "Parmi le groupe assez important des calvaires pouvant être rattachés à l'atelier, celui de Génicourt nous paraît devoir être regardé comme le premier en date. La très intéressante église de ce village, situé à mi-chemin entre Saint-Mihiel et Verdun, renferme en effet un Christ en croix et deux statues de bois polychrome, la Vierge et saint Jean".

The Génicourt work is thought to have been executed shortly after the retable at Hattonchâtel. The work is in polychromed wood and comprises a depiction of Jesus Christ on the Cross with the two robbers on either side and depictions of the Virgin Mary and St John. Originally all the works were located by the church's sanctuary but are not currently kept together but located in various positions around the church. Interesting to read Paul Denis on the subject of the location of such a work in relation to liturgical rules-

"Ces statues, placées sur le tref, pièce de bois horizontale posée en travers et à peu près à mi-hautcur de la grande arcade du sanctuaire ('), formaient jadis un groupe complet, dont les régies liturgiques prescrivaient l'érection à cet endroit. Il offrait aux méditations des fidèles, sous une forme sensible et matérielle, l'image du sacrifice sanglant du Calvaire, dont le sacrifice de la messe, célébré sous leurs yeux, n'est, d'après le dogme catholique, que le renouvellement et la continuation journalière. Chaque église autrefois avait un tref de ce genre"

Génicourt is located in the canton and arrondissement of Verdun in the Meuse. The brochure issued by the Meuse Tourist Office on the Génicourt work is interesting and concentrates on the statue of the Virgin Mary. They write

"Everything in the beautiful church in Génicourt-sur-Meuse, the architecture, the furnishings, the stained glass, and all the painted decor.....give a very accurate idea of a rich parish church at the time of Ligier Richier"

They also add that "For many years considered to be a work by the young Richier, the Génicourt Calvary is now attributed to a "Master of Génicourt", probably close to Richier, a sculptor of his generation and possibly familiar with the work of his workshop, but with lesser skills and aesthetic mastery."

Despite the Tourist Board's comments the consensus of researcher's opinions seems to be that this is a Richier work. The brochure continues "...it is perhaps more significant to note the sense of tension and pathos, the way in which the Virgin's tapering fingers are intertwined making them as expressive as Her face; this is no longer popular art. Her mouth suggests a gentle movement similar to that to be seen on the Holy Woman in Clermont-en-Argonne and Mary Magdalene in Briey." The brochure also includes a quotation from Bernard Noël; "The Lady of Génicourt does not play a role defined by convention. She is just an ordinary woman who is deeply distressed."

When dealing with the depiction of Christ, Paul Denis draws attention to the similarities with the works at Hattonchâtel, Briey and Bar-le-Duc.{"Il offre des affinités incontestables avec celui que nous avons vu au centre de la scène principale du retable d'Hattonchâtel et ceux que nous rencontrerons par la suite à Bar-le-Duc,à Briey et ailleurs encore." Denis also notes that Jesus' Cross in the Génicourt Calvary has a large "titulus" attached to it and that the inclusion of this "titulus" was unusual for Richier's work.

=== Calvary at Saint-Gengoult ===
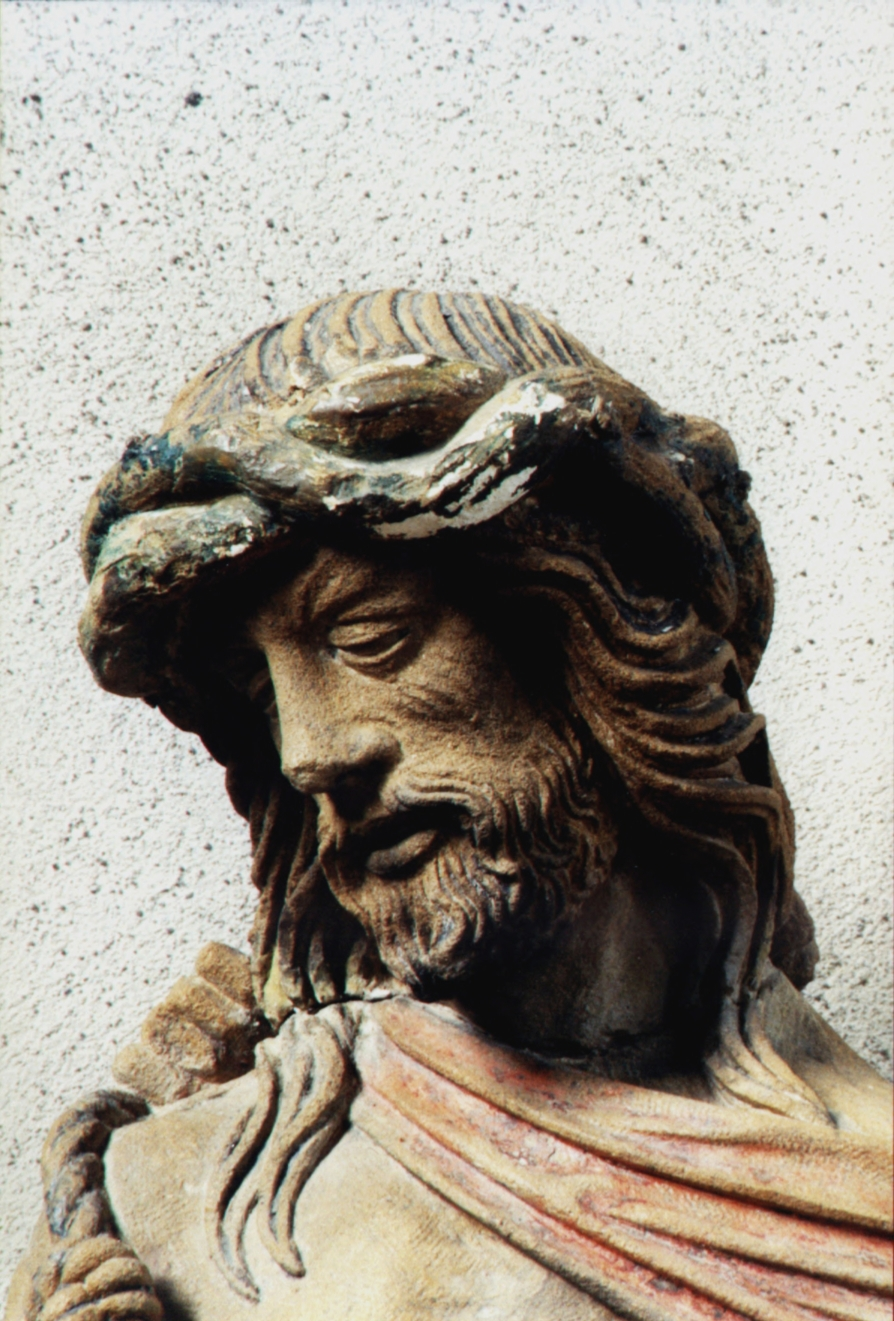
Head of Jesus. Part of the Calvary in St.Gengoult Church in Briey. Photograph shown courtesy Groening

The Romanesque church of Saint-Gengoult in Briey dates back to the beginning of the 12th century and holds a Ligier Richier calvary with life size depictions of Christ on the Cross, with the two robbers on either side. The Briey composition features Jesus on the central cross with the good sinner on one side and the bad sinner on the other. Richier adds to his composition the figures of the Virgin Mary, Mary Magdalene and St John. The work is thought to date to 1534 and was originally made by Richier for the Oratory of Jean Milet which was located in the old Briey cemetery. Jean Milet was a native of Briey and the vicar of La Chaussée. The oratory was destroyed in 1868 and the Calvary finally moved to the church in 1947 after a period when it was kept in a chapel in the new Briey cemetery. This chapel in the new cemetery was where the priests of the parish were buried.

Some photographs of the Briey Calvary can be seen in the Bridgeman Art Library website and a close-up of the head of Jesus, shown courtesy of Groening. appears above.

As was the case with the Calvary at Bar-le-Duc, the good and bad robbers hang from T-shaped structures and are tied rather than nailed to these structures and again both are shown in contorted positions.

=== The Calvary in the church of Notre-Dame in Bar-le-Duc ===
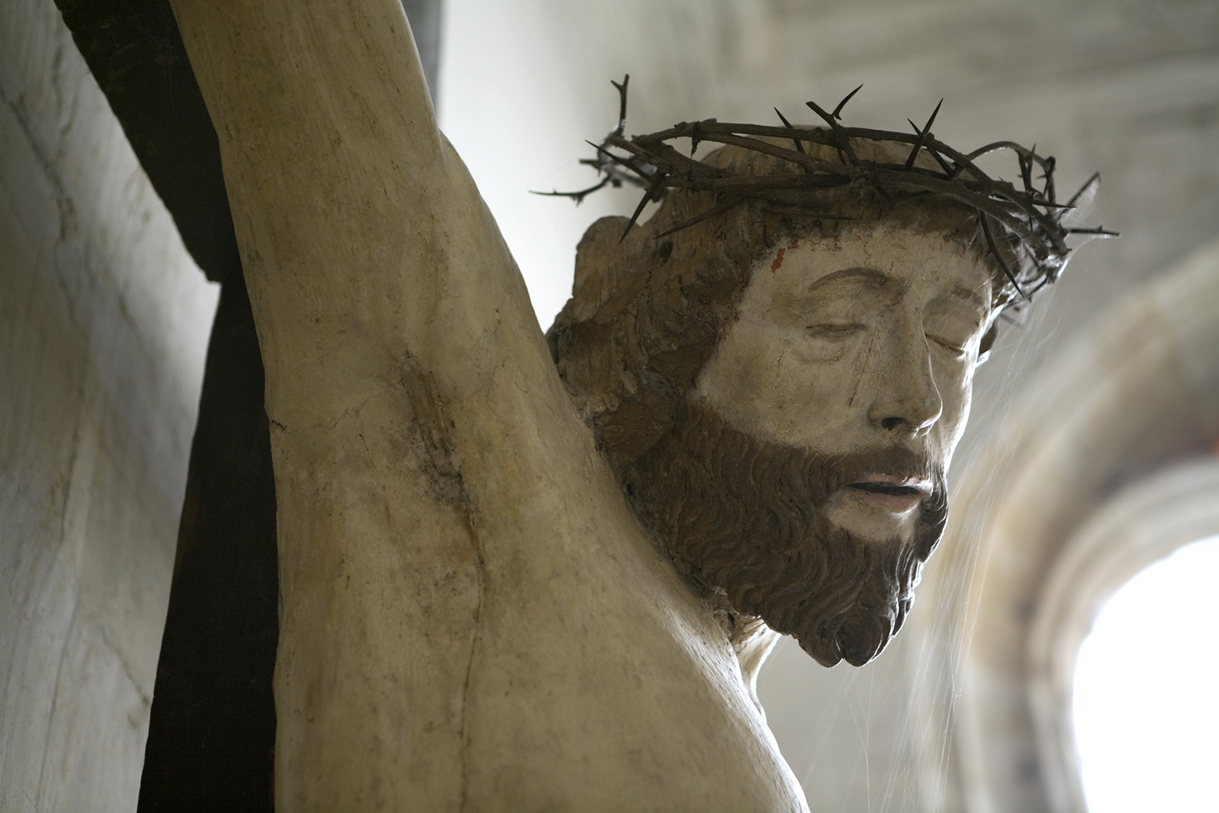
The head of Christ. Crucifix in Notre Dame church Bar-le-Duc. Photograph courtesy of Clément Guillaume

There is evidence that there was at one time a sculptured group by Richier in the church, this group comprising not only Jesus on the Cross but also the Virgin Mary, St John and St.Longinus but only the figure of Jesus on the Cross remains today. In 1532 Nicolas Chatourop, a citizen of Troyes, made a pilgrimage to the famous Lorraine sanctuary called "Saint-Nicolas-de-Port" and on his return to Troyes he wrote an account of his journey and his observations of some of the religious works which he saw and these writings are a valuable resource for those studying the works of Richier and his contemporaries. Chatourop's observations were used by dom Calmet in his Richier biography and two hundred years later were to be used by the Troyes scholar Grosley in his writings.

While travelling from Troyes to Saint-Nicolas, Chatourop visited Bar-le-Duc and one of the churches there, Notre-Dame. This church had been the only parish church in Bar-le-Duc until 1688 and it was linked to a benédictine priory founded in 1088 by Princess Sophie and given by her to the Saint-Mihiel Abbey. Chatourop wrote about a work which had caught his attention and he considered of great beauty by "M.Légier, tailleur d'images, le plus expert et meilleur ouvrier en dict art que l'on vit jamais" and wrote of the beautiful crucifix which he had seen in the parish of Notre-Dame in Bar-le-Duc this accompanied by St John supporting the Virgin Mary and Saint Longinus as well as four angels depicted receiving into chalices the Saviour's blood which flowed from his four wounds.

=== The Swooning Virgin, Saint Mihiel ===
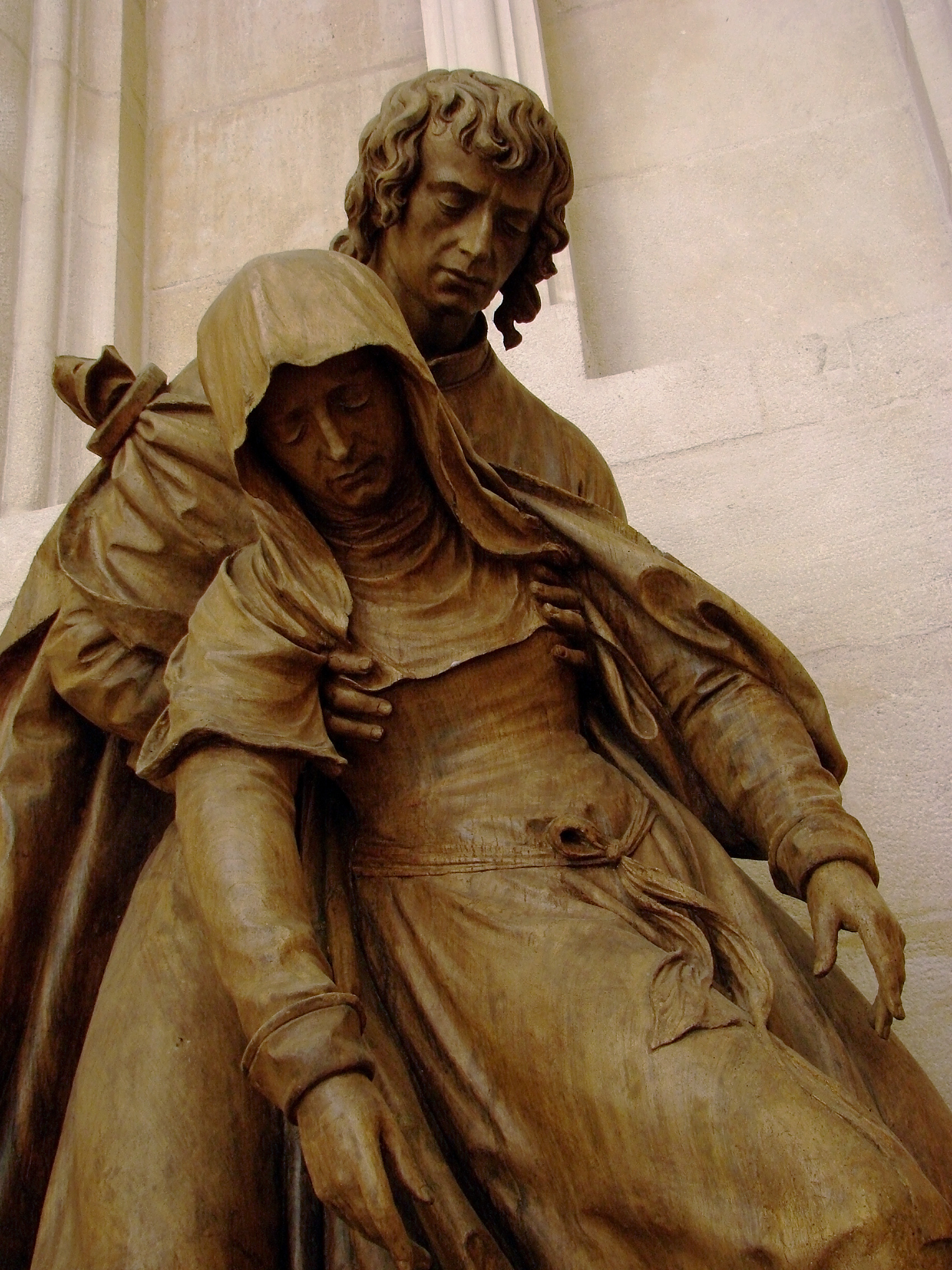
The Swooning Virgin or La Pâmoison de La Vierge, in the Abbey Church of St Michel in Saint Mihiel

The Swooning Virgin' (La Pâmoison de La Vierge) is also in Saint-Mihiel and in the Abbey Church there (the abbaye de bénédictins Saint-Michel). As we see in the photograph of the work shown above, St John is shown supporting the Virgin Mary who appears to have passed out, overwhelmed by grief. Scholars consider this to be what is left of a Calvary group of nine figures which was executed in the 1530s. It seems that Chatourop, the Troyes merchant mentioned in the section on Bar-le-Duc, passed by Saint-Mihiel after leaving Bar-le-Duc and paid a visit to the Abbey Church. Here he wrote of having seen several works of sculpture by Ligier but he did not give a full description of these works.

In the vastness of the Saint-Mihiel Abbey Paul Denis writes how ones attention is drawn to the composition of what is known as the "swooning virgin" ("La Pâmoison" in French).

Records show that until 1720 the entire group remained in the chapels of the Abbey Church at which time the resident monks decided to transform the chapels and the statues were dispersed or lost with the exception of the depiction of Christ on His Cross which was kept in the refractory and the "swooning Virgin Mary" which remained on the church premises.

Events took a dramatic turn during the French Revolution in 1792, when the crucifix was taken from the church by the mob and burnt along with other works of art. It seems that the next morning a local woman passed the embers of the fire and found in the ashes the head of Jesus which had survived the fire and was more or less intact. She took it home where it stayed for many years. It was subsequently discovered in a granary and came to the notice of a Vaucoulers sculptor called Pierson who made a model of it and produced several replicas one of which was acquired by the Musée de Nancy.

Thus all that remains of what Chatourop had so admired when visiting Saint Mihiel, is the "Pâmoison" and Pierson's models of Jesus' head plus the actual head retrieved from the fire.

The carving is made from walnut and would originally have had a polychrome finish but this has worn away. |- |}

=== Crucifix in Nancy Cathedral ===
There is a large crucifix carved from wood in the Cathédrale Notre-Dame-de-l’Annonciation et Saint-Sigisbert in Nancy which has been attributed to Richier. It is located on the north side of the cathedral in a side chapel by the apse. It has a height of 2.10 metres. This crucifix came to the cathedral from the Convent of the Clarisses in Pont-à-Mousson. It was thought to have been erected at her own cost by Philippe de Gueldres in the garden of the Clarisses convent. See "Miscellaneous notes" for some information on this convent.

=== The Calvary, St Ėtienne, Bar-le-Duc ===
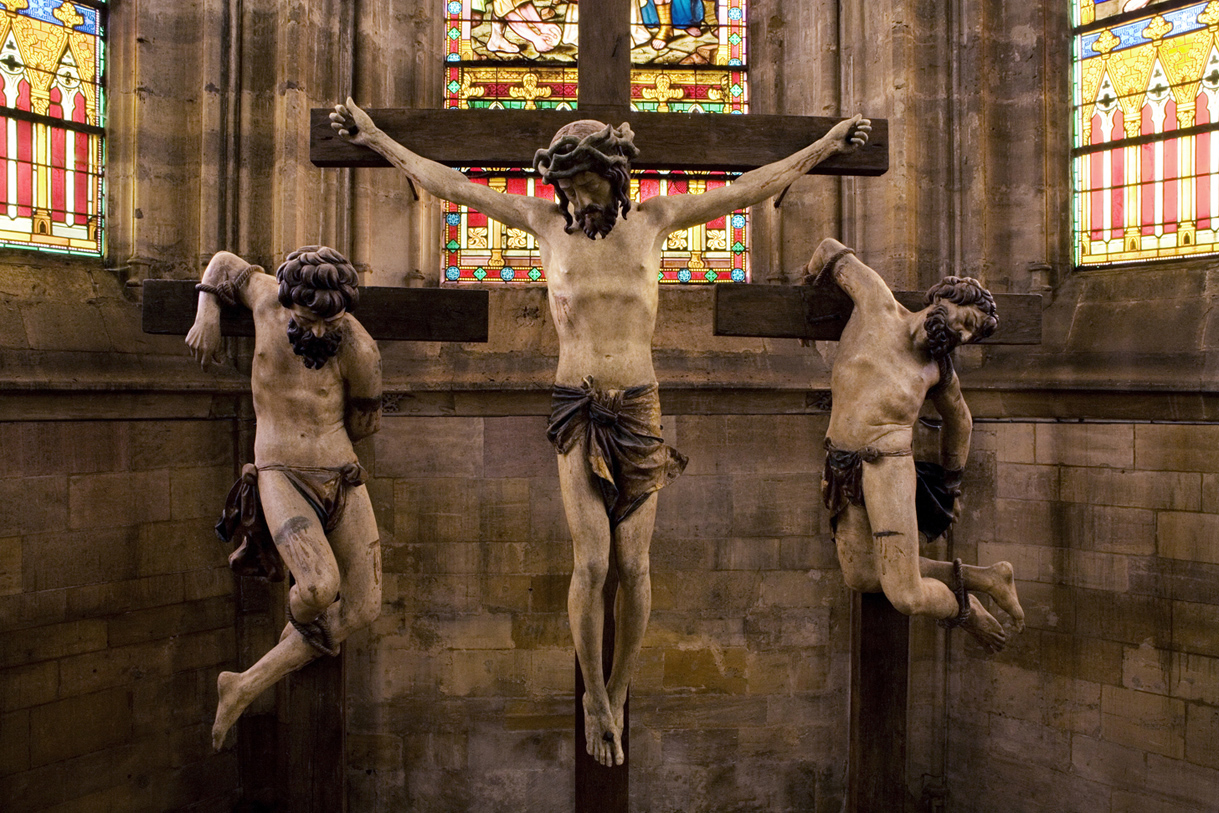
Christ and the two robbers being crucified in St Ėtienne's church in Bar-le-Duc. Photograph courtesy of Clément Guillaume

|There are two works in the church of St Ėtienne in Bar-le-Duc which are attributed to Richier. One is a Calvary depicting the crucifixion of Jesus Christ and the two robbers. The Calvary is thought to have been carved in about 1532. The robbers have agonized facial expression while their contorted bodies contrast with the calmness which seems to emanate from Christ himself.

Saint Ėtienne's church was the former Collegiate Church of St Pierre. The church has stained-glass by Maréchal de Metz and Champigneulle. In France of course St Ėtienne equates to St Stephen

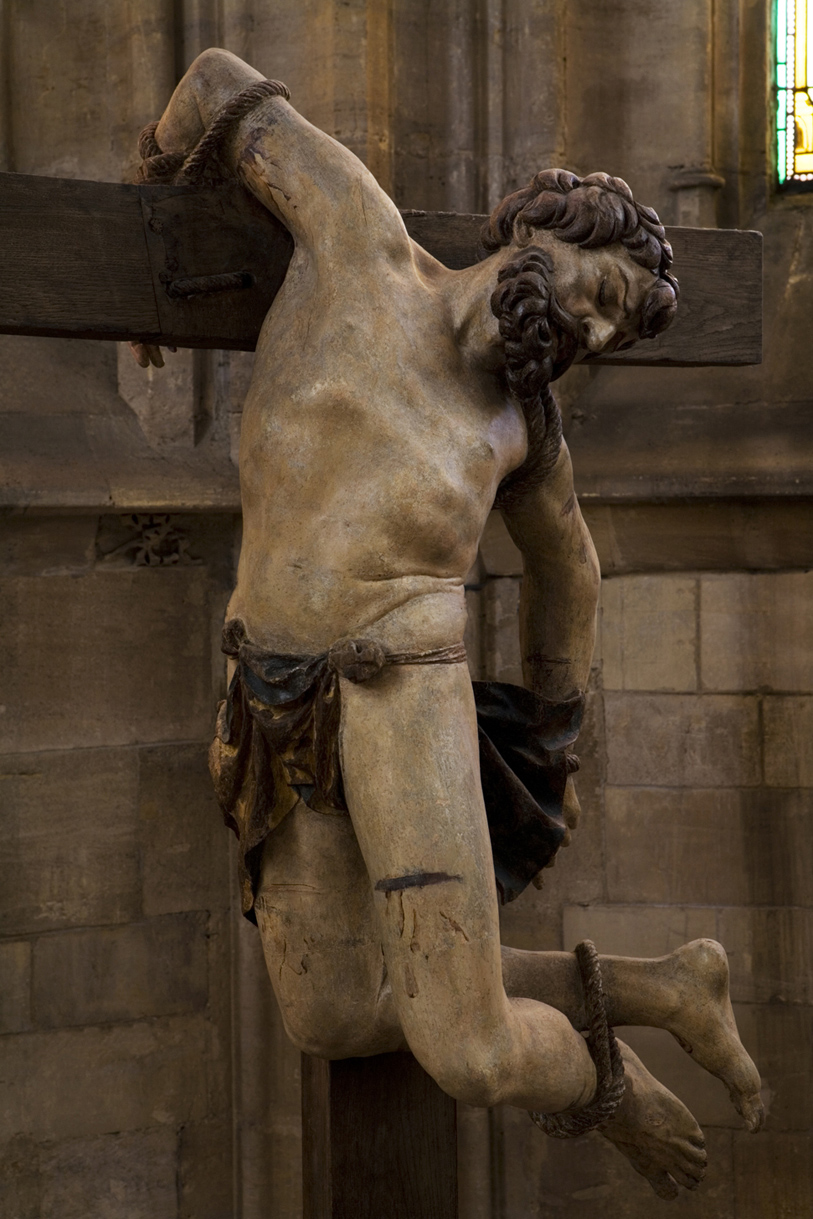
Detail from calvary in church of Saint-Étienne in Bar-le-Duc.Photograph shown courtesy Clément Guillaume, all rights reserved

The church of Saint-Étienne, also known as the church of Saint-Pierre, is located in a part of Bar-le-Duc known as "Ville-Haute". Describing Richier's composition, Paul Denis expresses the view that the "good robber", which follows convention and is placed to the right of Jesus Christ, shows a certain hope as though he has accepted Christ's pardon ("il rend en paix son denier soupir") whereas the "bad robber" exudes sadness and despair and his body is contorted into an almost impossible shape. It seems unlikely that he will find peace in death.

This work is carved from walnut which was then painted over. Denis believes the depiction of Christ and the two robbers are what remains of a much larger work, perhaps including the Virgin Mary, St John and Mary Magdalene but these have not been traced and Paul suspects that they went missing during the chaotic times of the French Revolution.

Paul also notes that the crosses of the good and bad robber were of a "T" shape and that the robbers were fixed to the crosses by rope rather than their being nailed. Paul states that this was the way the robbers were portrayed in ancient Christian art.

== The "Chapelle des Princes" in Bar-le-Duc ==
Although this chapel and the Saint Maxe Collegiate Church of which this was a part, were demolished many years ago, the pieces of Richier sculpture that were in the chapel are currently either in the library of the Société de L'histoire du Protestantisme Finançais or the Louvre.

=== The Collegiate Church of Saint-Maxe in Bar-le-Duc ===
Not far from the Church of St Ḗtienne, in the so-called "Haut Ville" district of Bar-le-Duc, there was an even older church, dedicated to Saint Maxe and this served the old feudal fortress which stood in Bar-le-Duc and was the residence of the Counts of Bar. This church's structure was changed on many occasions and it was Gilles de Trêves who built a sumptuous chapel in the church and called it the "Chapelle des Princes".

Several reliable sources have written that the "Chapelle des Princes" contained a retable by Ligier Richier. Nicolas Luton Durival, for example, the Lorraine historian, wrote stating that the chapel included work by Richier

"La Chapelle collatérale des Princes ou de Gilles, de Trêves doyen de Saint-Maxe, est très ornée de sculpture et d'architecture. Le plafond en voûte est enrichi de compartiments, de couronnes et de roses en culs-de-lampe dorés; les fonds peints d'azur.Le dessous des arcades que forment les deux entrées de la chapelle, est aussi décore de roses et de mascarons. Le retable d'autel est d'ordre dorique : ce qui en fliit la beauté est une Annonciation en relief attachée à un fond d'architecture de bas-relief: sur le piédestal, l'année et le nom de l'artiste: Ligier Richihr 1554. Sur la corniche du retable deux figures debout représentant des prophètes, et sur le frontispice, Christ, la Vierge et saint Jean aux côtés. Huit figures, représentant les huit Pères de l'Église, grecque et latine, sont sur la première corniche qui règne autour de cette chapelle. L'artiste a représenté la Naissance de Jésus-Christ sur la croisée rès de l'auteL Sur l'autre croisée est la figure de Gilles de Trêves, à genoux devant un prie-dieu. Toutes ces figures paraissent de même main et dignes de Ligier Richier. Elles sont de pierre, polie et luisante comme le marbre". Nicolas-Luton Durival

. The retable included a bas-relief depicting the "Annunciation" and this had "Ligier Richier 1554" inscribed. There were also carvings of two of the prophets as well as Jesus Christ, the Virgin Mary and St John. There were also depictions of the "Fathers of the Church", Greek and Latin and a "Nativity" as well as a depiction of Gilles de Treves ("a genoux devant un prie-dieu"). Durival wrote "Toutes les figures paraissent de meme main et dignes de Ligier Richier."

It was by a Royal ordnance issued in March 1782 that the announcement was made that the Chapter of Saint-Maxe was to be united with that of Saint-Pierre and by the end of August the collegiate was completely abandoned. The remains of the princes of the House of Lorraine buried in the Saint-Maxe nave were moved to Saint-Pierre as were several works of funereal statuary. On 31 December 1790 Saint-Maxe was officially announced as closed by a decree issued by the authorities in Bar-le-Duc and on 2 August 1792 another decree ordered that it be sold and demolished. The various works of art were lodged in a local warehouse "pour être utilisés plus tard". There is evidence that these works of art were not looked after properly, especially in the chaotic days of the revolution.

Durival wrote that as part of the Saint Maxe altarpiece or retable, Richier had included a carving of Christ on the Cross together with the Virgin Mary and St John and that all that was left of this was a rather mutilated head which was now kept by the "Bibliothèque de la Société de l'histoire du protestantisme finançais". Paul Denis inspected this head, known as the "Christ mourant" at the library involved- "34, rue des Saints-Pères, Paris. Nous sommes heureux de remercier ici M. N. Weiss, conservateur de cet établissement, à l'obligeance duquel nous devons d'avoir pu étudier et photographier ce débris d'une des plus belles oeuvres de Richier", This work is 0.13 metres in height.

Experts have also concluded that the sculpture of the head of Saint Jérôme and the composition "L'Enfant à la crèche", now in the Louvre, were also originally in Saint-Maxe. See section on the Louvre below.

Paul Denis identifies one final Richier work which came from Saint Maxe and that was the remains of a stone plinth just 0.35 metres long. This included an inscription in clear roman letters reading "LIGIER RICHIER F". The lettering was broken off at the letter "F" but Denis thinks this would have read "Fecit". This is just further evidence of Richier having completed works for Saint Maxe. This fragment is in the collection of the Musée de Bar-le-Duc and there is a model of it in the Musée de Saint Mihiel.

=== Musée du Louvre ===
- "Tête de saint Jérôme". This stone carving was acquired by the Louvre in 1929, and as stated above, came from the "Chapel of the Princes" in the collegiate church of Saint-Maxe in Bar-le-Duc. It is thought to date from 1548–1555. This work is 0.15 metres high. Until acquired by the Louvre it was kept by a Madame Brincourt who resided in Nancy.
- "Tête de Christ couronné". This work in polychromed wood was acquired by the Louvre in 1928. The piece is attributed to the Saint-Mihiel Abbey and considered as dating to 1532.
- "L'Enfant Jésus couché dans la crèche". Acquired by the Louvre in 1852. This is thought to have been part of a "Nativity" scene, dated 1548–1555, and to have been housed originally in the "Chapelle des Princes" in the collegiate church of Saint-Maxe in Bar-le-Duc. The work is 0.50 metres high. Copies are held in the Musée du Trocadéro and in the Musées of Bar-le-Duc and Saint Mihiel.

== Christ carrying the Cross, Église de Saint-Laurente ==
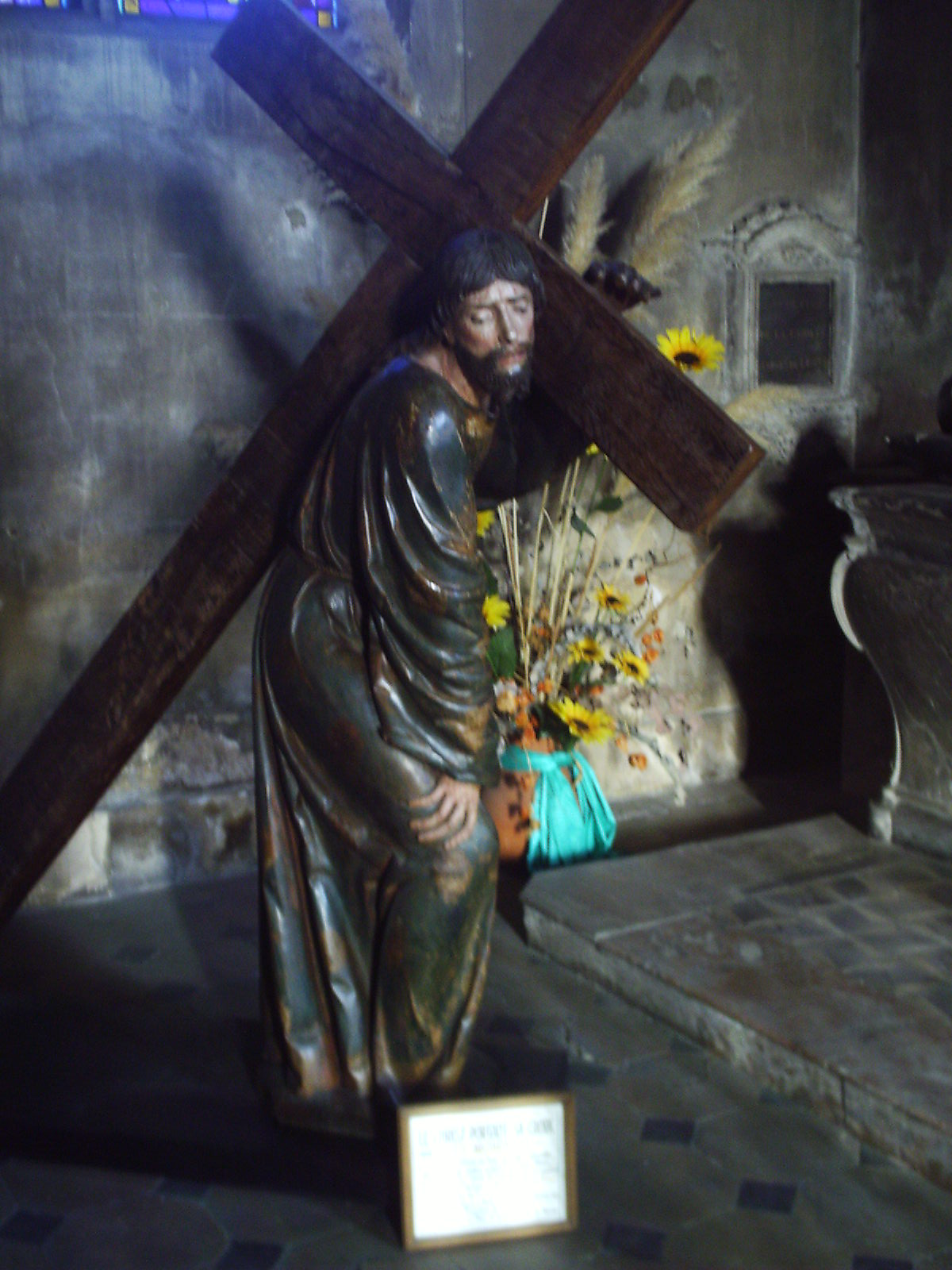
Christ carrying the Cross. Carving by Ligier Richier in Pont à Mousson

This work depicting Christ carrying the Cross is located in the chapel of Notre-Dame de Pitié in the église Saint-Laurent in Pont à Mousson. It was carved from wood and then polychromed. It is thought to have come from the chapel of "Mount Olive" erected by Philippe de Gueldres in the garden of the Clarisses monastery in Pont-à-Mousson.

== Miscellaneous works ==
=== Plafond à caissons ===
The "Plafond à caissons" (English: "Coffers or ornamental sunken ceiling panels") were traced to a house inhabited at one time by Richier at 7 rue Haute-des-Fosses in Saint Mihiel.

=== Lintel for a mantelpiece ===
This Lintel originally came from the house in Saint Mihiel in which Richier had at one time lived. The carving from two pieces of stone, recreates across the top of the fireplace, a rich damask curtain complete with folds and decorations. It is a masterpiece and made a great impression on dom Calmet when he saw it.

The work is 2 metres in length and 50 centimetres high. It was purchased in 1761 by Monsieur Baudelaire who was the prior of the Abbey of Saint-Mihiel and subsequently moved to the presbytery at Han sur Meuse. During the Great War, 1914–1918, the village and presbytery were badly damaged by German artillery fire but Richier's mantelpiece fitting survived undamaged and was later installed above a fireplace in the local Mairie. It was classified as an historic monument in 1915.

=== Statue of Holy Woman in a peasant's bonnet ===
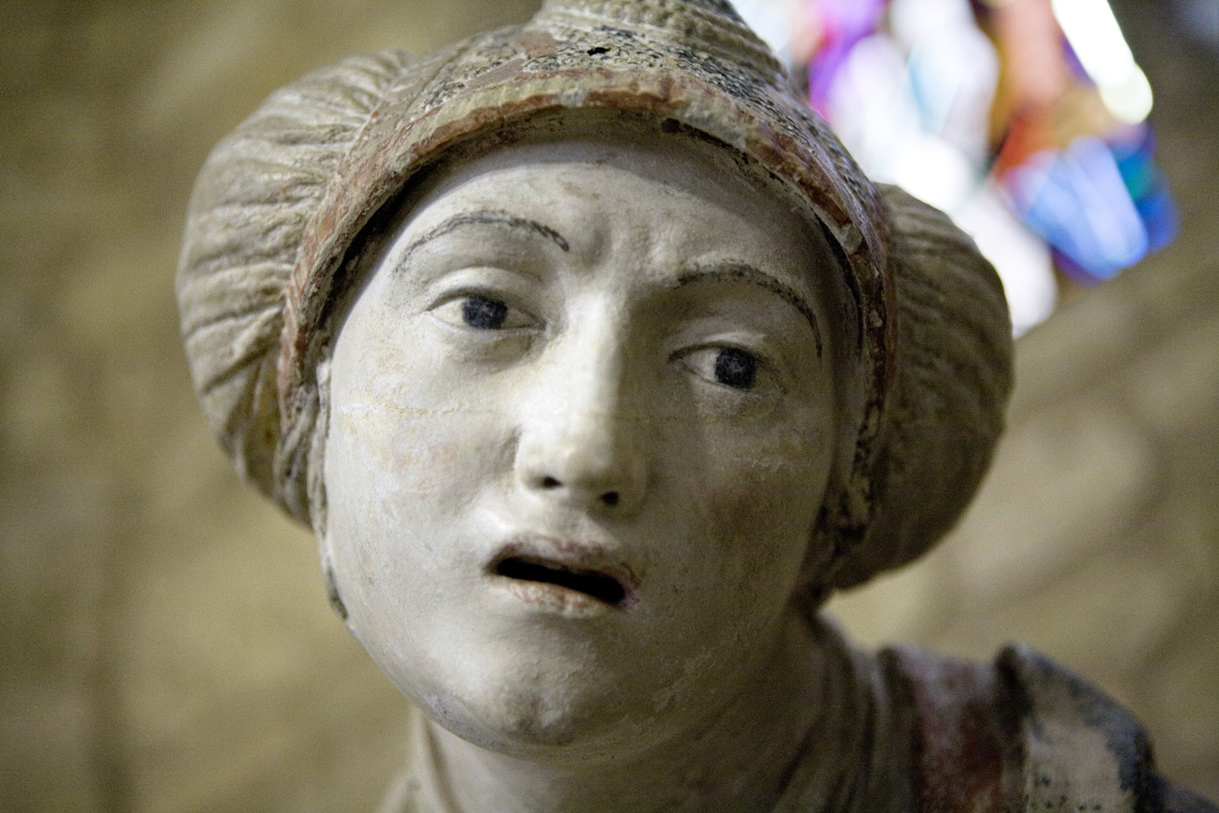
Holy Woman in a peasant's bonnet (L'église Saint-Didier, Clermont-en-Argonne)

The church of Saint-Didier dates to the 16th century. Building commenced in 1530 and the church was finally consecrated on 16 June 1577 by the Bishop of Verdun, Nicolas Bousmard. It has been touched by history on many occasions; in the 1654 siege it was transformed into a fortress, after the "Fronde" it took 20 years to repair the damage and was desecrated during the French Revolution. Finally on 5 September 1914, it was set ablaze by German soldiers from Würtenburg and had no roof for the duration of the Great War. Rebuilding took place between 1919 and 1939.

The building has many interesting fittings and furnishings and in the chapel of "Saint Roch" there is a "mise au tombeau". This includes depictions of six people but they are all from different periods and by different carvers. They came from St Anne's Chapel in Clermont Castle where they had been for many years. One of the statues is attributed to Richier and this is known as "The Holy Woman in a Peasant's Bonnet".

In their brochure "La Route Ligier Richier", the Meuse Tourist Board write "The outstanding recumbent figure of Christ is pre-16th century and the two kneeling angels in wood are 17th century. The Holy Woman in a Peasant's Bonnet is clearly superior to the other figures in the quality of its execution and in its significantly more expressive plasticity."

== Funerary works (Oeuvres Funéraires) ==
=== Tomb of Philippe de Gueldres ===
Richier executed the carving on the tomb of Philippe de Gueldres in this church. This work in limestone and shows how Richier was able to polish stone to produce a marble effect. Philippe de Gueldres was born in Grave in Brabant on 9 November 1467 and died at Pont-à-Mousson in the Clarisses convent on 28 February 1547. She was the daughter of Adolphe de Gueldres and Catherine de Bourbon and the second wife of René II of Lorraine, who died in 1547. When Rene II died retired to the Clarrises convent. In Richier's work he depicts Philippe in the dress of a Clarrises nun.

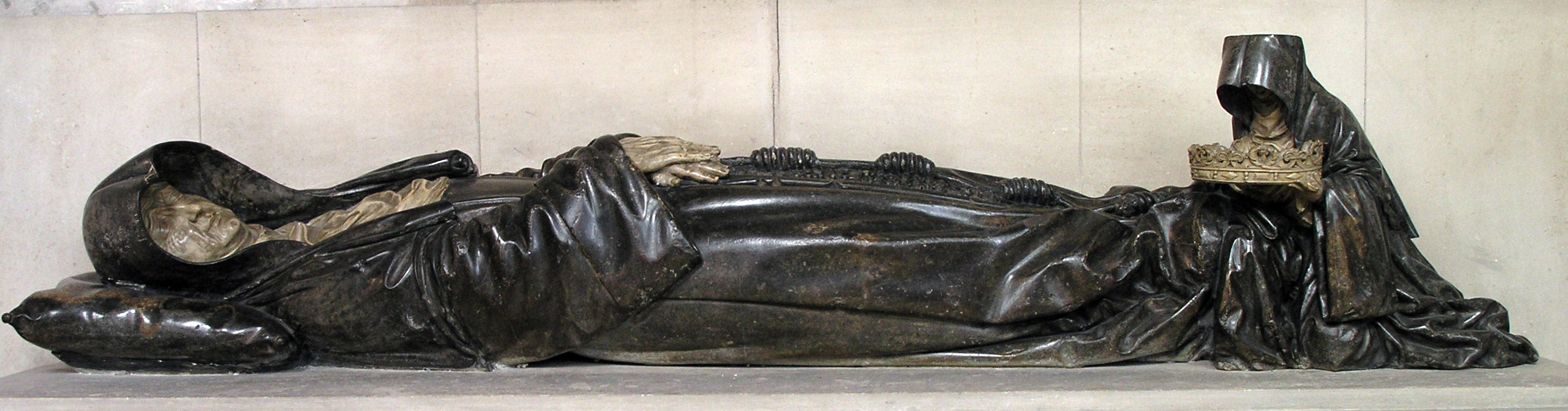
Tomb of Philippe de Gueldres

At the feet of Phillipe, Richier adds a small figurine of another Clarrises nun who is depicted on her knees and also dressed in the Clarisses habit. She holds the "ducal crown" in her hands. The work is 1.92 metres long. It came originally from the chapel of the monastery of the Clarisses in Pont-à-Mousson and is now held in the "des Cordeliers" church. There is a replica in the Musée du Trocadero.

The monastery of the Clarisses in Pont-à-Mousson was seized in the 1792 revolution and then sold and most of it demolished. The tomb of Philippe de Gueldres was violated and the bones dispersed. Other works from the monastery were despatched to Nancy and some ended up in the parish church of Saint-Laurent. The Philippe de Gueldres work is said to have been hidden in the monastery garden.

After the tomb was rediscovered and passed through various hands, none of whom realized its value. In 1822 it was discovered by a Doctor Lamoureux who recognized its importance and taken to Nancy and is now located in the old church of the Cordeliers monastery there.

=== Cadaver Tomb of René of Chalon ===
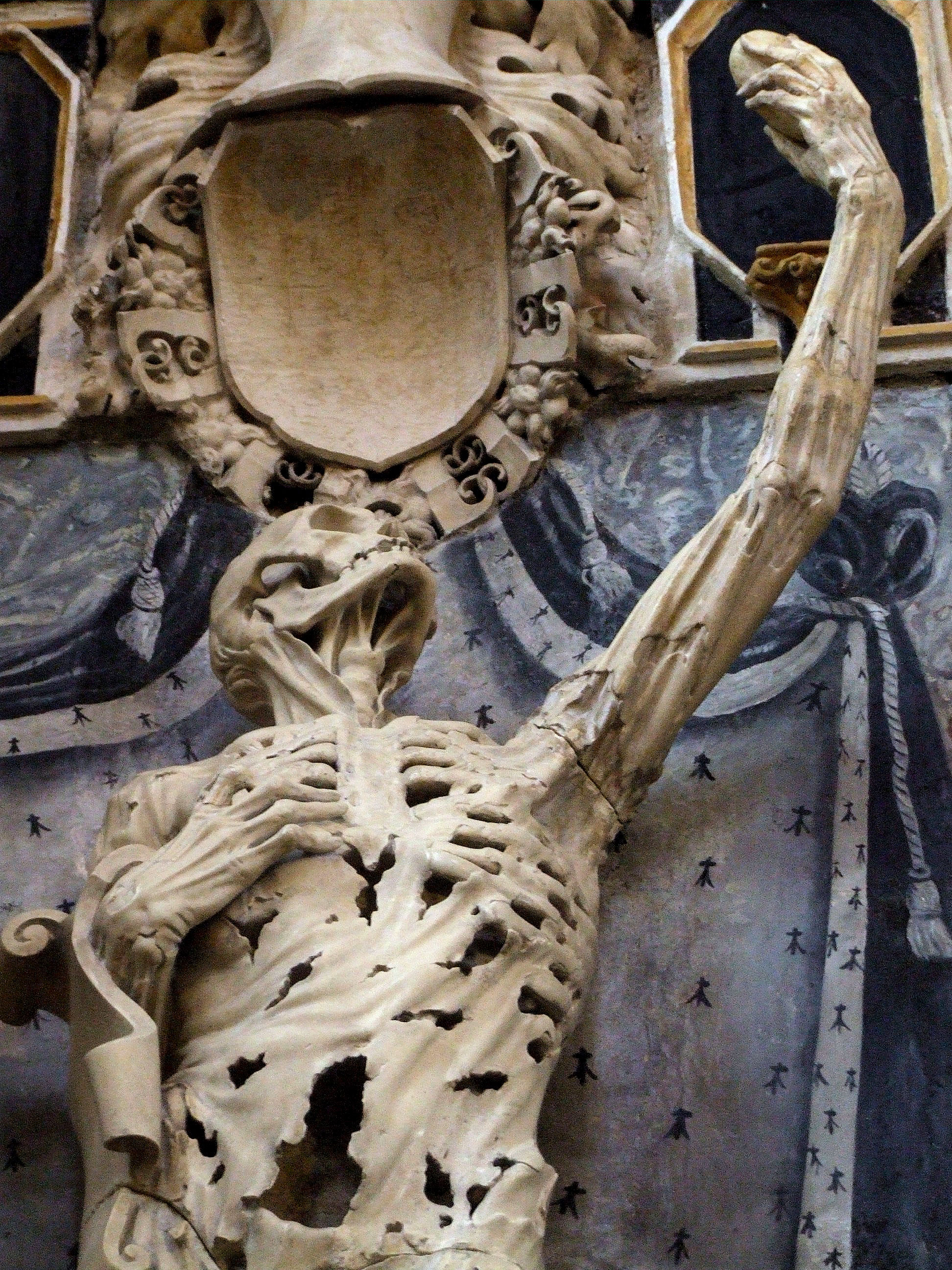
"Death as a skeleton", St Ėtienne Church Bar-le-Duc

The "Transi" in Bar-le-Duc church is a macabre work and an example of écorché. This sculpture was originally housed in the collegiate church of Saint-Maxe in Bar-le-Duc, which was abandoned in 1782. The work is also known as the "Death as a skeleton" or the "Squelette de Bar" and was commissioned as a memorial to Renė de Chalon, the brother-in-law of Duke Antoine of Lorraine. There is a cast of the work in the Musée barrois in Bar-le-Duc. The Meuse tourist office have produced a brochure covering the two works which opens with words by Bernard Noël, the French writer and poet asked "The spectator today, who so frequently hears of people being tortured to death and of death without salvation, can see this "Death as a skeleton" as a ghost that may well come back to haunt us, but what symbolism should be attributed to the heart?”

The brochure then explains that Gilles de Trèves, the Dean of Saint-Maxe’s Collegiate Church, had invited Ligier Richier to visit Bar in around 1540-1549 and to undertake extensive decorative work in the Chapel of the Princes. The work was completed in 1554. The brochure explains that Michel de Montaigne, who stayed in Bar in 1580, much admired the architecture and sculpture in polished stone and terra cotta, which must have been impressive at the time, but of which only a few fragments remain. Saint-Maxe’s Collegiate Church was demolished during the French Revolution and what was left of Ligier’s work is now in Saint Etienne’s Church. Around 1550, Richier sculpted one of the most famous funerary monuments of the French Renaissance, "Death of a Skeleton".

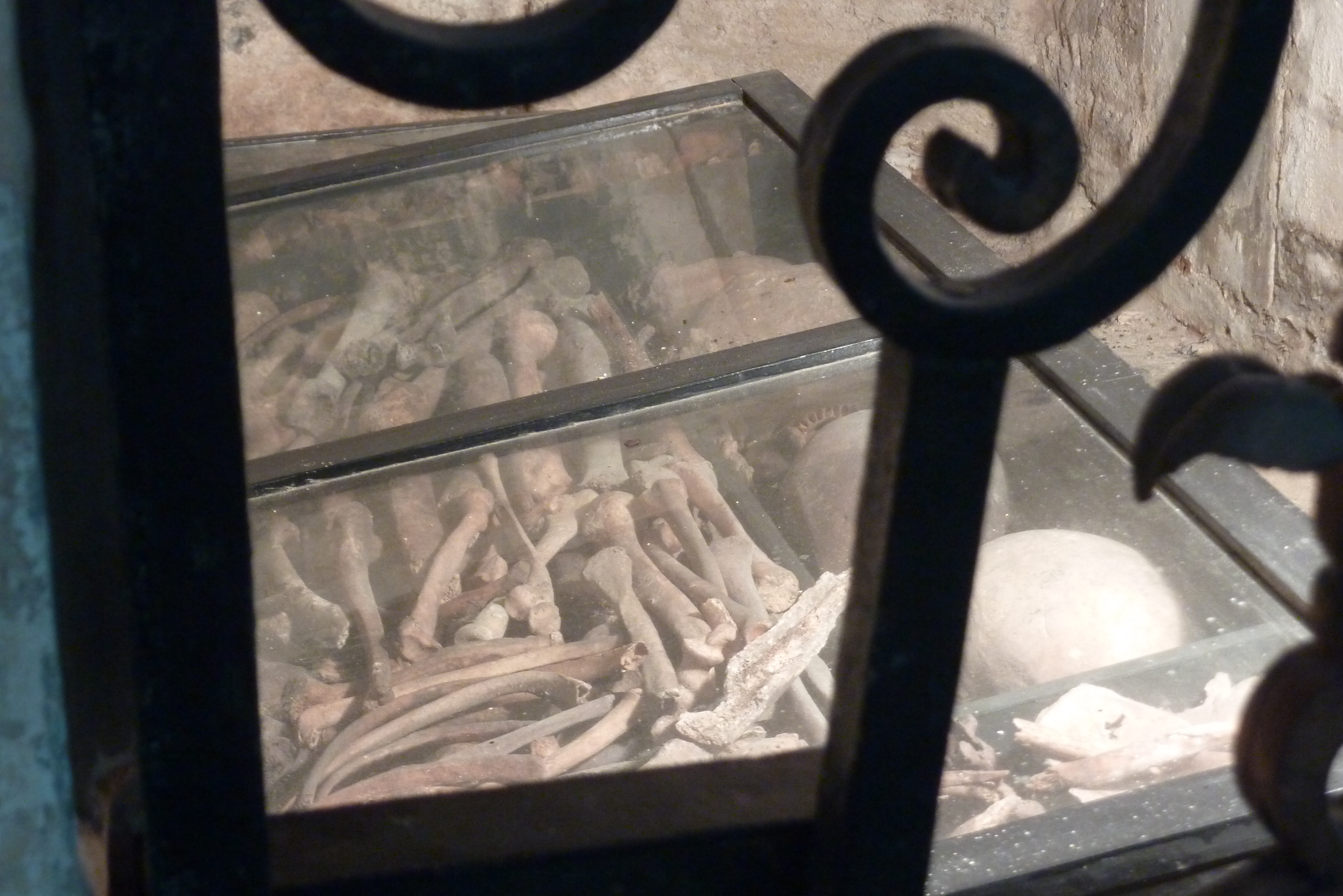
Interment of nobles of the Duchy of Bar

The brochure explains that the work is a memorial to the heart of René de Chalon, the Duke Antoine of Lorraine's brother-in-law. The figure holds de Chalon's heart up to heaven whilst the other hand rests on its chest. On the Calvary the brochure reads "Prior to Ligier Richier, many of Lorraine sculptors' workshops had already produced versions of the bloodier aspects of Christ’s Passion, a popular religious theme in Lorraine at the time". The work is 1.75 metres high.

The work was originally located in the collegiate church of St Maxe and was placed over a burial vault which held the hearts of Duke Antoine de Lorraine, René de Chalon and other family members. According to Paul Denis the work was moved from St Maxe in June 1790.

In 1810 the vicar of Saint-Étienne, Claude Rollet, issued a paper giving a full description of the work and in 1894 a model was made for the Musée de sculpture du Trocadéro. In 1898 the statue was classified as a "monument historique". Interesting to note that during the Great War 1914–1918, the "Squelette" was moved to Paris for its protection and deposited in the cellars of the Panthéon until the end of the war. It was returned to the church in 1920. It was restored in 1969 by Maxime Chiquet d’Alliancelles. In 1993 the retable and the tomb itself were also classified as historic monuments and were also restored.

There is a replica of this work in the Musée barrois

=== Recumbent effigies for René de Beauvau and Claude de Baudoche ===
These works by Richier were originally in the old parish church of Noviant-aux-Prés in the canton of Domêvre-en-Haye in the arrondissement of Toul. In 1866 they were taken to the Musée Lorraine in Nancy and are now held in the Église des Cordeliers.

Richier follows the traditions of the Middle Ages in his composition with the two recumbent effigies lying side by side, hands clasped together in prayer with their heads resting on a pillow. They are dressed in the sumptuous clothing of the day. See Paul Denis' work for a full description.

== The entombment ==
=== "Mise au Tombeau", St Ėtienne ===
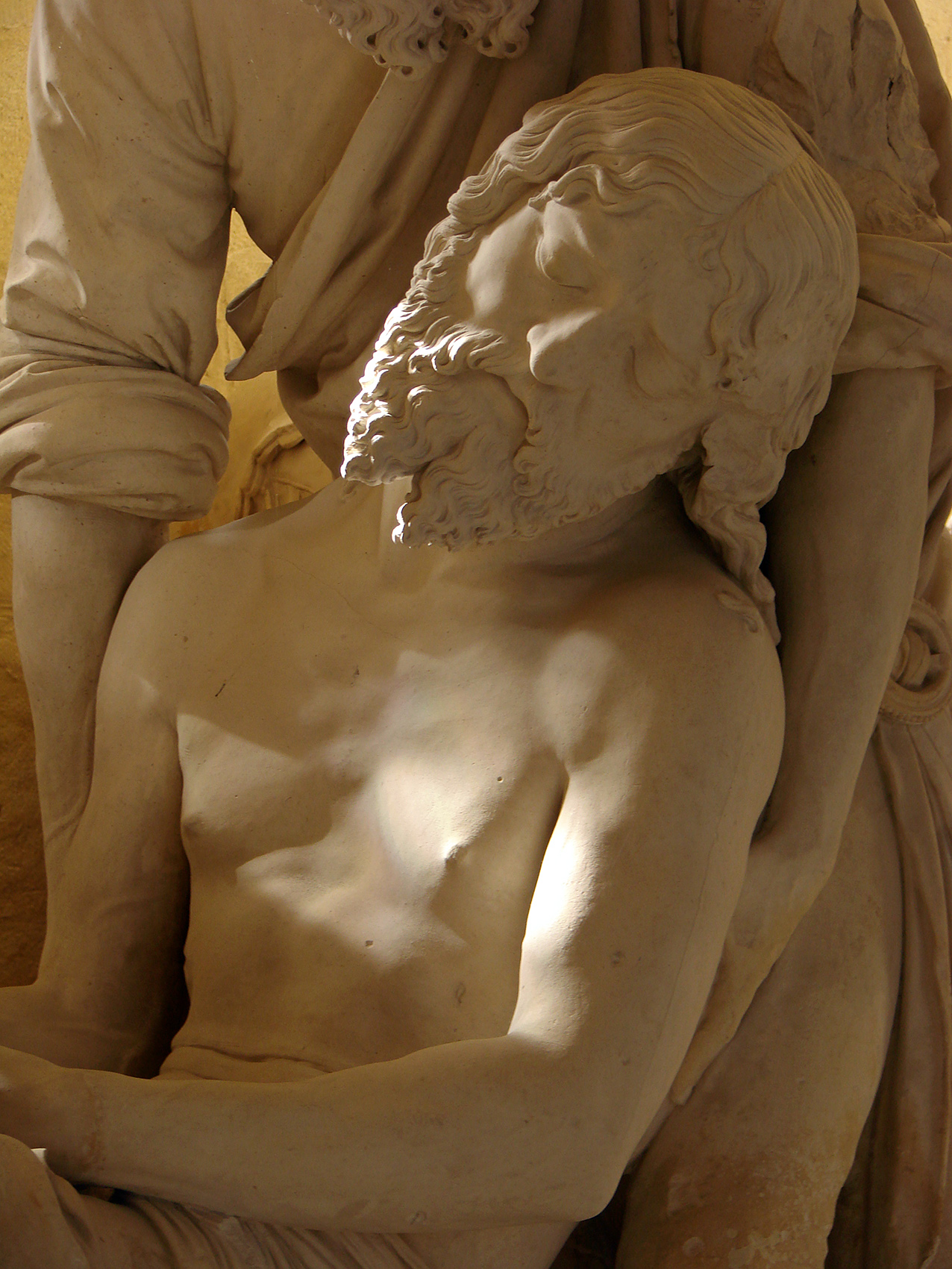
Jesus Christ in the St Ḗtienne "Mise au Tombeau"

Saint Mihiel is located by the Meuse and gave its name to a monastery which the mayor of Austrasie had had built on a hill near the town. This was later moved nearer Saint Mihiel which was originally called Saint-Michel but was corrupted over the years to Saint-Mihiel. The church of St Ėtienne in St Mihiel is a very old one, was destroyed and rebuilt several times and in one of the various excavations necessary when the church was being rebuilt the thirteen statues which make up the St Ėtienne "Mise au Tombeau" or "Sépulcre" were discovered. These thirteen statues are the depictions of those who placed Jesus Christ in his tomb after the body had been brought down from the Cross. Joseph of Arimathea and Nicodemus are shown "portent avec precaution leur precieux fardeau" (carefully carrying their precious package").

They are assisted by Martha and Salomé who have prepared the linen cover for the inside of the tomb. In describing the work, LePage writes

"Madeleine, à genoux aux pieds du Christ, attire prinicipalement l'attention du visiteur; c'est, je crois, le morceau capital de l'oeuvre. Sous la femme convertie on devine la courtisane. Sa toilette est riche, sa poitrine opulente, et sous ces grands yeux qui pleurent la mort du Maître on sent une vague reminiscence de la femme d'autrefois; cependant une douleur immense est peinte sur sa figure, L'artiste a admirablement saisi cette physionomie de Madeleine, qui a toujours tenté les peintres de toutes les époques"

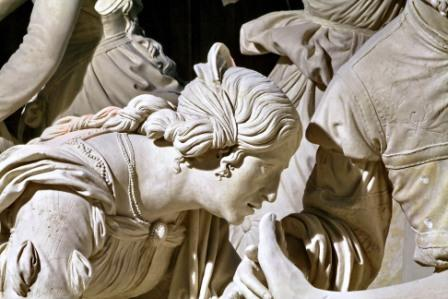
Detail from Richier's St Mihiel mise au tombeau. Photograph supplied courtesy J.M.Kinet

In Richier's YEO composition Sainte Monique is shown holding the crown of thorns which Jesus' persecutors had placed on his head. John and Mary Cleophas are shown supporting the Virgin Mary who is clearly distraught and overcome with grief. An angel carrying the Cross looks on, as does the centurion who "contemple d'un oeil étonné cette scène de douleur" and two soldiers who roll dice on the top of a drum.

It is said that the winner would have won Jesus' tunic. Scholars believe this to be Richier's final work and it was completed between 1554 and 1564 the year Richier left France to travel to Geneva. He is thought to have left it to his son Gerard to carry out the installation in the chapel of Saint-Ėtienne church and possibly add some finishing touches to the work. It stands in the south side-aisle. The figures involved are more than life-size and carved from a fine-grained Meuse limestone.

== The Piétà ==
=== The pietà at Étain Bon Dieu de Pitié ===
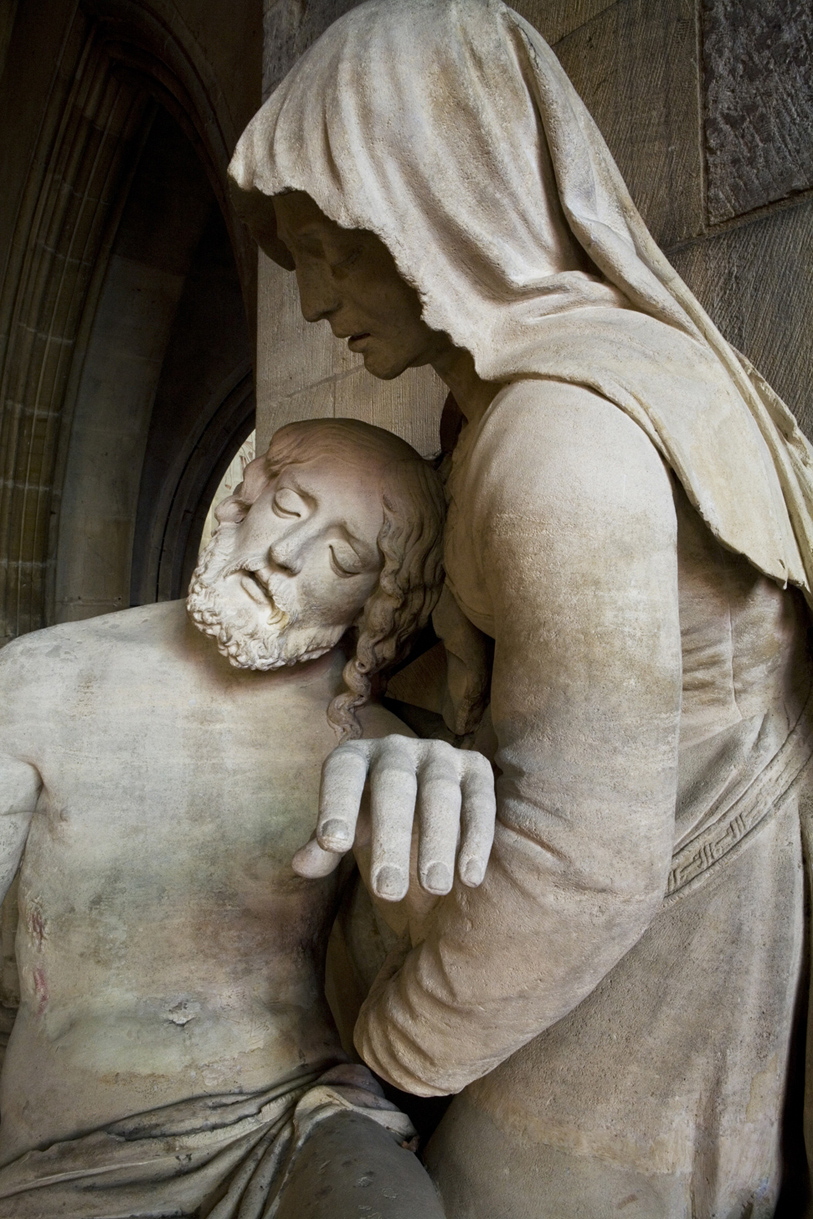
Ligier Richier work in Étain. Photograph courtesy of Clément Guillaume

This composition located near the Sacrė-Coeur altar in the Étain parish church is regarded as his first pietà. Denis Paul points to the influence of Rhenish artists on artists in Lorraine in the way they depicted the pietà and how this would have been taken up by Richier. He gives as examples, Tilman Riemensschneider's group at the University of Wurzbourg and the compositions by unknown artists at Saint-Jacques in Nuremberg and Notre Dame in Zwickau. As examples, Paul refers to the work in the church at Varangéville attributed to the workshop of Mansuy Gauvain, that at Saint-Nicolas-de-Port and that at the basilica Saint-Epvre in Nancy. Instead of the conventional depiction of the Virgin Mary being seated with the body of Christ lying across her knees, Richier's Virgin Mary is shown kneeling in front of the body and tenderly lifting His left hand as though to draw attention to the wound in his side. This was to become known as the style of the "Notre-Dame de Pitié". Christ is no longer shown in a horizontal position but gradually the position changes to a vertical one.

The work at Étain measures 1.30 metres in length and is 1.10 metres high. It is thought that the limestone used came from a quarry near to Saint-Mihiel known as "de la Justice". This stone had a tendency to yellow with age and lent itself to work with the sculptor's chisel

The work was originally carved for a tomb in a chapel in the Étain cemetery and was subsequently moved into the church probably around 1773. See section below dealing with the two terra cotta figures in Clermont-en-Argonne which are thought to have some link to the Étain work. It is certainly in the style of what had become known as "Notre-Dame de Pitié". Mary kneels in front of Jesus's body which she is propping up with her right hand. His left hand is held in her right hand. The date 1530 is inscribed at the base of the work (this puts the work as having been executed 2 years after that at Étain suggesting that it was a maquette for another Richier work, perhaps an attempt to improve on the Étain composition. It was restored by the sculptor Pierson from Vaucouleurs)

=== Maquette, Clermont-en-Argonne ===
There are two small terra cotta figures in this church with a height of around 0.35 metres which seem to be a study for a larger piece rather than a piece in its own right. In all probability therefore they were intended as a "maquette" for a second work since lost or never completed. Paul Denis expresses the view that these two pieces have all the hallmarks of Richier and could have been an early study for the Étain work or a maquette for a new study where Richier wanted to correct any imperfections he saw in the Étain work. However the dated inscribed of 1530 does suggest an association with a second work. Denis states that these two figures came from the old church of Clemont-en-Argonne ( Église de la citadelle).

== Lost works ==
According to Paul Denis, Richier executed carvings depicting Duke Antoine and his wife as well as several of their entourage, with maquettes being prepared in 1533. Denis bases this on papers left by Humbert Pierrot in the Meurthe and Moselle archives under reference B.7613. Sadly these works have been lost.

He also attributes to Richier, two carvings for the tomb of Claude de Lorraine, the Duke of Guise and Antoinette de Bourbon, which were placed in the collegiate church of Saint-Laurent in Joinville in Haute-Marne. These works have also been lost.

== Monument to Ligier Richier and associated sculptors ==
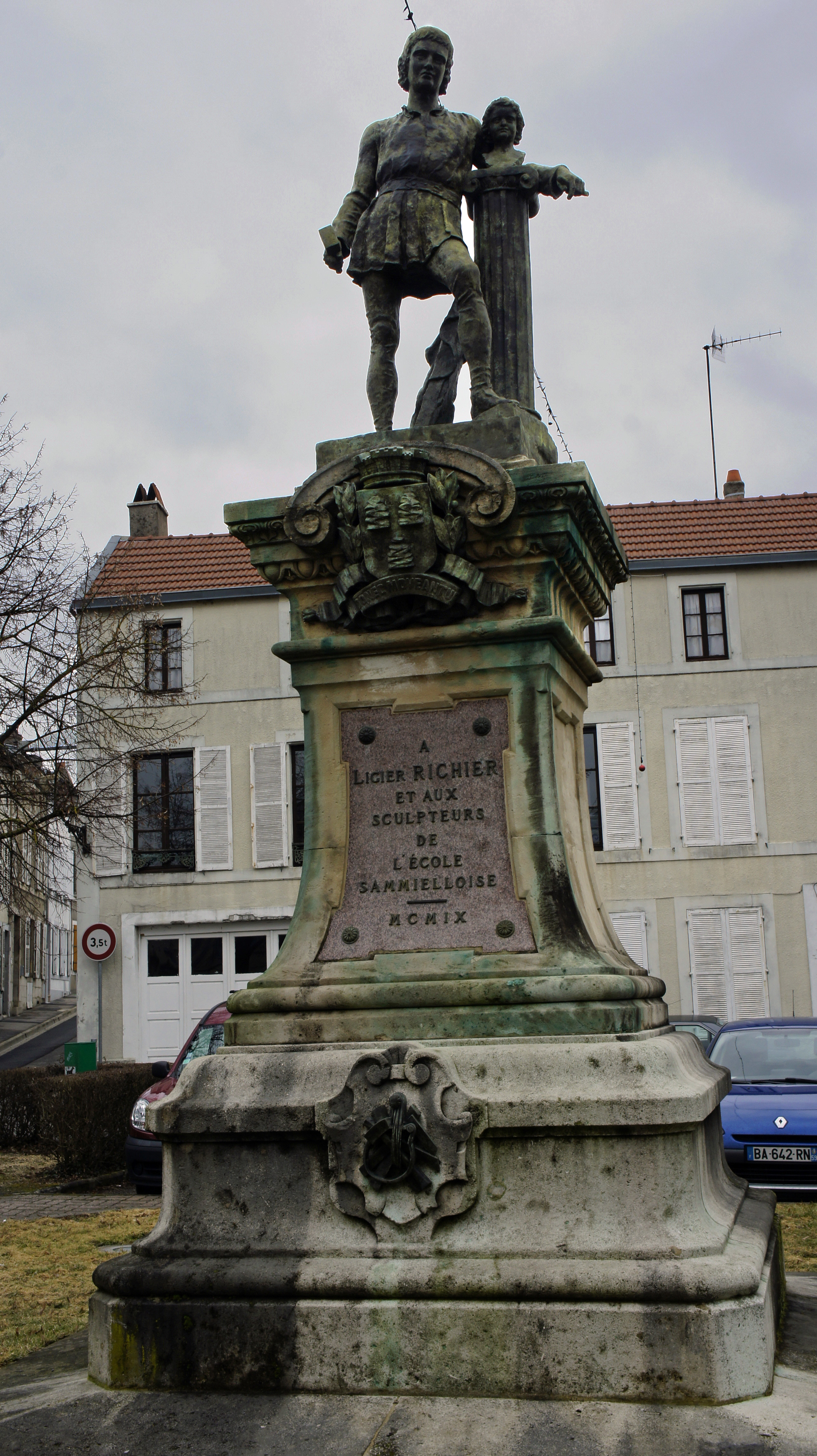
Statue to Ligier Richier in Saint Mihiel

There is a statue erected in the place Ligier Richier in Saint Mihiel dedicated to the work of Ligier Richier and his fellow Saint Mihiel sculptors, as shown in the photograph above. It involves a bronze depicting a young man who stands next to a half-pillar on which sits a model of the head of a baby. In his right hand he holds a sculptor's mallet. The entire composition stands on a pedestal.

It was following a public subscription launched in 1900 that the monument was erected in 1908. The sculptural work on the pedestal was completed by L.Gallant of Saint-Mihiel and the bronze was completed by the foundry of A.Salin in Dammarie sur Saulx based on a model sculpted by Léon Vadel. The bronze was taken by the Germans during the 1914-1918 war and melted down for use in munitions manufacture. It was replaced in 1933. This time the foundry of Durenne in Val d'Osne were used but still based the bronze on Vadel's model. The 1900 monument had incidentally replaced one erected in 1836 on the occasion of the three hundredth anniversary of the completion of the Saint Mihiel "mise au tombeau" of which the people of Saint-Mihiel have always been fiercely proud.

=== Convent of Clarisses ===
The Convent of Clarisses in Pont-à-Mousson was one of 18 such convents established by St Colette of Corbie. Colette joined the Third Order of St. Francis and became a hermit, living in a hut near the parish church, under the spiritual direction of the abbot of the local Benedictine abbey. In 1406, after four years of this ascetic way of life and as a result of a number of dreams and visions, Colette came to believe that she was being called to reform the Poor Clares, the Second Order of the Franciscan movement, and return that Order to its original Franciscan ideals of absolute poverty and austerity. In October of that year, she travelled to Nice to seek the blessing of the Antipope Benedict XIII, who was recognized in France at that time as the rightful pope. Benedict received her and allowed her to take vows as a Poor Clare nun, giving her mission his blessing through several papal bulls, which authorized her both to reform existing monasteries and to found new ones according to her ideals. She then spent several years in Beaune in the Duchy of Burgundy, under the guidance of the Blessed Henry of Beaume and in 1408, she established the first successful community of Poor Clare nuns under her inspired way of life in a semi-derelict monastery of the Order in Besançon. From there, her reform spread to Auxonne (1412), to Poligny (1415) and to Amiens. It began to spread outside France with foundations in Ghent in Flanders (1442) and Heidelberg, Germany (1444), and from there to other communities of Poor Clares around Europe. In total, 18 monasteries were founded before her death in March 1447. One of these was that at Pont-à-Mousson.

=== L'Imagier ===
Sculptors of Ligier Richier's era were known as "Imagiers". In medieval French this was written as "yimagier".

=== Materials used ===
Champagne and Lorraine were rich in the raw materials used by the artists of the period who would carve from stone, wood, bronze or terra cotta. There were many quarries in the region and those who favoured limestone had several quarries at their disposal which offered limestone of the highest quality. Often works would be painted in polychrome, basic paints made from pigment and colour powders. Very often these colours have now worn away and are certainly not as rich as they would have been when first applied but in some cases the polychroming has been maintained especially where works were not overexposed to the elements.

Richier for example used limestone from the quarries at St Mihiel and the surrounding region and developed a way of polishing the limestone to produce a marble like effect, a process known as "l'encaustiquage". One such limestone was that taken from the quarries at Sorcy, a form of Euville stone. This was the stone used for the "mise-au-tombeau" at St Etienne.

== Gallery ==
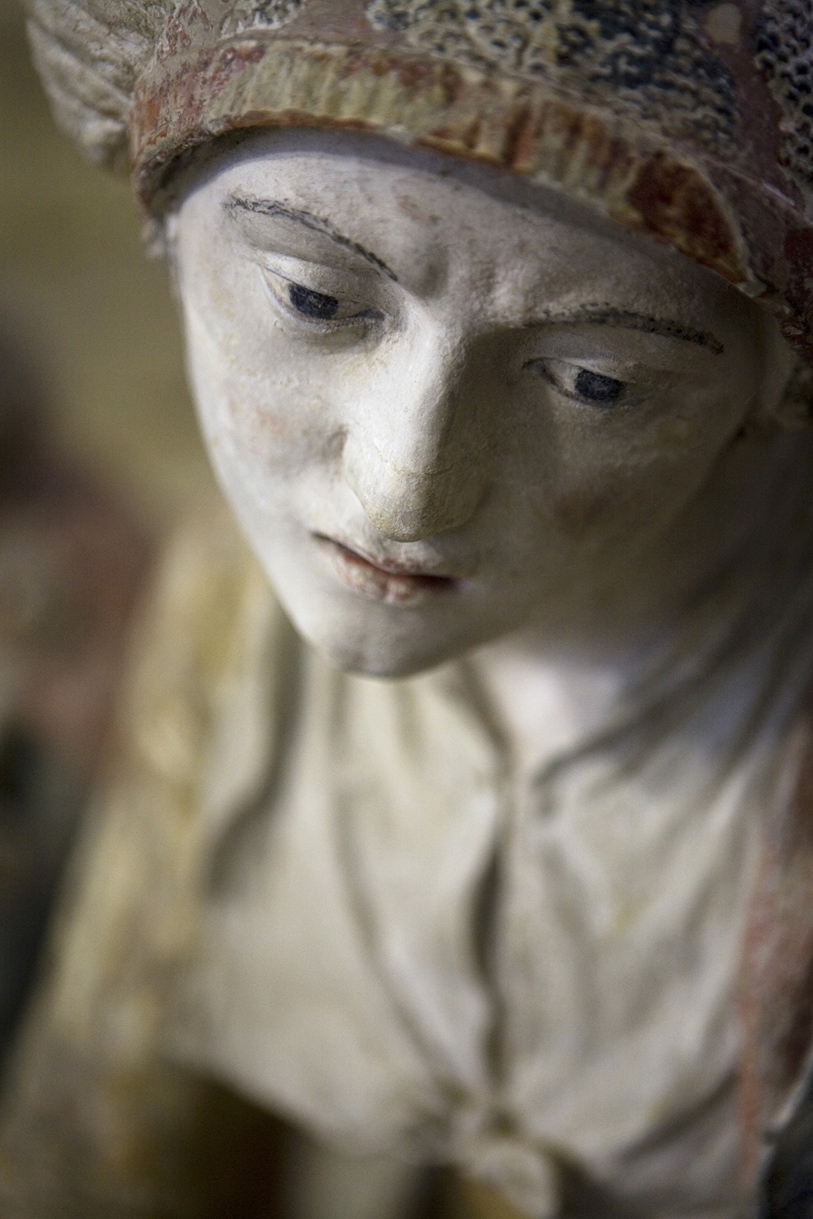
Clermont-en-Argonne

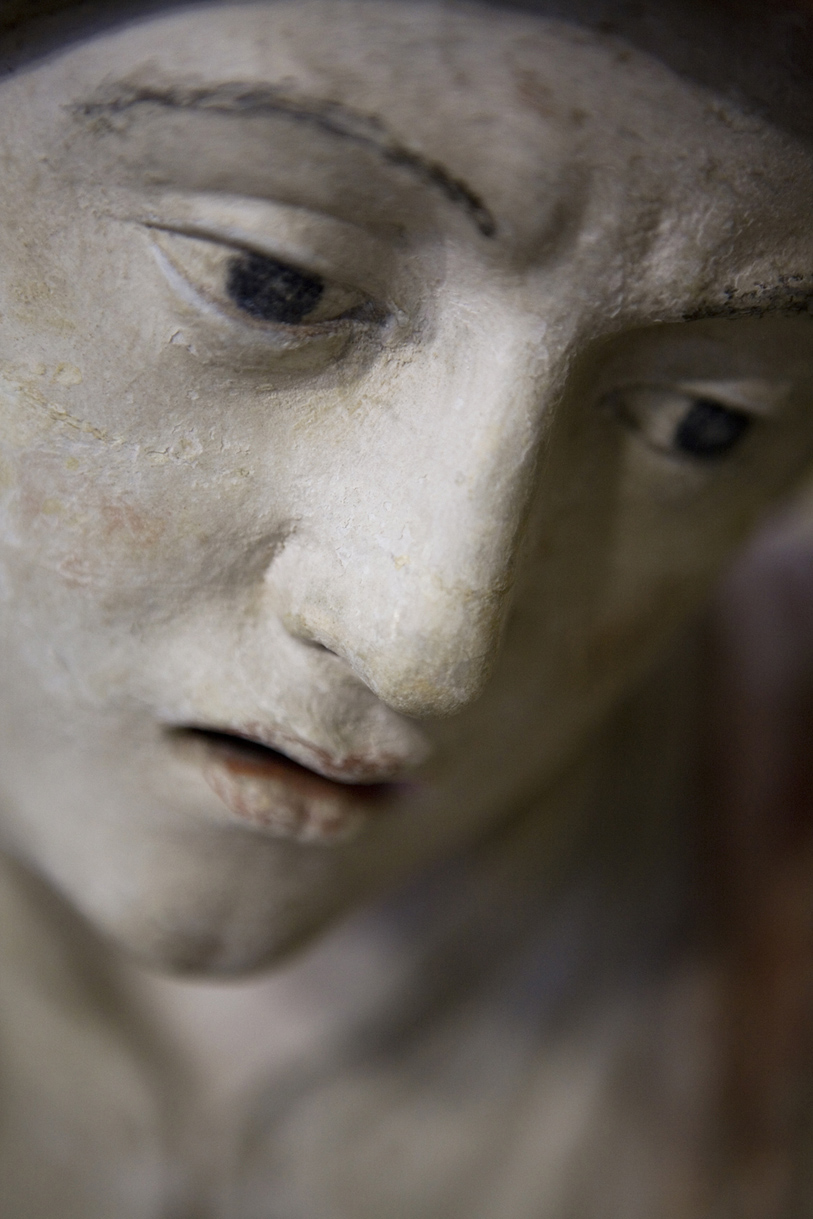
Ligier Richier work. Clermont-en-Argonne

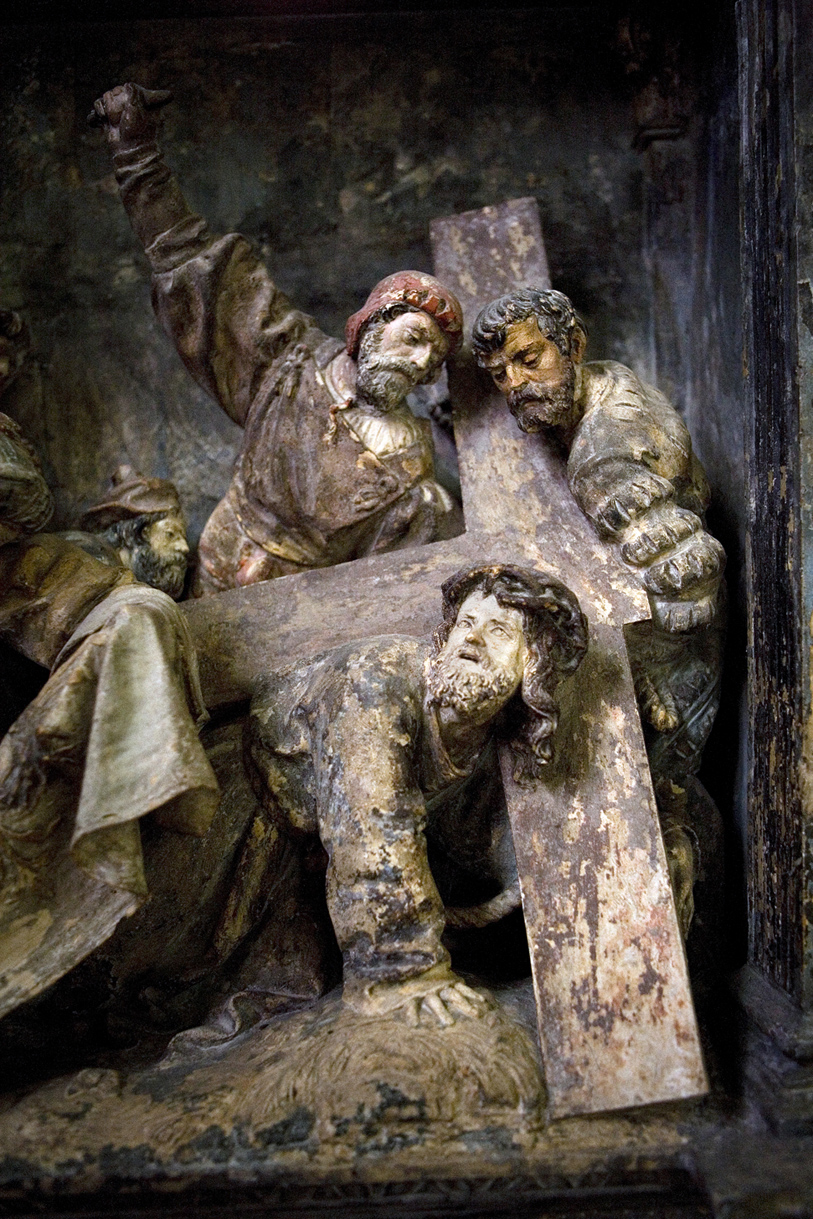
Part of Hattonchâtel altarpiece

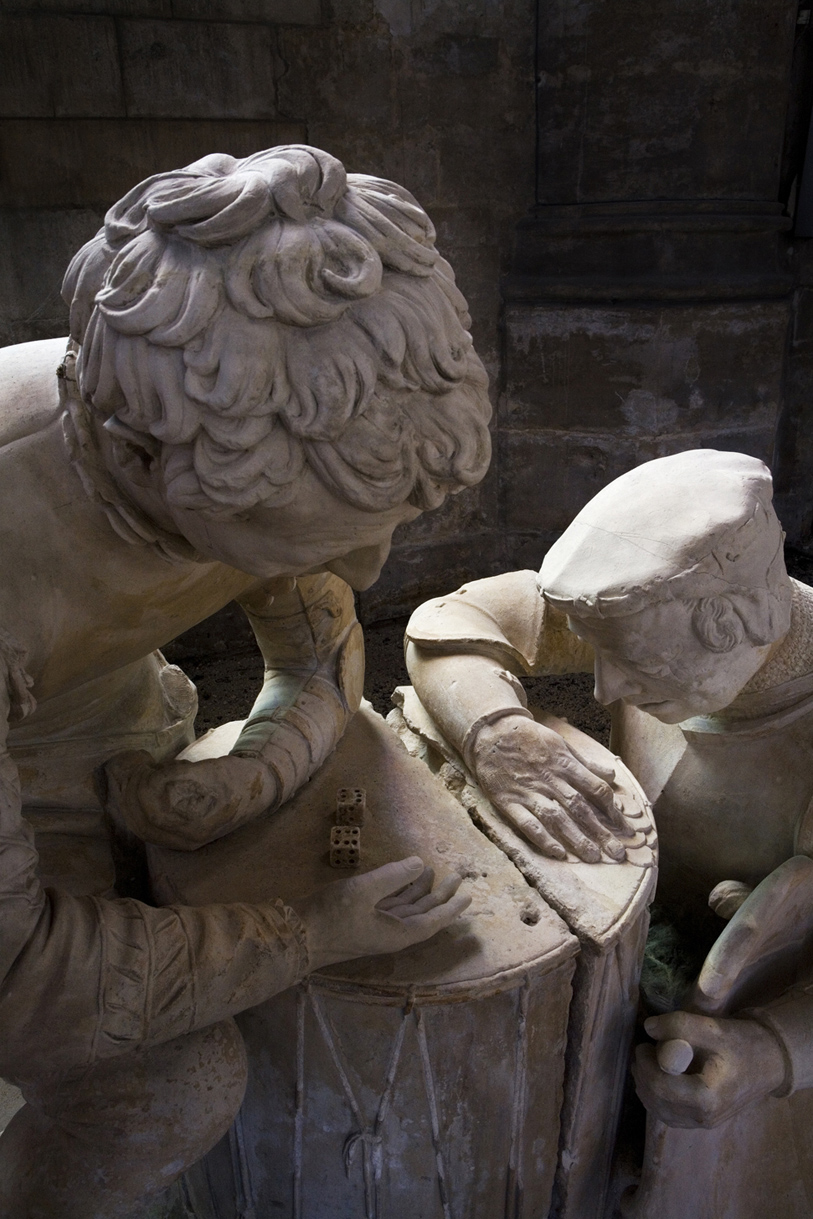
Soldiers roll dice to win Jesus' tunic

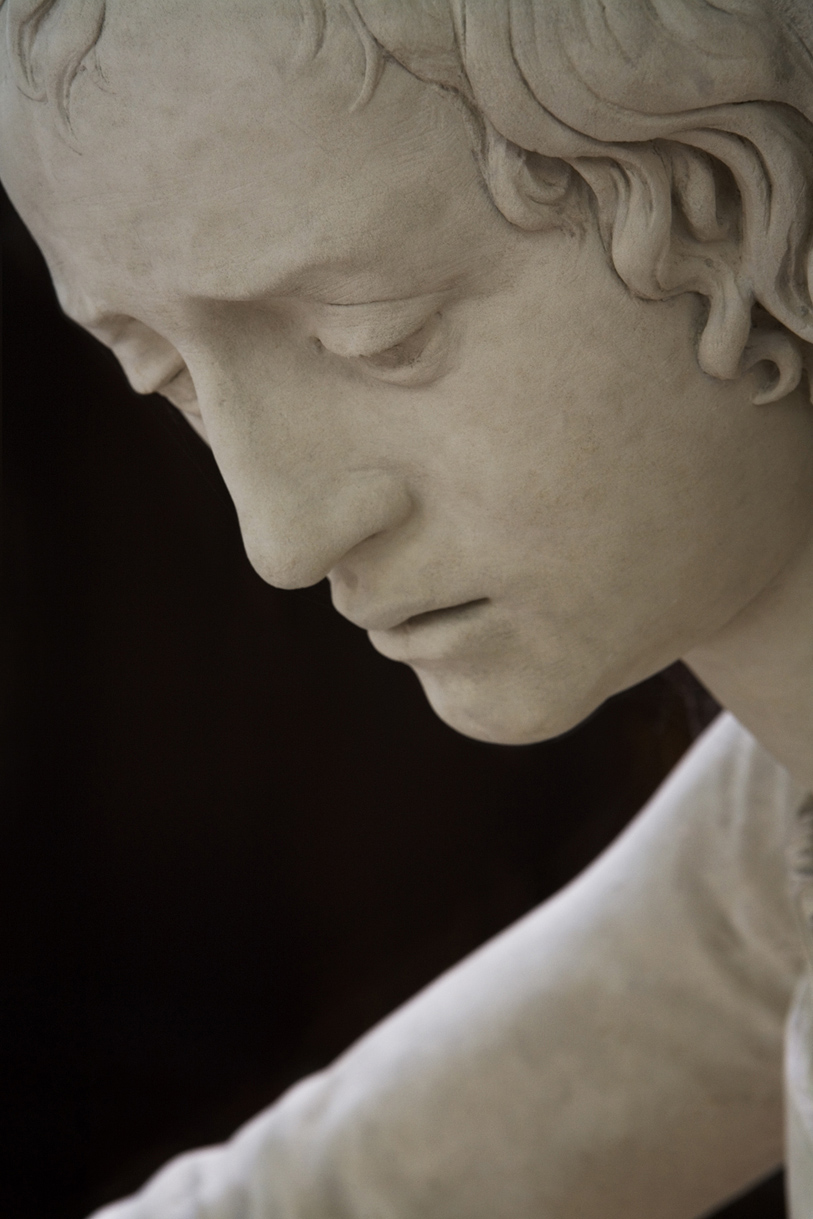
Part of mise au tombeau St Mihiel.

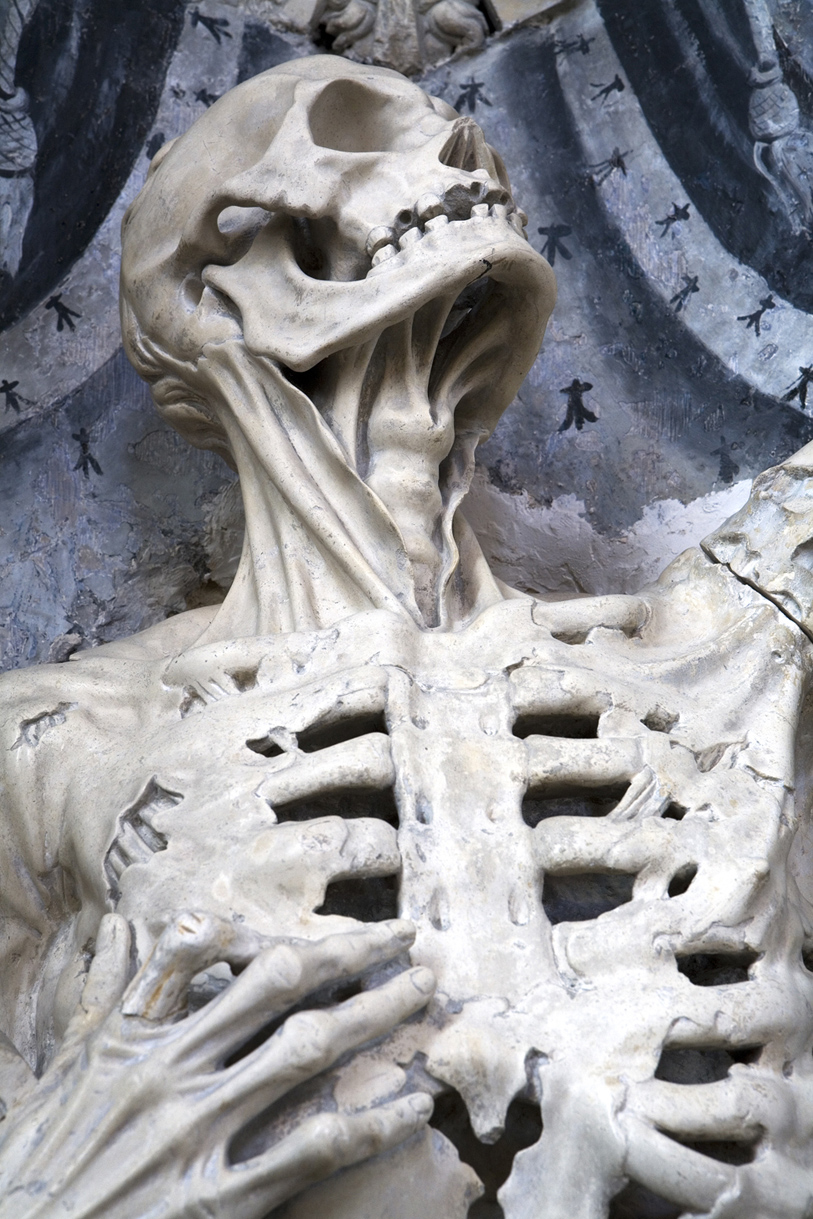
The Transi

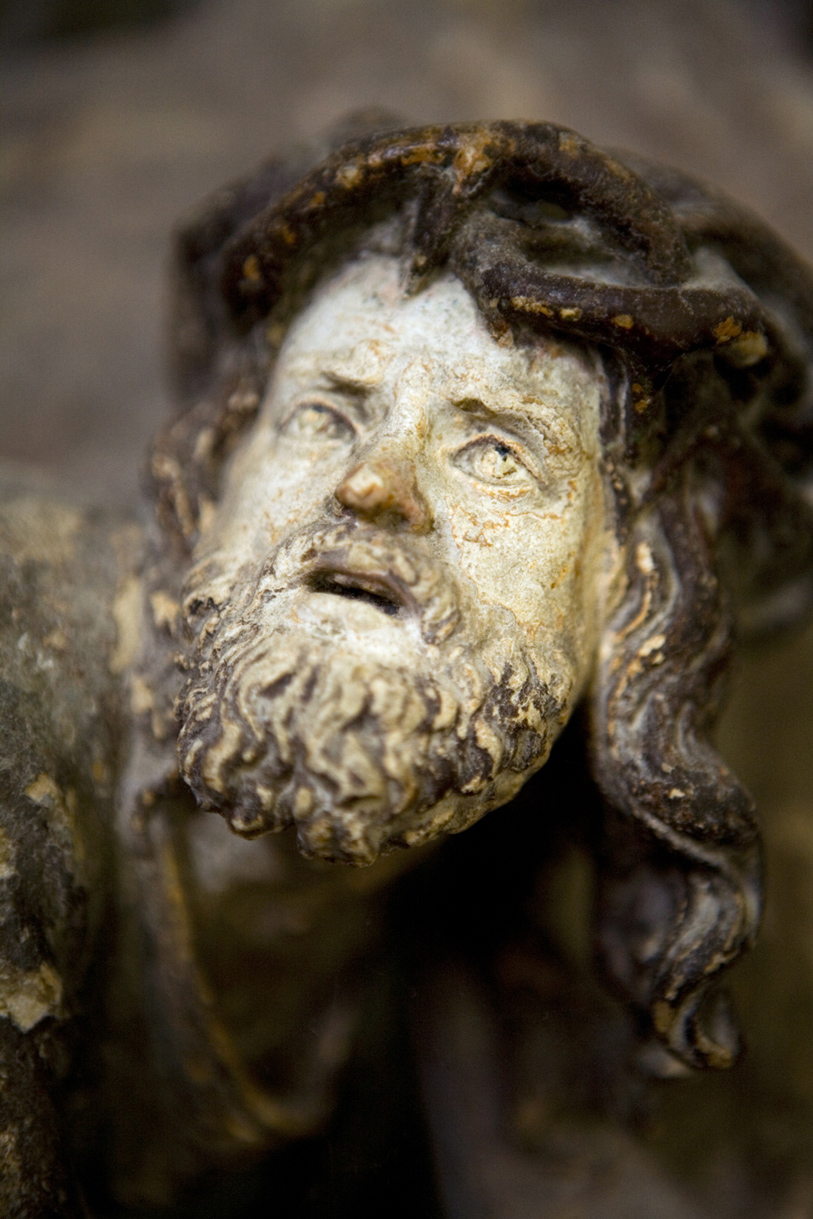
Part of Hattonchâtel altarpiece

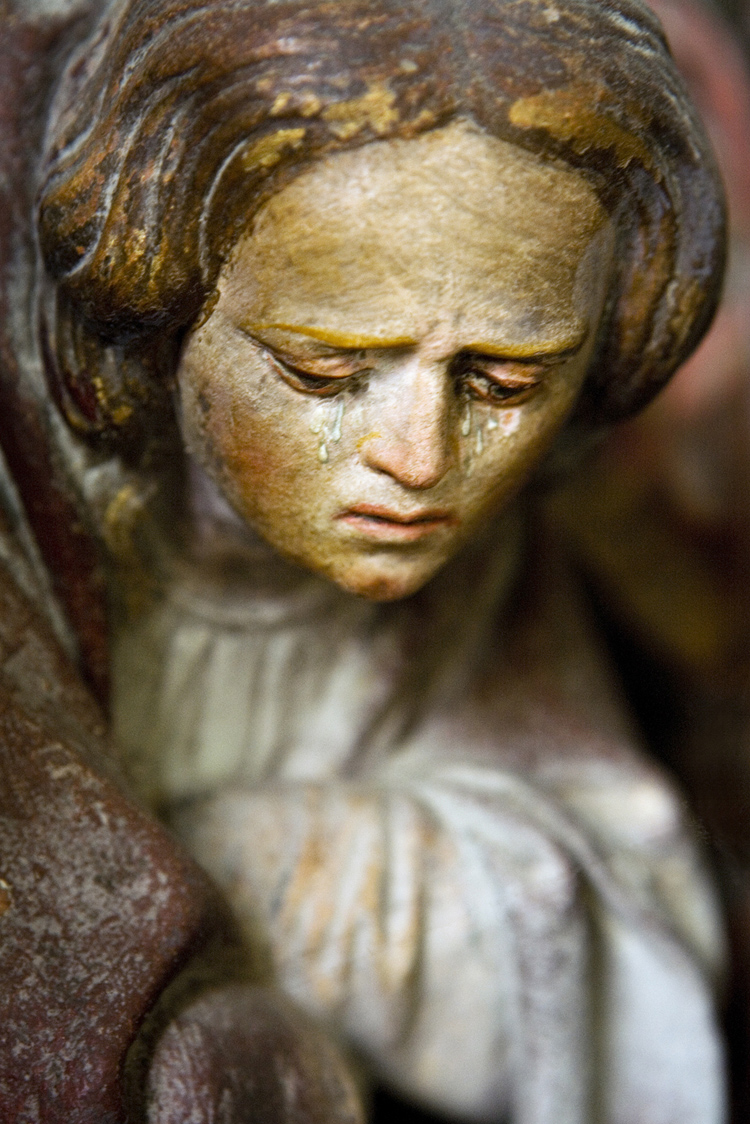
Part of Hattonchâtel altarpiece

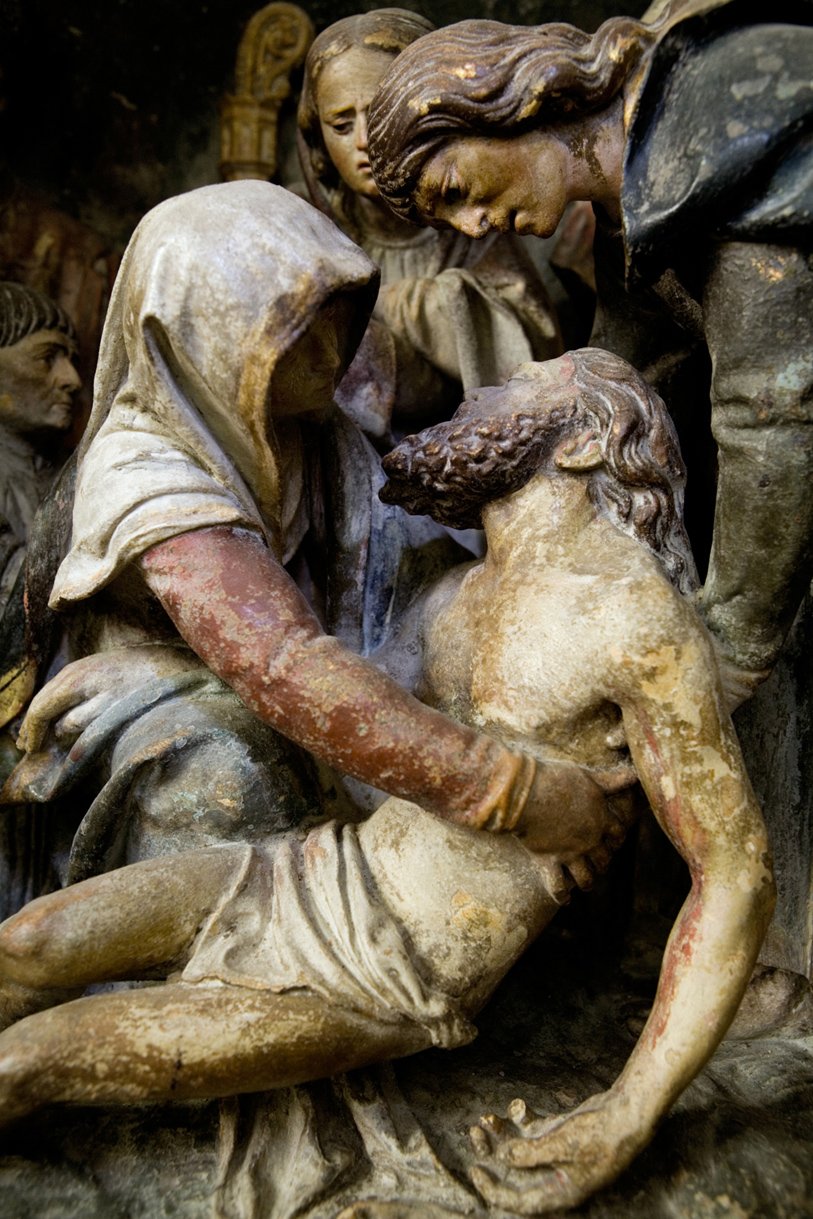
Part of Hattonchâtel altarpiece

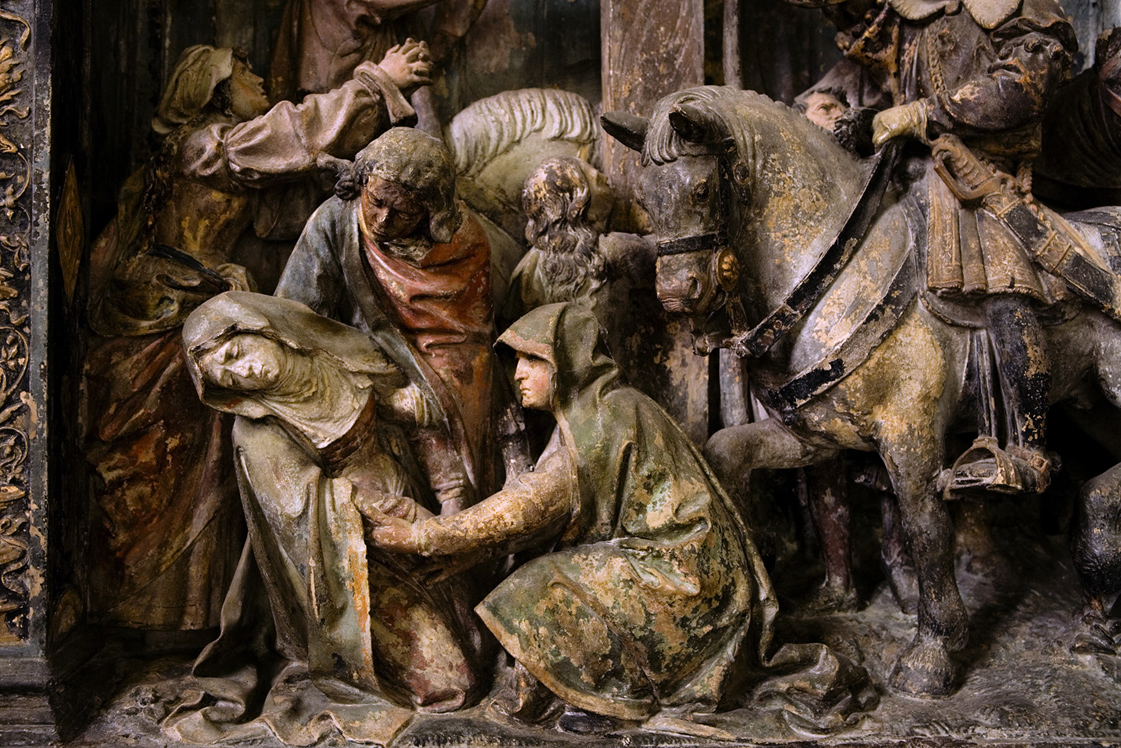
Part of Hattonchâtel altarpiece

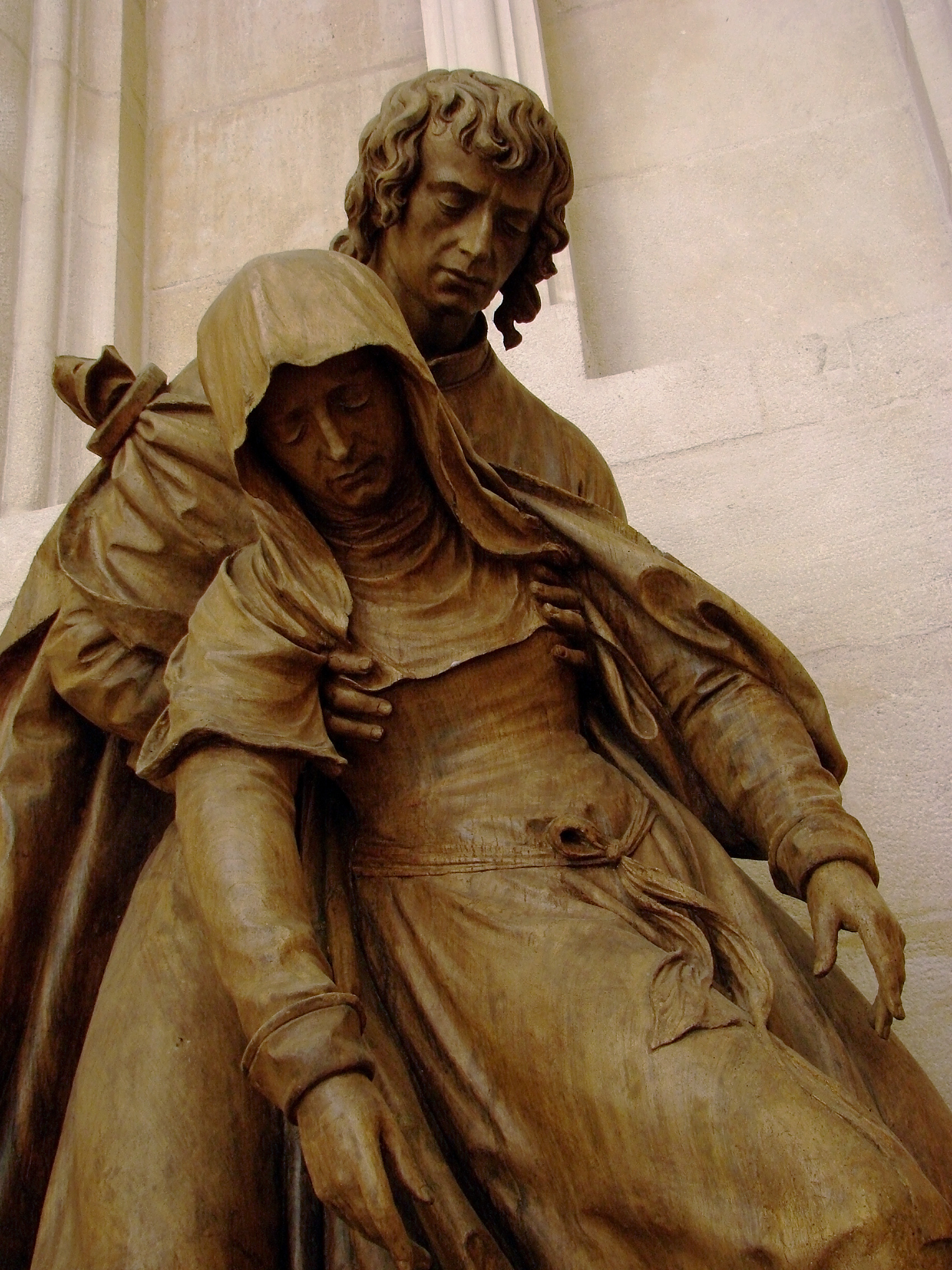
The Virgin Mary fainting. Carving in walnut dating to 1531 and in the Abbey of Saint-Michel in Saint-Mihiel.

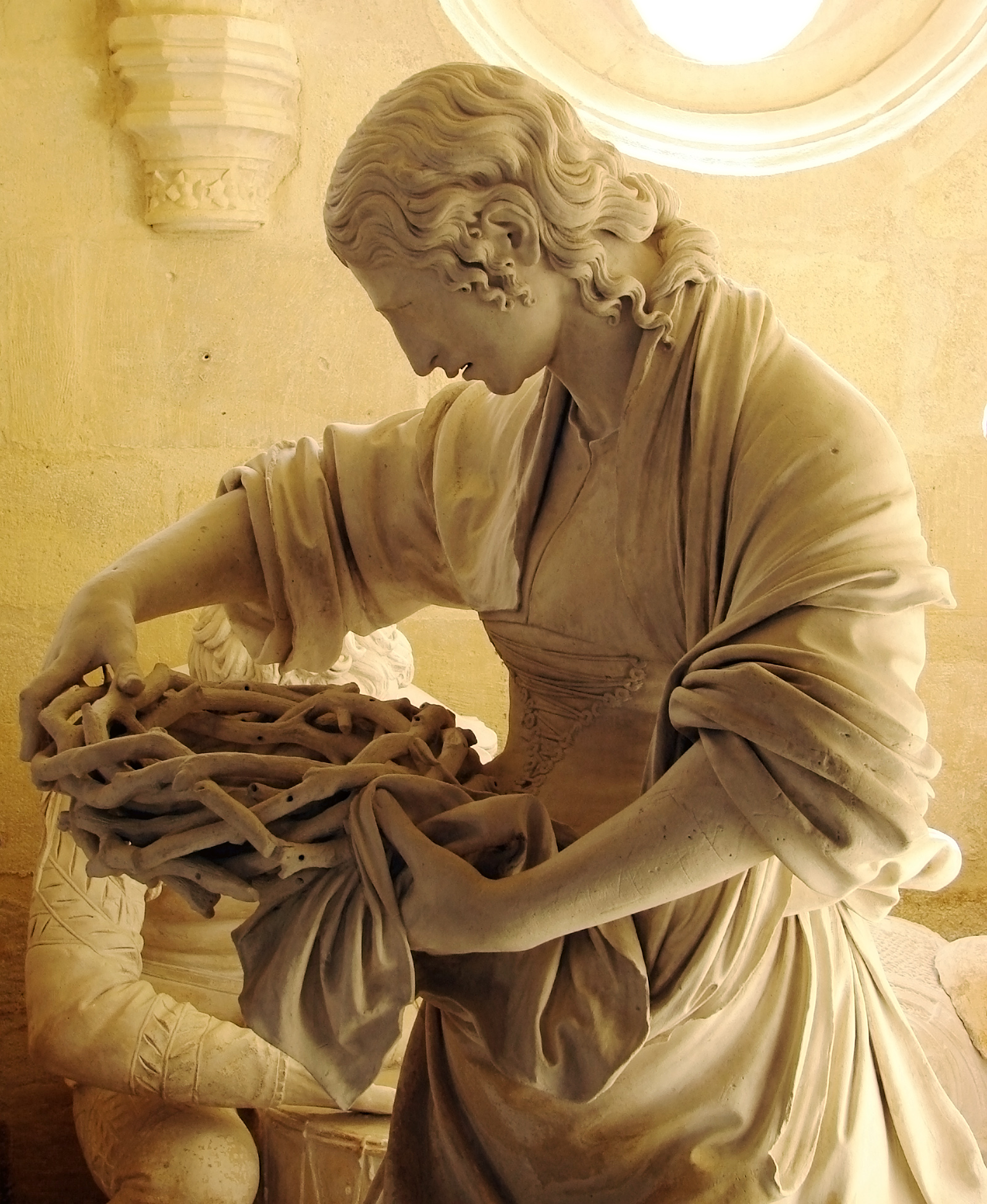
Part of the Saint Mihiel "mise au tombeau".

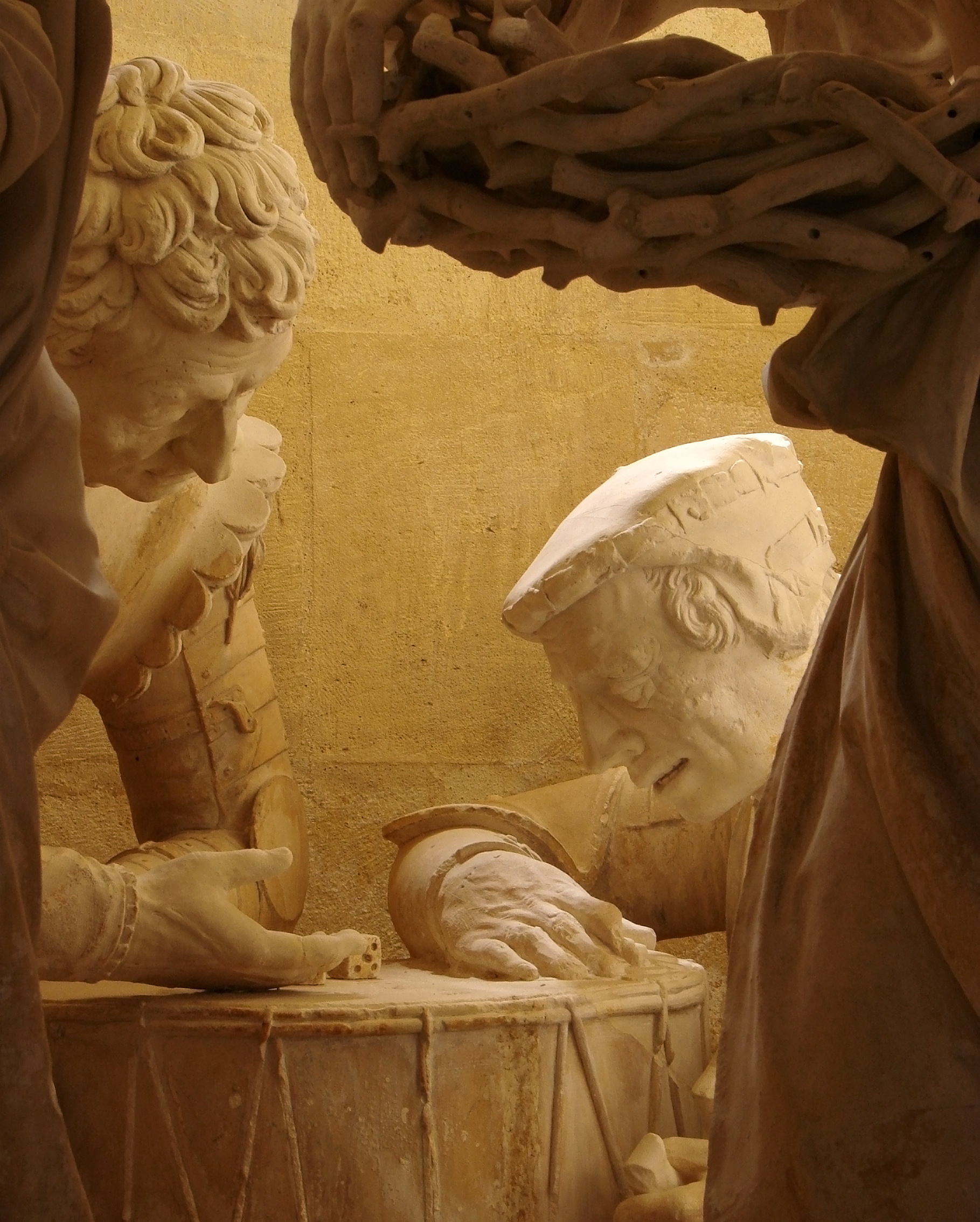
Two soldiers play dice. Part of the Saint Mihiel "mise au tombeau".

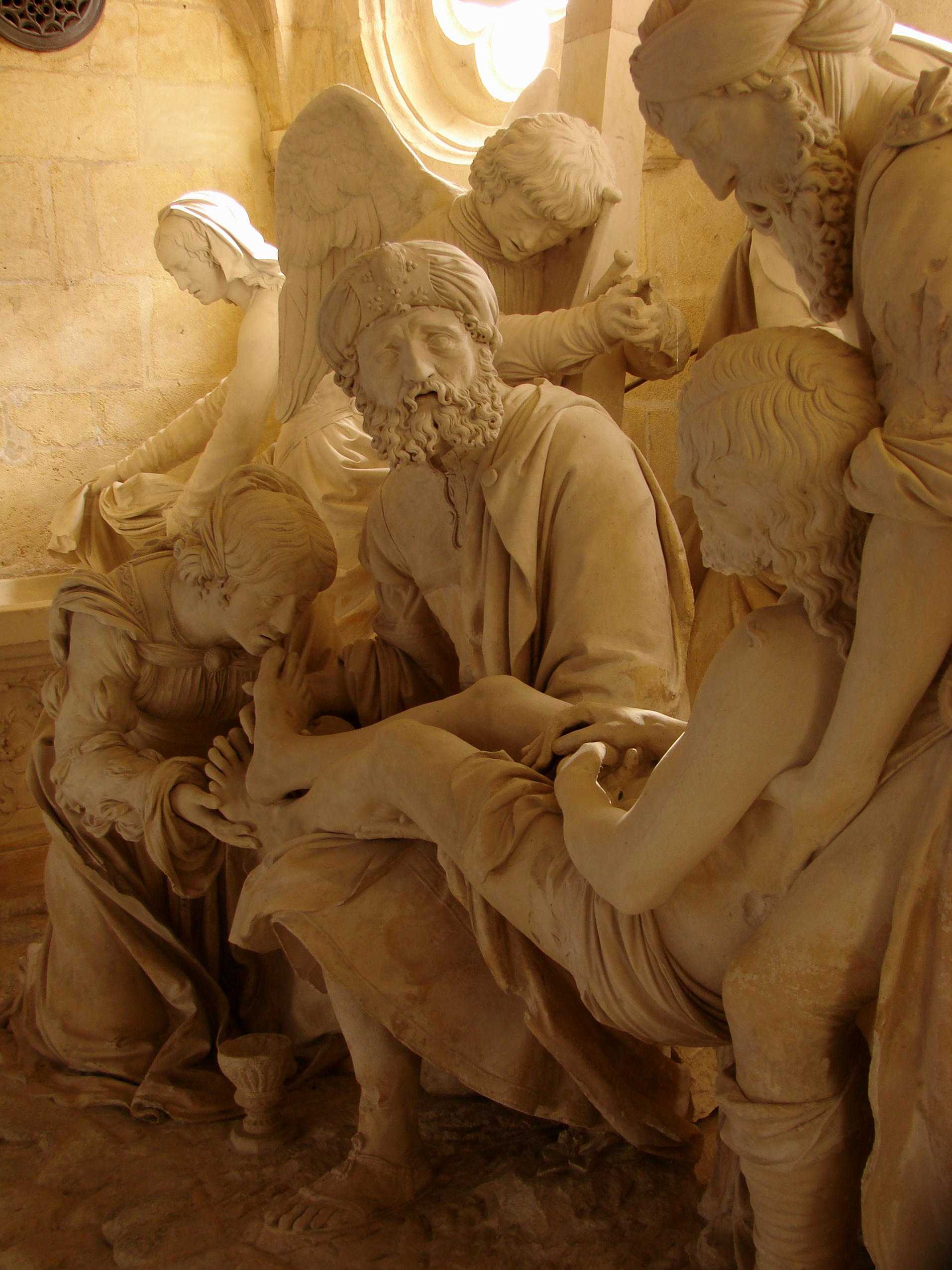
Part of the Saint Mihiel "mise au tombeau".

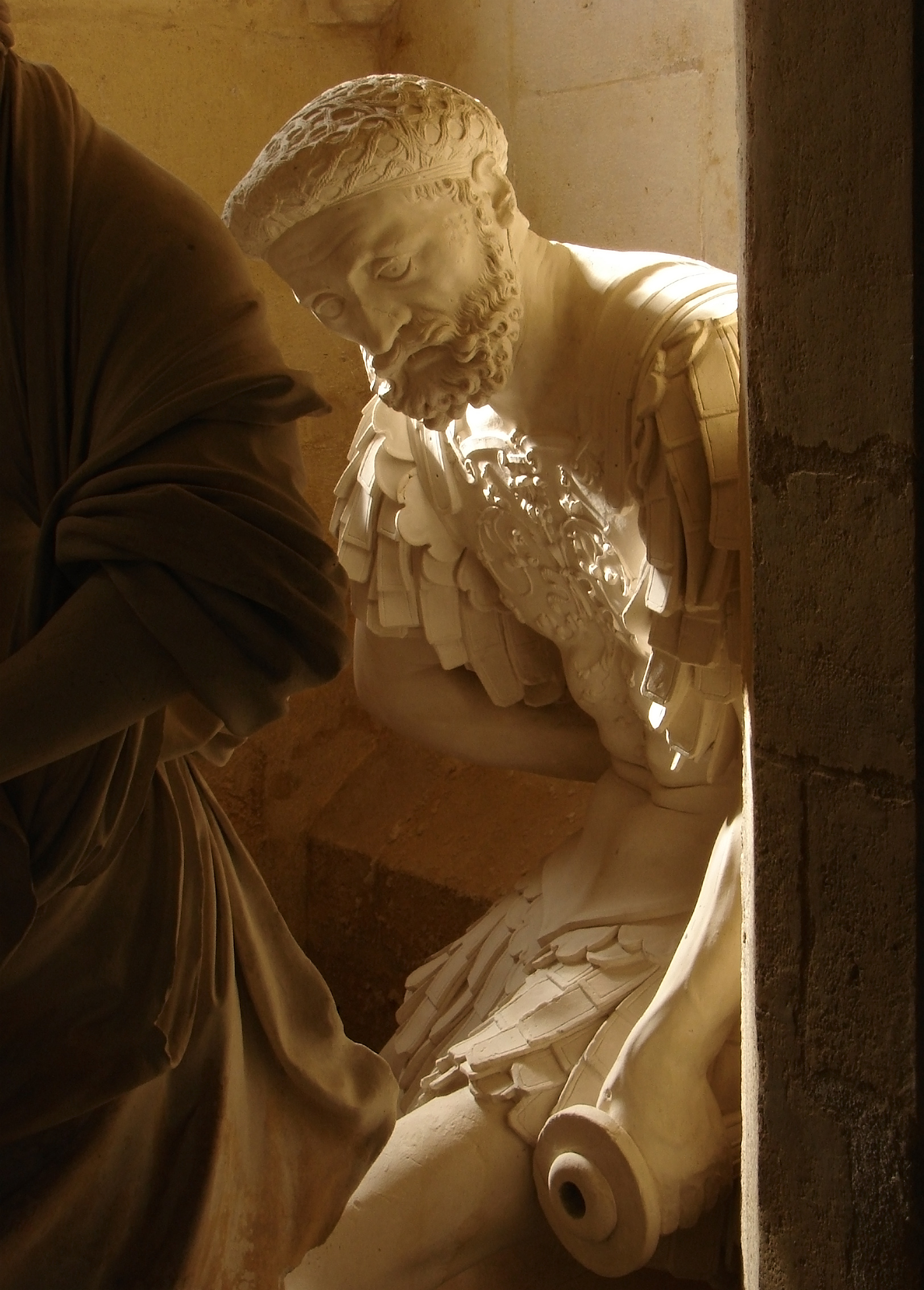
The centurion. Part of the Saint Mihiel "mise au tombeau".

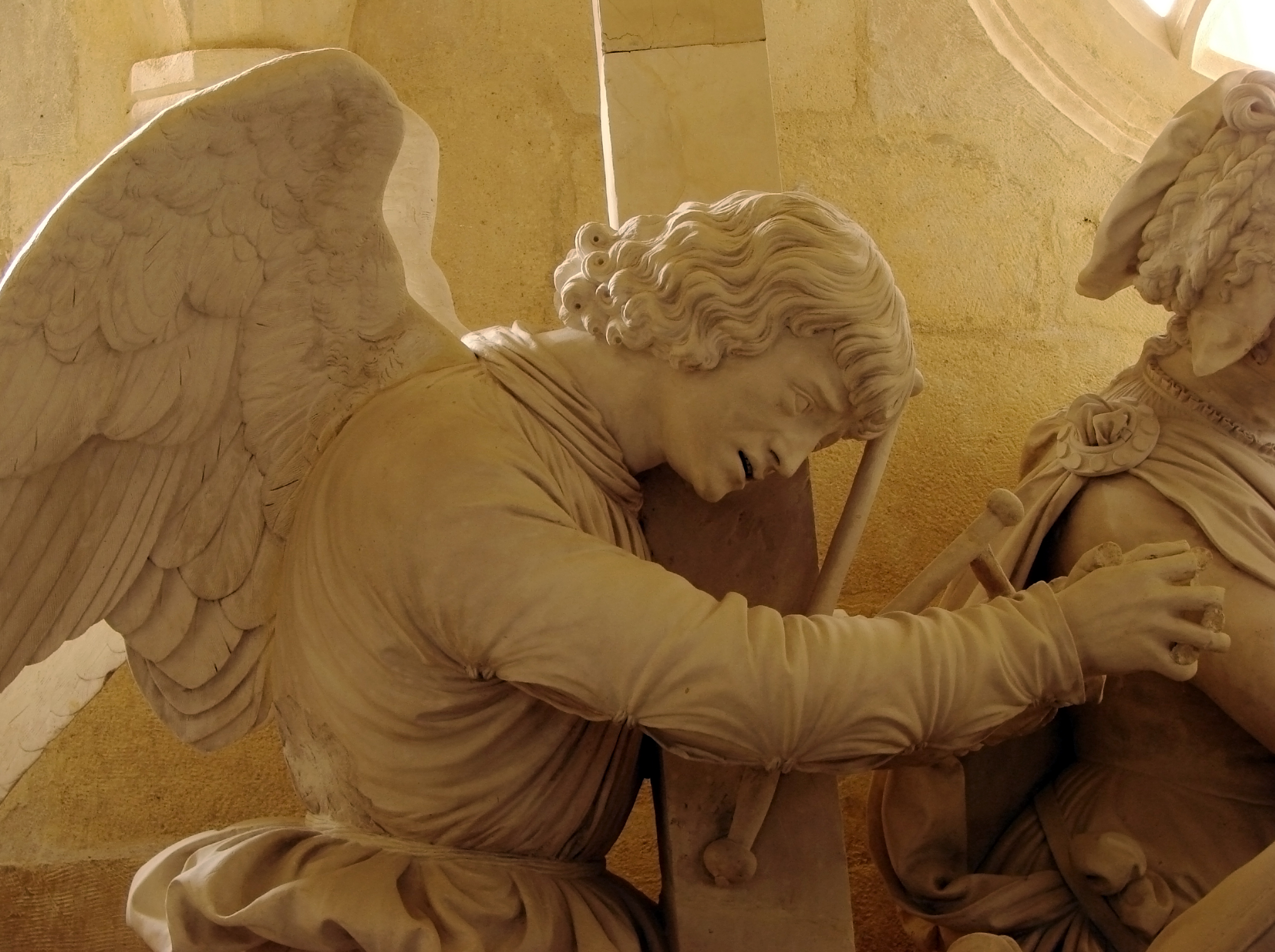
An angel with cross. Part of the Saint Mihiel "mise au tombeau".

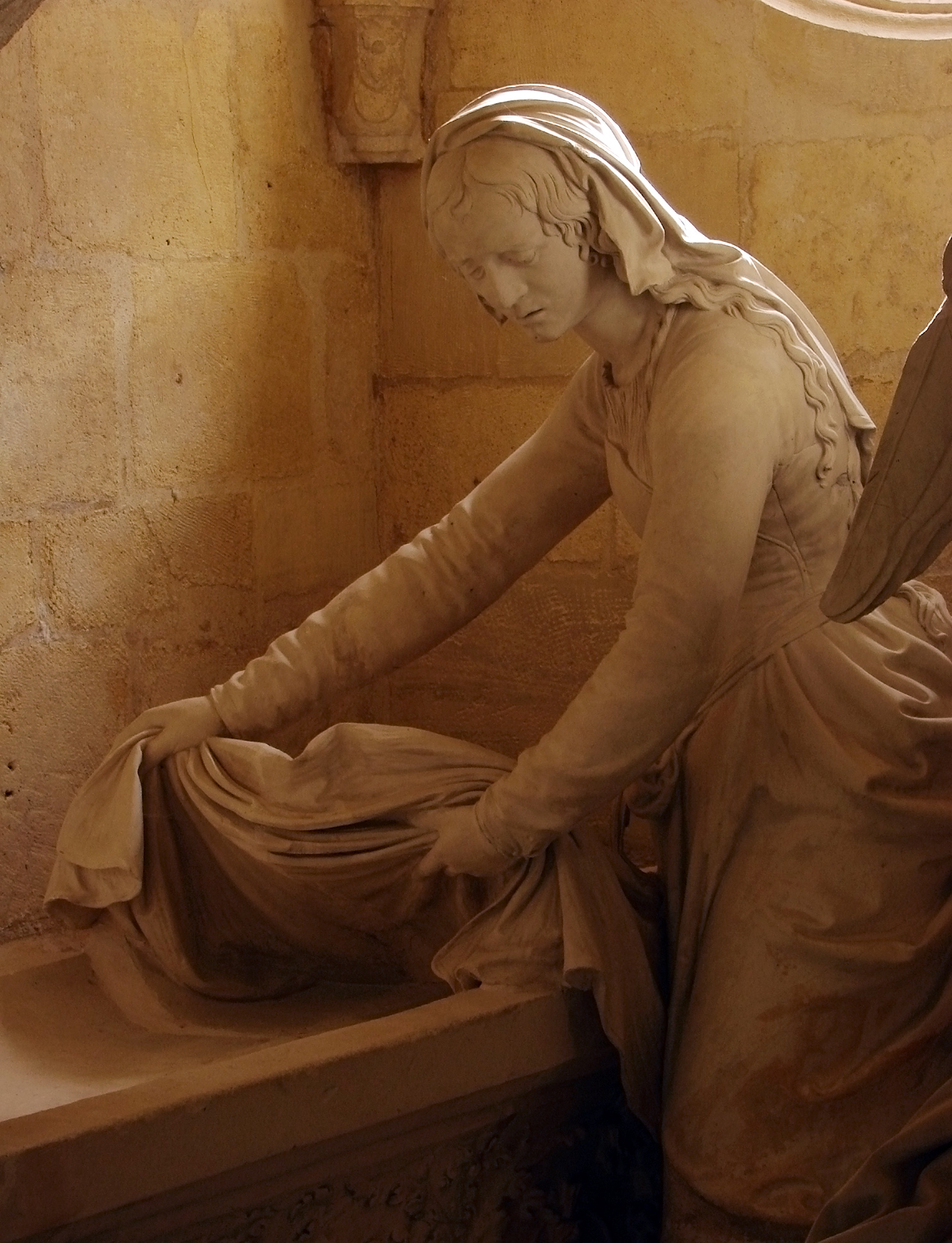
Salomé prepares Jesus' tomb. Part of the Saint Mihiel "mise au tombeau".

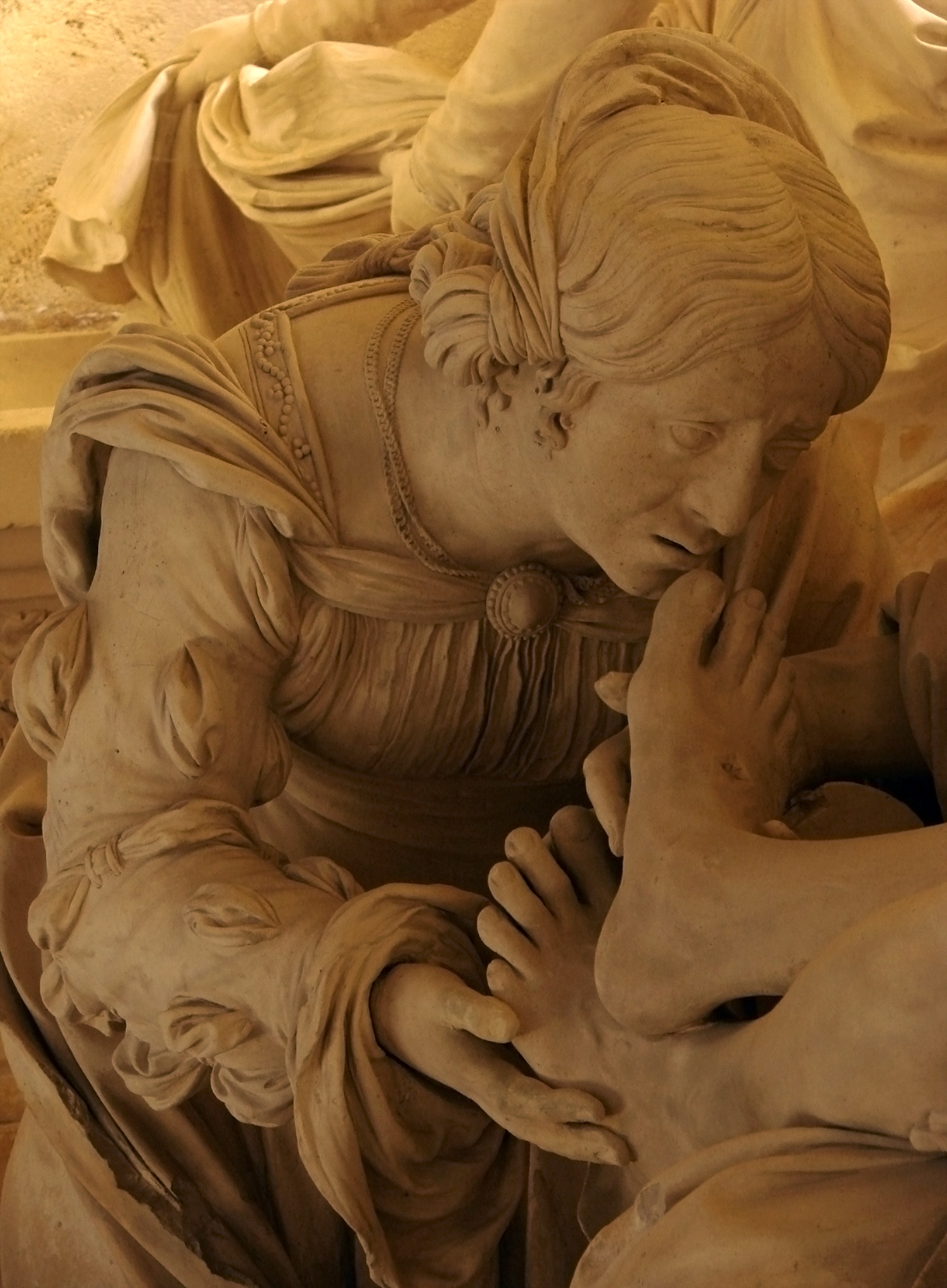
Mary Magdalene about to kiss Jesus Christ's feet. Part of the Saint Mihiel "mise au tombeau".

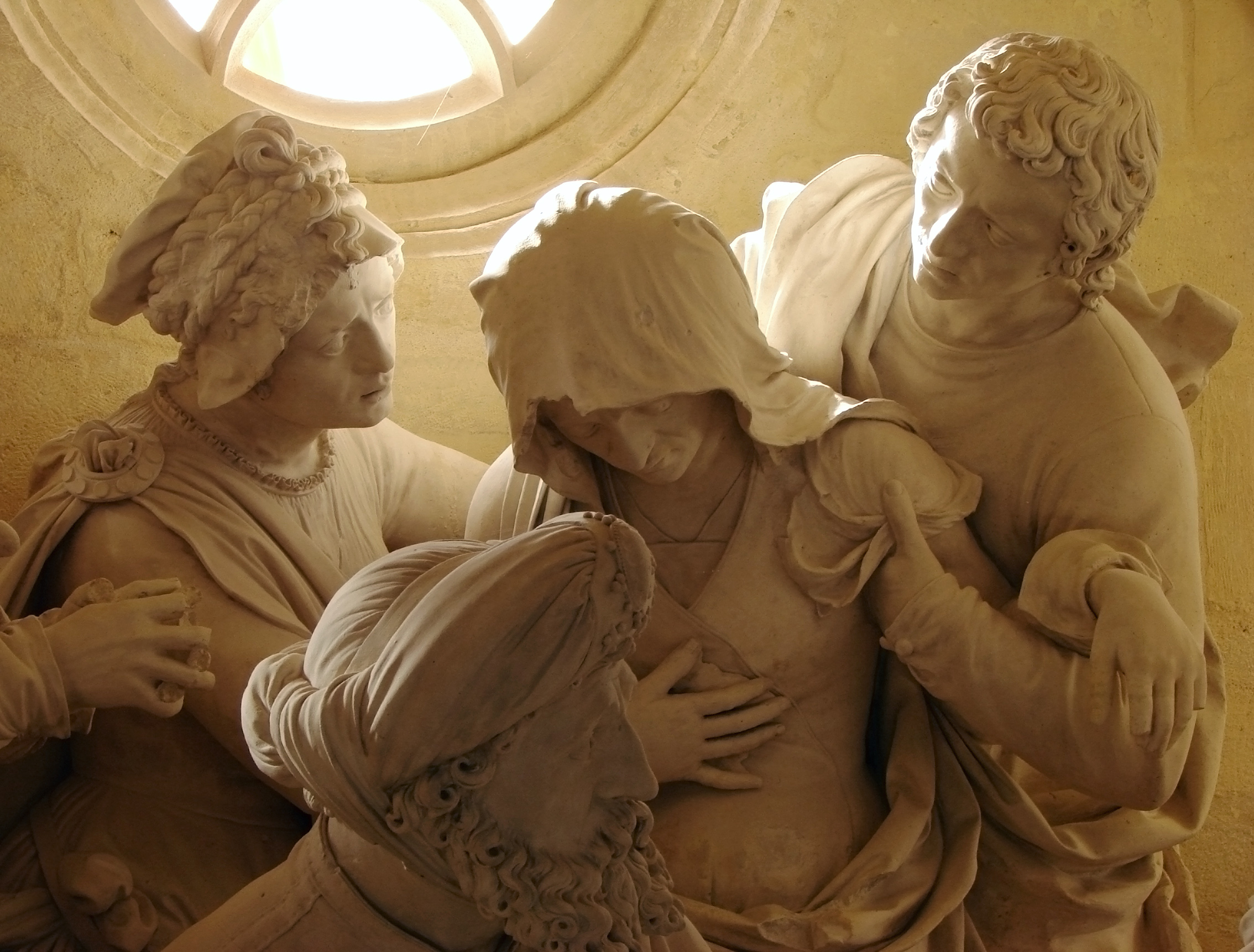
A distraught Virgin Mary is supported by St John and Marie Cléophée. Part of the Saint Mihiel "mise au tombeau".
