= Church of Nossa Senhora da Conceição Velha =

- (Old) Church of Our Lady of the Conception
- Igreja de Nossa Senhora da Conceição Velha

- Location of the church in the municipality of Lisbon
- 38°42′32″N 9°8′3″W
- Location: Lisbon, Greater Lisbon, Lisbon
- Country: Portugal
- Denomination: Roman Catholic

History
- Dedication: Nossa Senhora da Conceição

Architecture
- Architect: Francisco António Ferreira
- Style: Renaissance, Manueline, Gothic

Specifications
- Length: 24.42 m (80.1 ft)
- Width: 19.75 m (64.8 ft)

Administration
- Diocese: Diocese of Lisbon

The Church of Nossa Senhora da Conceição (Portuguese: Igreja de Nossa Senhora da Conceição Velha) is a church in the civil parish of Madalena, in the municipality of Lisbon.

The Church of Conceição dos Freires, or Conceição Velha, (known as the Church of the Misericórdia) was not included in the original plans to reconstruct the Lisbon riverfront, even though it was partially ruined. Instead, King Joseph gave the monks from the Church of Nossa Senhora da Conceição (which was destroyed) the location of the Misericórdia church, and ordered Pombaline architect Francisco António Ferreira (with the collaboration of Honorato José Correia) in 1770, to rebuild the structure. Once renovations were completed, the clerics of the Conceição, re-occupied the rebuilt Misericórdia Church, and the Brotherhood of the Misericórdia was transferred to the (formerly Jesuit) Church of São Roque.

Francisco António Ferreira, also known as o Cangalhas, reused the lateral entrance, central column, two Manueline windows, the relief of the Misericórdia, and Chapel of the Holy Sacrement, as the new entrance. With this, he reoriented the temple, whose southern entrance became the principal, and the lateral chapel became the presbytery. The main facade, crowned by triangular pediment, is marked by an ornate Manueline portico, with a tympanum that includes the Virgin of the Misericórdia, and figures of nobles and religious clerics. Flanked by comparable Manueline-style windows, the whole group has semblances to the Monastery of the Jerónimos.

== History ==
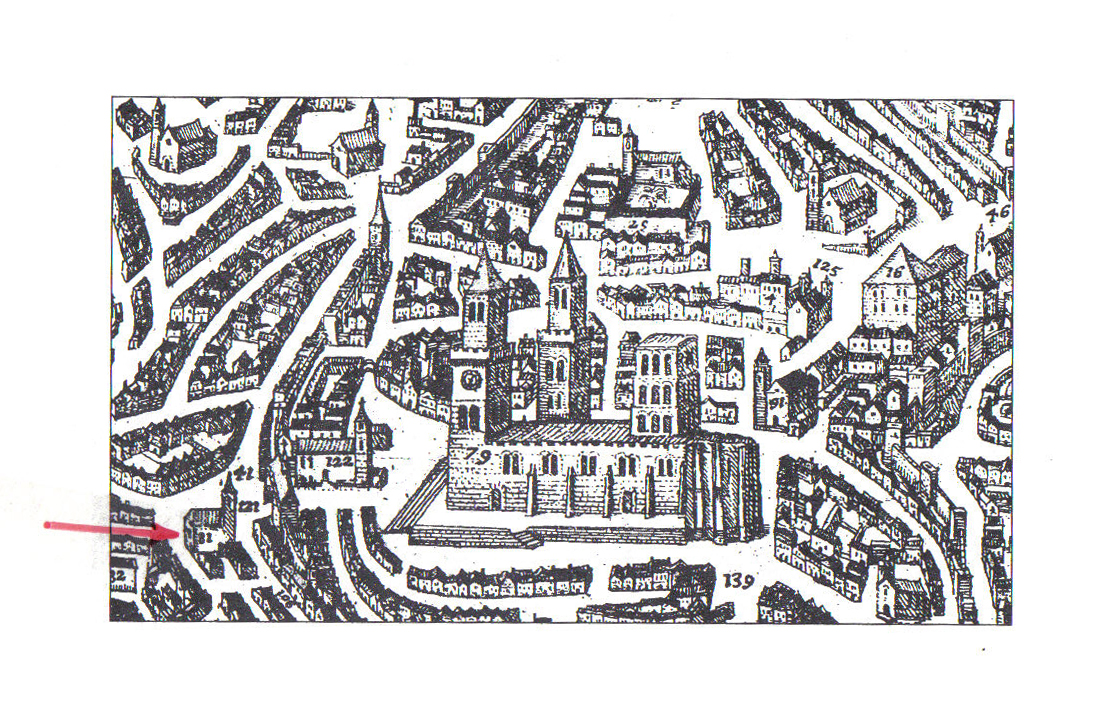
A 1598 sketch of the vicinity of the Lisbon Cathedral, identifying the Church of Nossa Senhora da Conceição Velha

In 1498, the Confraria da Misericórdia (Brotherhood of the Misericórdia) was instituted, under the initiative of Eleanor of Viseu and friar Miguel Contreiras (approved by King Manuel and confirmed by Pope Alexander VI). The new institution was transferred a chapel in the cloister of the Sé Cathedral of Lisbon. In 1502, after transferring the title of the Hermitage of Restelo to the Order of Saint Jerónimo, King Manuel traded to the Order of Christ the Casa da Judiaria Grande (Great House of the Jewry), a synagogue situated in Vila Nova (which was between Rua dos Fanqueiros and Rua da Madalena). The victorious Christians then rebuilt and consecrated the new church to Our Lady of the Conception (Portuguese: Nossa Senhora da Conceição), then known as the Church of the Conceição dos Freires, later known as the Conceição Velha (in deference to the Church of Nossa Senhora da Conceição Nova, which was built along the Rua Nova dos Ferros). At the time, it was called the Church of the Misercórdia.

In 1516, Manuel ordered the publication of a compromise with the Santa Irmandade da Misericórdia for the building of the church. At the time, the building was carved into stone with a vaulted ceiling decorated with regal and sacred emblems and supported by marble pillars, dividing the structure into three naves. The presbytery was located in the east, in line with the main portico (from plans and sketches dating from the 1755 earthquake). In the south was a door, flanked by sculpted pilasters and three windows (one on the left and the others on the right). The cornice was surmounted by a larger lintel, and on either side was a tower (the western one called Escrivaninha), all of which was detailed in the gravura de Leyden ("Leyden etchings"). Erected alongside the building was the Casa da Misericórdia, centre of the local hospital, orphanage, registry, house of the dispatch, offices and courtyard.

A letter from King John III dated 1533, permitted the construction of an entablature which the Church's ombudsman and the local Brotherhood of the Misericórdia had planned (and later had received consent from the municipal government for its construction). On 25 March 1534, this construction was completed, resulting in the Manueline-era entrance, and the installation of the Brotherhood, from an inscription that was hoisted on the north portico (today located in the Carmo Museum).

King Sebastian, with the endorsement of Cardinal Henry, established the ecclesiastical parish of Nossa Senhora da Conceição in 1568.

In 1576, the Misericórdia instituted the tradition of inscribing on the main porticos of its buildings, images of the Virgin Mary, with the Pope, Cardinal and Bishop to the right, along with clerics; while on the left, an image of the King, Queen and other representatives/dignitaries.

In 1594, the main portal was covered, with the addition of the orphanage, at the same time Simõa Godinho ordered the construction of a chapel, to be donated to the Misericórida, along with his earthly possessions.

A small doorway was opened in 1598 along the northern facade.

Documents from Lisbon in 1626, described an aromatic spice and flower market on the southern staircase. During this year, another double archway was opened, which included an image of Nossa Senhora do Pópulo (Our Lady of the People).

A 1659 Lisbon plan, illustrated by João Nunes Tinoco, depicts a narrow churchyard fronting the south facade.

During the second half of the 17th century, an organ was executed under the direction of Father Francisco de Santo António. In August 1670 the altarpiece was ordered for the church by the Misericórdia's ombudsman, the Marquess of Marialva, the first to use twisted columns in the city of Lisbon.

In 1684, a new collection/orphanage was established in the east wing of the church.

Father Agostinho de Santa Maria, writing in 1721, indicated that the "old" south gate, with double arches, had a grande arch with the image of Nossa Senhora da Misericórdia. In 1729, the presbytery roof was painted by Brás de Oliveira Velho and António Pimenta Rolim.

On 1 November 1755, the Lisbon earthquake partially destroyed the Church, resulting in the destruction of part of the vaulted-ceiling and a belfry over the lateral doorway. A fire, which was triggered after the event, consumed the orphanage, except the chapel of the Holy Sacrament (the former Chapel of D. Simôa), and altarpiece of the Chapel of the Holy Christ of Padecentes. The church of Conceição dos Freiras was also ruined, making its reconstruction non-viable owing to the new city plan.

In 1768, from a letter of D. José, the Brotherhood of the Misericórdia, installed themselves in the Church of São Roque, which became vacant after the expulsion of the Jesuits.

The former-Church of the Misericórdia was then reconstructed with a new orientation, reusing the materials and some of the structures, under the direction of Francisco António Ferreira and Honorato José Correia in 1770. The chapel of the Holy Sacrament was transformed into presbytery, and the south portico was transformed into the principal doorway, resulting in a re-orientation of the nave along a north to south access. The nuns of the Order of Christ, transferred to the new church following its reconstruction, bringing with them the patron saint, Nossa Senhora da Conceição and its denomination of Conceição Velha. At the end of the 18th century, the stone group of the tympanum was encased in glass and illuminated.

Sometime between 1818 and 1880, the historical of the Misericórdia was removed and substituted for a grated window; the figure was moved to chapel with appropriate altar, that was painted and gilded. By 1834, the religious orders were abandoned and the church uninhabited. Around 1837, the church was under threat of being sold, to be destroyed and replaced with commercial/residential buildings.

In 1880, the Brotherhood of Leigos, which managed the church completed a public restoration of the sculptures in the tympanum, cleaning the paint that covered the figures.

=== Republic ===
Between 1936 and 1940, the vicar and Brotherhood of Santa Cruz dos Passos, informed the public of the necessity of completing restoration work on the church and its annexes, due to water infiltration, that was ruining the coverings, corners, stucco and wood frames. The groups solicited the DGEMN Direcção-Geral de Edifícios e Monumentos Nacionais (General-Directorate for Buildings and National Monuments) in order to make the necessary repairs; the DGEMN first intervened in 1938, with the repair of the gutter and the raising of the front walkway to the church. This was followed in 1942 by the repair of the steps and railings to the altars; the replacement of the wood floors, stone and tiles; the cleaning of the building's exterior stonework; and plastering joints.

These suggestions were followed in 1946–47, by similar calls by the Brotherhood, referring to the deterioration of the main portal and sacristy. In addition, there were references to deteriorating windows, falling stucco from the vaulted-ceiling and degradation of the skylight in the choir. But, even as the DGEMN intervened in 1947, the church's condition worsened the following year, with rainfall that invaded the church, and a broken pipe in the sacristy, that resulted in the rotting of the wood floors that had to be replaced.

In 1952, there was an inventory of the images in the Church: at the time there existed 40 figures in wood and stone, located in various niches and altars in the sub-choir, nave, presbytery and dependent annexes. Considering the condition of the structure, it was determined that the organ, should be removed from the site and installed in the Church of Freixo de Espada-à-Cinta. But, still, water infiltration and humidity continued to degrade the pavement and stonework of the presbytery. In 1954, the tiles were repaired, which included the consolidation and painting of the Chapel of Senhor dos Passos, repair of the walls, ceilings and access corridor towards the Rua dos Bacalhoeiros. Similar repairs were completed in 1955, including the painting of the doors, re-plastering the interior and exterior surfaces, and new wood floors in the sacristy. The roof was repaired between 1965 and 1967. Yet, in 1959, the Prior denounced the state of degradation in the sacristy, the access corridor towards the Rua dos Bacalhoeiros and the floor in the presbytery. The DGEMN, then, substituted the wood floor in the presbytery for stone; resurfaced the walls of the corridor access and sacristy's vestibule; oil painted the doors, panels and ceilings; cleaned the arcade; and painted the walls with water-based paints and an insulator.

Ten years later, there was a need for a technical visit, owing to rainfall seepage in various locations throughout the church.

The building was fully connected to the electrical grid in 1964. In 1966, there was a revision of the interior plastering, repair and conservation of the principal doorways. Later, in 1968, with a drive to make the building "fire safe", the exterior door was restored; a new assessment of the electrical installations was completed; installation of fire extinguishers; and the cleaning, removal of dust and bird feces was completed, and the building was resealed with silicone where needed. There was a partial renovation of the electrical installations in 1969; re-touches of the plaster, filling of cracks and repair of joints, as well as the installation of a sound system.

In 1970, the skylight was repaired; improvements made to the electrical system were made in order to install a projector; reconstruction of the wood structures and stuccoing of the ceilings; construction of hydraulic rigging and screed in the pavement; painting of the walls with water-based paints. There was a proposal by the LNEC and IJF to study the area in order to treat the deteriorating stonework at the end of the 1970s. But, in 1978, the facade panel was partially destroyed through the restoration attempts of the IJF. By the end of 1979, there was a further reassessment of the roofing in the registry, altar and lateral chapels for repairs; demolition and reconstruction of the framework and pavement of the lateral chapels; substitution and assessment of the zinc eaves troughs and flaps; and repair and cleaning of the roof.

In 1980, 1981 and 1982, there were further repairs to the ceiling of the presbytery and staircase of the choir; substitution of the zinc flap edges and tile flooring. In 1980, the LNEC realized a study of the stone, for signs of degradation based on physical, chemical and petrographic assessments. These investigations were followed, in 1983, by conservation and cleaning of the facade, using hydraulic hoses to remove the dirt, accompanied by hard-bristle brushes and soft sponges. In 1984, the DGEMN, demolished and reconstructed the firewall with plaster and whitewash; chipping away the plaster facade and replacing it with new plaster of mortar, whitewashing the completed surface; repair and replacement of the pavement of the choir; replacement of the ceiling plaster, paint and window grills; varnishing the doors; substitution of glass; cracks and joints were grouted in the facade, with new stone replacing older rock, which was removed and replaced.

In 1986, there were repairs to the roof and the cleaning of gutters and downspouts.

On 8 April 1998, a map of risks was elaborated by the DGEMN, in order to assess the condition of the property.

On 22 August 2006, feedback from the DRCLisboa indicated their willingness to the classify the church as a Zona Especial de Proteção (Special Zone of Protection) along with the Castle of São Jorge, and remainder of Lisbon's historical walls, the Pombaline Lower Town, and several other properties already classified within the church's vicinity.

The Conselho Nacional de Cultura (National Council on Culture) proposed that the definition be shelved on 10 October 2011. A dispatch from the director of the IGESPAR a week later (18 October) agreed with the feedback, and requested new definitions be elaborated for the ZEP.

== Architecture ==
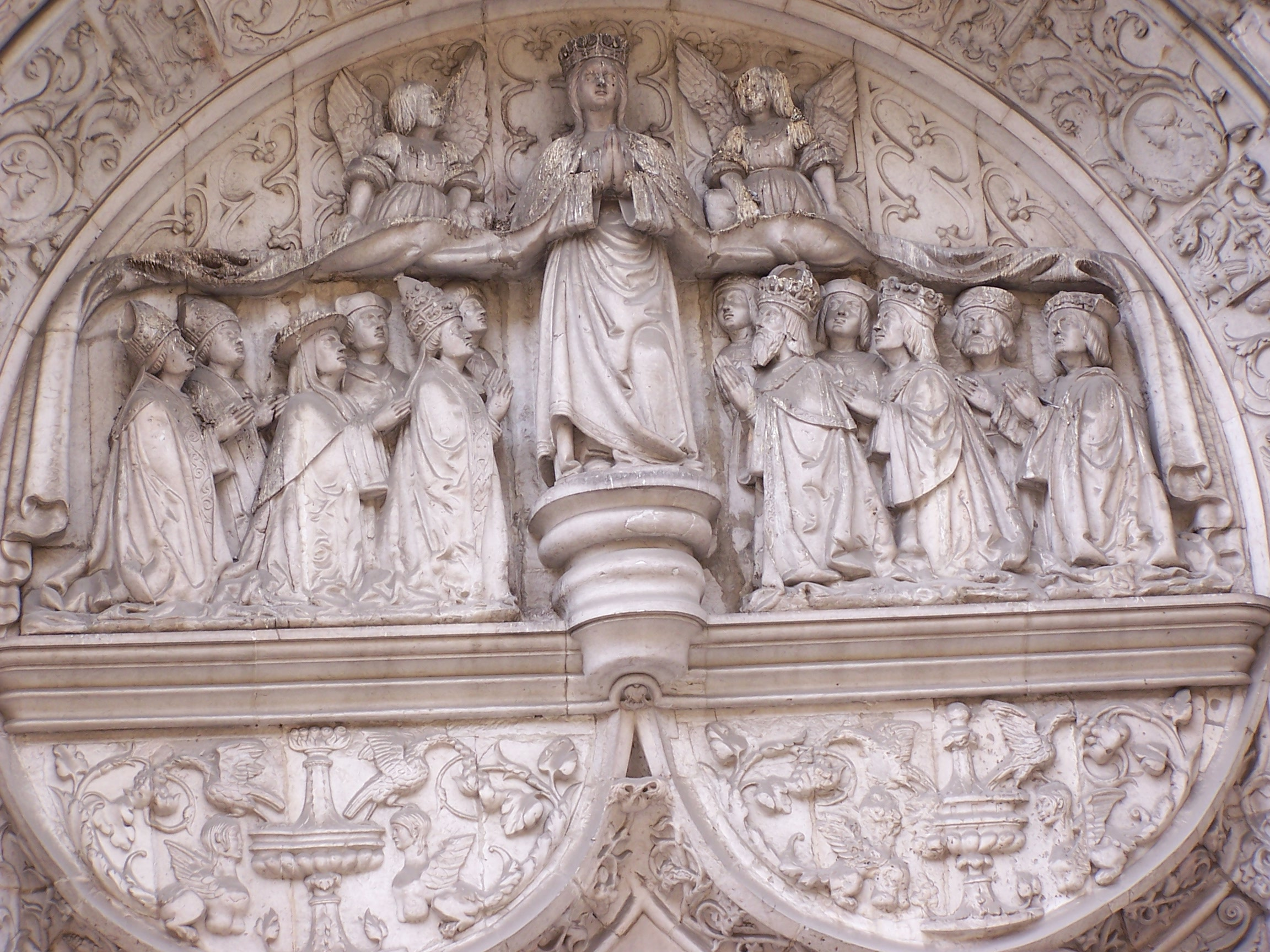
Detail from the tympanum, showing the signette of the Misericórdia

The church is located in the "ravine" area of the Pombaline Lower Town, flanked by buildings of comparable height and facing the street. It is implanted with close to many of comparable historic buildings and monuments, such as the Sé Cathedral of Lisbon, Casa dos Bicos and Praça do Comércio. The primitive church was located in this location, was the second largest Manueline temple in Lisbon, only second to the Monastery of Santa Maria de Belém (the Jerónimos).

=== Exterior ===
The church consists of two juxtapositioned rectangular spaces, comprising a single nave and presbytery, with sacristy abutting, storage spaces, lateral courts and corridor. The horizontal articulated volumes and differently covered with tile. The frontispiece, which faces the south, consists of corner pilasters crowned by a triangular pediment, with a tympanum marked by elliptic oculus. The portico is framed by Manueline decoration, with double arched doors with niche, framed by relief pilasters, ornamentally decorated, with the sculptures of the Anjo da Anunciação (Angel of the Annuciation) and Virgem (Mary) in niche, united by Roman arch and flourishes in the jambs. Above this is a lintel, surmounted by two armillary spheres and cross of the Order of Christ. In the tympanum, in low relief is the figure of Nossa Senhora da Misericórdia (Our Lady of the Misericórdia). Lateral windows, framed by segmented columns, complete the facade, with a lot of decoration, including images of the saints.

The Manueline elements concentrated on the principal facade are reconstructed from the ruins of the lateral (south) facade of the Church of the Misericórdia, destroyed during the 1755 Lisbon earthquake, and were re-used for this project. Primarily, these elements were the decorations in the internal faces of the portico (the urns, medallions, masks, cornucopias, fantastical animals, sphinxes and birds), the vegetal forms (leaves, flowers) and zoomorphic elements (birds, dragons and dogs).

==== Portico ====
The portico is marked by two sculpted pilasters, comprising a large arch, surmounted by a slim canopy, containing two minor arches of the same profile. Rising from a simple base, but multifaceted barrel, the pilasters are tri-faceted, with by middle-relief decoration and statuary. In the internal faces, include six kneeling cherubs facing the doorways. Meanwhile, in the exterior facetes there are various decorative elements, that include urns, fantastical animals, heads of angels, badges, cornucopias, medallions and other stylized vegetal elements, dominated by two niches on either side. These two niches, with corbels and canopies, contain figures of the Angel Gabriel (on the right) and the Virgin Mary (on the left), with the pilasters above the niches, semi-circular and striated, extending into pinnacles, surmounted by armillary spheres. These pilasters are united above the main portico, by a line of vegetal decoration that frames the periphery of the doorway.

The outside of the main arch is decorated with rolling phytomorphic acanthus, which rise to the center forming a small canopy with the royal coat-of-arms, crowned with a garland and strut cross of the Order of Christ, dividing the capstone. The internal archivolt, is carved with flourishes of vegetal elements that extend to the base of the inner archivolt.

The double-arch is delimited externally by columns and rectangular frames, and decorated with phytomorphic motifs. The pillar dividing the two arches includes a small niche with the image of Justiça, or alternately, the Archangel Michael, holding a scale in his right arm and sword in his left, and decorated with geometric shapes.

The tympanum has two registers. On the first there are two inverted semi-circles with decorations (urns, cornucopias and animal figures). Tangent to the arches of the doorways are medallions with classical bust, while on the periphery there are relief imagery. The second register, semi-circular, holds a sculptured group of figures that represents the classical Misericórdia symbol, or Mater Omnium, over a frieze with elevated platform consisting of semi-circular dietes. On this platform is the Virgin Mary, secured by two angels, over figures representing Pope Alexander VI, Father Miguel Contreiras, a bishop and cardinal (all on the right), and Queen Eleonor, King Manuel and two prelated (on the left).

The windows that flank the portico also follow the same motifs, decorated in vegetal motifs, with pillars that extend to pinnacles and surmounted by a flower. The lateral pillars are candelabra in nature, sculpted with ropes and vegetal elements, over bases decorated with zoomorphic and vegetal elements, and frieze of foliage. In each jamb is a niche, with vegetal corbels and zoomorphic lintels, with the images of Santo André and São Tiago (on the right) and São Bartolomeu and São Jerónimo (on the left).

=== Interior ===
The singular nave consists of a high-choir over stone pillars, a sillar of marble azulejo tile and stucco vaulted-ceiling. In addition, there is a baptistery, to the left of the altar, six lateral chapels and raised pulpit to the left of the altar. The concave chapels are designed within a Roman arch, and include gilded retables, are all covered in vegetal elements. The last altar, deeper than the rest, includes imagery from the Last Supper and a ceiling painting of the Holy Spirit. A fence of wood separates the chapels from the rest of the nave.

The vaulted-ceiling roof is painted with the Triumph of Our Lady of the Conception (Triunfo de Nossa Senhora da Conceição), and includes molded and framed elements, as well as the signet of the Virgin Mary. This figurative and symbolic ceiling, in blue, gold and ocre, depicts figures of an angel with lance killing a dragon over a globe. The Virgin is located over a lunar crescent, crowned by stars, being blessed by God, with clouds and the heads of angels filling in the rest. The main scene is framed by architectural motifs, heads of angels selectively placed in the cardinal directions, and arches forming an architectural frieze. Outside the medallion is decorated by florians, with their centres opened to vegetable motifs (mainly leaves), with the area above the presbytery the most decorated. Here there is an inscribed "M" and crown. Between the arches are other representations: an angel with a scale in his right hand, and sword in the other; angels with flowers; angels with trumpets; the sun; and an angel guarding a thurible in its right hand, with flores surrounding the group.

The three-story symmetrical altar and presbytery wall is marked by a triumphal Roman arch with pediment accessing the altar, flanked on either side by doors, two niches (with the images of Saint Peter and Saint Paul respectively) and, similarly, two windows with guardrails. Generally, the form of the presbytery has an architectural form; its design is dictated by an exterior form, which were hallmarks of many of the works of Jerónimo de Ruão, much like the presbytery of the Jerónimos Monastery.

The presbytery has rhythmic marble walls with pilasters, surmounted by a vaulted-ceiling, with painted panels, guarding a gilded retable and altar with the image of Our Lady of the Conception.

The rectangular sacristy, which is accessed from the northern narrow corridor, is abutted by a rectangular courtyard.

The azulejos, an ornamental composition, forms the sillar in the church, consisting of bi-chromatic (cobalt blue and manganese on white). Usually nine azulejo tiles in height, the decorations include vegetal imagery (mostly flowers and/or foliage).

== Gallery ==
Manueline portal of the Church of Nossa Senhora da Conceição Velha. The sculpted tympanum depicts Our Lady of Mercy sheltering several Portuguese figures from the early 16th century under her mantle

Nave looking towards the chancel

Chancel with the image of Our Lady of the Immaculate Conception on the high altar

Side altars and pulpit

Side altars with paintings and an image of Christ carrying the cross

Nave vault with stucco decoration and a central relief showing an angel lancing a dragon, the Virgin Mary and God surrounded by cherubs
