= Annales Portucalenses Veteres =

Medieval annals

The Annales Portucalenses Veteres (APV, in Portuguese: Anais Portugueses Velhos) are a set of related historiographical compositions preserved in five testimonies. Most of these testimonies begin with a list of kings, the Laterculus regum Ouetensium ad Adefonsum II (Laterculus of the kings of Asturias up to Alfonso II), followed by annalistic entries referring to the conquests of Coimbra and Montemor-o-Velho by Almanzor, and the occupation of the Portuguese territories by Ferdinand the Great. From then on, the testimonies convey different series of events. For this reason, three versions are identified according to the date of their last report: 1079, 1111, or 1168.

The name Annales Portucalenses Veteres was introduced in 1947 by Pierre David. The similarities between the texts led David and other specialists to include these versions in the same set, although the researchers differ in how they believe the versions relate to each other, giving rise to various theories about their transmission. The main point of divergence is the version ad annum 1079 (up to the year 1079), considered by some to be the oldest and by others to be the most recent. There is another text, the Chronica Gothorum, related to the latter version.

== Versions ==
=== ad annum 1079 ===
The only testimony of this version can be found in the Livro da Noa, which originated from the monastery of Santa Cruz of Coimbra, and was copied in the mid-14th century. It contains nineteen entries, thirteen of which are unique to this version, mainly referring to noble families from the County of Portucale and to kings Bermudo III, Ferdinand the Great, and Alfonso VI of León.

=== ad annum 1111 ===
This version, the shortest of the three, contains eleven entries. It essentially covers the main actions of Kings Ferdinand the Great and Alfonso VI regarding the occupation of the Portuguese territories. There are also references to events with an Iberian impact, such as the conquest of Toledo and the Battle of Zalaca, during the reign of Alfonso VI.

The oldest evidence of this version can be found in Porto's Municipal Public Library. It is part of a homiliary completed in 1139, which also originated in the Monastery of Santa Cruz.

There is a second testimony preserved in the Marqués de Valdecilla Library at the Complutense University of Madrid, copied after 1250. It follows the table of contents and shares with it the recto of the first written folio. A final entry has been added to this copy, again recording in more detail the conquest of Coimbra by Ferdinand the Great. Based on this testimony, both Enrique Flórez and Alexandre Herculano published the text, as Chronicon Complutense and Chronicon Complutense siue Alcobacense respectively.

There was another manuscript, similar to this one, in the Monastery of Alcobaça, which was lost before 1632. We have knowledge of it from the notes of João Vaseu and António Brandão.

=== ad annum 1168 ===
Covering a longer period than the other two versions and transmitting twenty-three entries, the version ad annum 1168 includes the same events for the period 1079–1111 as the previous one, although narrated differently. It continues the list of events until 1168, the year in which Geraldo Geraldes occupied Badajoz, focusing essentially on the reign of King Afonso Henriques. At the end, it includes an entry on the conquests of Alfonso III of Asturias in the Portuguese territories.

Its oldest testimony, found in the first quire of the Livro da Noa, dates from the 12th century. Although it also begins with a list of the kings of Asturias up to Alfonso II, it is abbreviated, reaching only the reign of Pelagius.

A second testimony can be found in the Lamego Cathedral Martyrology and Obituary. It does not have the initial laterculus, but instead includes an Ordo Annorum Mundi (Order of the Years of the World) summarized, the Annales Martyrum (Annals of the Martyrs), and an entry on the birth of King Afonso Henriques.

=== Chronica Gothorum ===
We also know of another text related to the APV, the Chronica Gothorum (Chronicle of the Goths) or Annales domni Alfonsi Portugalensium regis (Annals of Alfonso, King of the Portucalenses), which also begins with a list of the kings of Asturias (in this case up to Alfonso III) and then contains entries relating it to the version ad annum 1079, focusing after that on the reign of the first King of Portugal.

== Theories about the transmission of the APV ==
As has been said, the versions ad annum 1111 and ad annum 1168 appear in manuscripts from the 12th century and are similar to each other. For this reason, all researchers have agreed to place them in chronological sequence. The version ad annum 1079, on the other hand, although it is the one in which the last recorded date is the oldest, is also the version whose known copy is more recent (14th century), raising doubts as to whether it is the closest to the original or the most distant. If it is the oldest version, the others would have voluntarily abridged its contents, while if it is the most recent, it has a strong influence from other sources.

Pierre David considered the versions ad annum 1111 and ad annum 1079 to be two recensions (short and long, respectively) of the same lost text, and the version ad annum 1168 to be a continuation of ad annum 1111. He also placed the beginning of the Chronica Gothorum, as it is very similar to the version ad annum 1079, as another testimony to the long recension of the APV.

For José Mattoso, Luís Krus, and Mário Gouveia, the three versions follow one another in the chronological order of their last entry, with additions made to incorporate new events. They considered that there had been an original, finalized in 1079, made in the monastery of Santo Tirso de Riba de Ave, related to the lineage of Maia, as it is mentioned in the version ad annum 1079. This original was reworked in two recensions (brief and long) in the monastery of São Salvador de Grijó (until 1111), and these two recensions were reworked again in Santa Cruz de Coimbra (until 1168). None of these texts correspond to the ones that have come down to us, serving only as models: the Chronica Gothorum would be made from the two long recensions and the original, the version ad annum 1079 only from the latter, and the other two versions would come from the short recensions ending in their respective years.

Later, Francisco Bautista proposed that the original version of the APVs was ad annum 1111, not only because it was the oldest copy but also because all of its events were set in a peninsular context, although they appear in the text mainly in relation to the Portuguese territory. The version ad annum 1168 would be a reworking of the previous one, already of a markedly Portuguese character, with a reduced version of the Laterculus of the kings of Asturias and the recording of events related to King Afonso Henriques. Consequently, the version ad annum 1079 would be the most recent, having been made as preparatory material for the Chronica Gothorum, which is why it includes information from other sources.

Finally, Rodrigo Furtado draws attention to the process of increasing and reducing entries present in all the texts, hypothesizing that they are all a reformulation of a lost original. He also notes that the dates have changed: in the oldest version we have (ad annum 1111), the saints' days appear according to the Mozarabic calendar, while the other two follow the Roman calendar. For these reasons, he believes that the original (with the Mozarabic dates) was reformulated to produce the version ad annum 1111 and another, now lost, with the Roman dates. The version ad annum 1168 would have been made from these two, while the ad annum 1079 would have used the Roman version and other sources.
