= Livro da Noa =

Portuguese medieval codex from Santa Cruz

Page from the Livro da Noa

The Livro da Noa is a medieval codex that originated in the monastery of Santa Cruz de Coimbra and is now preserved in the Torre do Tombo National Arquive. The present volume results from the separate binding, in the 17th century, of the last five quires of a psalter containing the prayers of the Nones, from which it took its name. It was also known as the 'Book of the Eras' and the 'Book of the Sacristy'. It contains a collection of short texts, mostly historiographical, which were copied at different times: the earliest ones around 1200, others in the 14th century, and the latest in the 15th century.

The codex consists of 26 parchment folios, numbered 2-27 and grouped into five quires: a binion (folios 2-5), a quaternion (folios 6-13), an incomplete ternion (folios 14-18), and an incomplete quinion (folios 19-27). The first quire dates from the late 12th or early 13th century and was probably a quaternion that, in the 14th century, lost its last folios. The contents of these folios, or part of them, were copied into the second quire. The psalter, of which it was a part, contained the seven penitential psalms. Its last five quires were separated at an imprecise date and were considered lost until 1623, when the cleric José de Cristo found them with the relics of the monastery and bound them.

== Composition ==
Records and compositions that were probably spread over several volumes were transferred to the Livro da Noa at different times, likely to prevent them from being lost. These texts include three versions of the Annales Portucalenses Veteres, the Annales Martyrum, the Ordo Annorum Mundi and an obituary of the bishops of Coimbra, as well as several series of annals.

== Editions ==
The texts that make up the Livro da Noa have been copied, in whole or in part, since the 15th century, and published in printed form by António Caetano de Sousa, Enrique Flórez, Alexandre Herculano, Alfredo Pimenta, Pierre David, and António Cruz.
