= Nicolas Chantereine =

French sculptor and architect

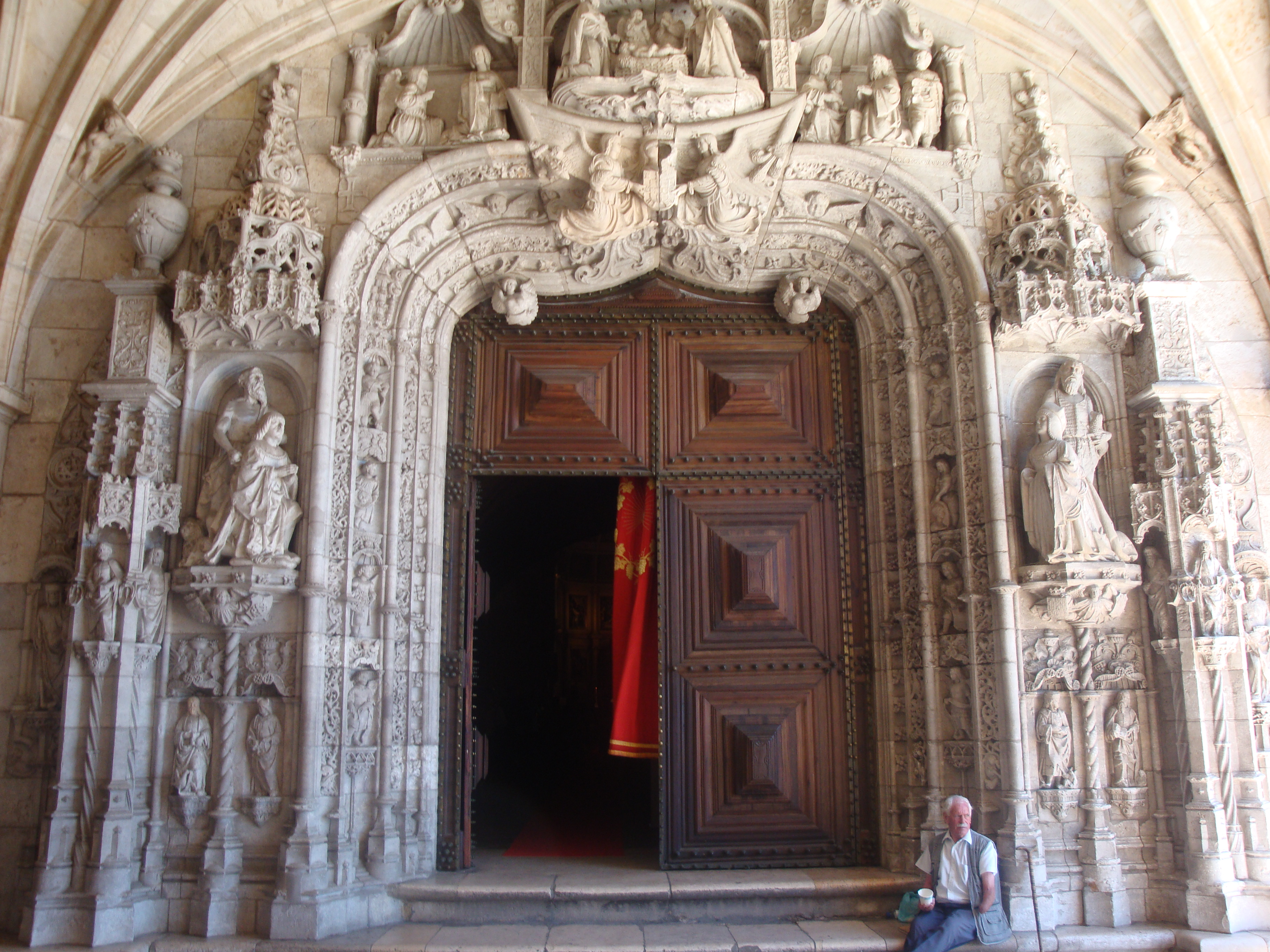
Jerónimos Monastery's Western portal, transition from the Gothic style to Renaissance, by Nicolas Chantereine, 1517

Nicolau Chantereine (also called Nicolas Chanterenne or Nicolas de Chanterenne) (c.1485–1551) was a French sculptor and architect who worked mainly in Portugal and Spain.

It is assumed that he was born in Normandy, France. It is not clear whether he was trained in France or Italy. However his style is essentially French, notwithstanding his use of Lombard ornaments.

== Santiago de Compostela (1511–1516) ==
Chanterene is first mentioned in a document in Santiago de Compostela that states that a payment was made to him for carving 15 of the 16 life-size statues between 13 August 1511 and 1513 in the columns of the transept of the Hospital Real (Hostal de Los Reyes Católicos founded in 1492). These statues introduce influences from the Italian Renaissance in Galicia.

== Belém (1517–1518) ==
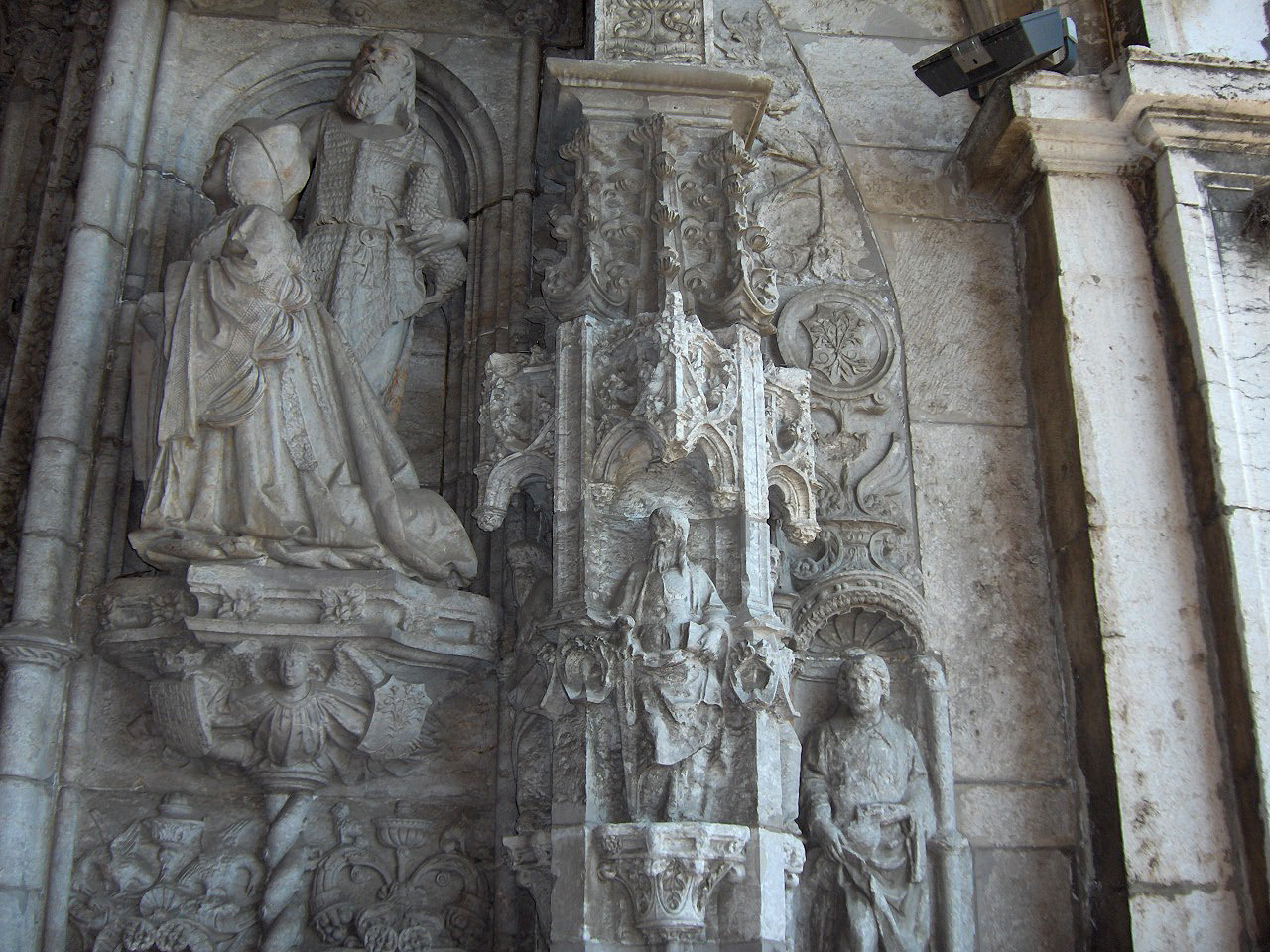
The kneeling queen Maria of Aragon western portal of the Jerónimos Monastery in Belém

By January 1517, he and an assistant were at work as master contractors at the western portal of the Jerónimos Monastery in Belém. This was probably his first assignment in Portugal. When he arrived, the supporting corbels had already been decorated in Late Gothic style with small angels holding the coat-of-arms and, at the side of the king, an armillary sphere and, at the side of the queen, three blooming twigs.

He filled the splays on each side of the portal with statues, among them king Manuel I and his second wife Maria of Aragón, both kneeling in a niche under a lavishly decorated baldachin. They are flanked by their patron saints St. Jerome and John the Baptist. He then decorated the tympanum with the Annunciation, the Nativity, and the Epiphany, each scene set in a tiny niche. Two angels, holdings the arms of Portugal, close the archivolt.

== Coimbra (1518–1527) ==
Chanterene left in 1518 to Coimbra, another one of the main artistic centres of Portugal in the Age of Discovery. He would work there at the renovation of the Augustinian Santa Cruz Monastery, beside Diogo Pires the Younger and under the direction of Diogo de Castilho.

His reputation grew so that in 1519 king Manuel I appointed him his personal sculptor (Imaginario de Pedraria) with the accompanying pension and privileges. He was by then considered as the most important sculptor of what was to be called “The School of Coimbra”, consisting of Jean de Rouen (João de Ruão), Jacques Buxe, Philippe Houdart, Diogo Francisco, Pero Anes, Diogo Fernandes, João Fernandes, João de Castilho and Diogo de Castilho.

His first sculptural work were the tombs, at both sides of the main altar, of the first two Portuguese kings, Afonso I and his successor, Sancho I. The kings lie on their tombs, clad in full armour, with hands joined in prayer and a lion or dog (symbol of fidelity) at their feet. Their serene expression is such that they seem asleep. The tombs are set in large niches richly decorated with statues, flowers and medallions in Late Gothic and Early Renaissance style, with on top the crosses of the Order of Christ.

Tomb of Afonso I of Portugal in Coimbra

The weathered statues of the Apostles and Doctors of the Church in the portal, made between 1522 and 1525, were carved by Nicolau Chanterene and Jean de Rouen. They are the most emblematic piece of the whole monastic ensemble, harmonising the artistic elements of the Manueline style with other features from Renaissance inspiration.

The ornate, polygonal pulpit (1521) in the private chapel of the monastery is considered a masterwork of Chanterene. Around the seated Doctors of the Church are niches, baldachins, pilasters and entablatures.

In 1520, together with Diogo de Castilho, he sculpted the Renaissance portal of the Santa Cruz Monastery in Coimbra. These life-size statues are now badly damaged.

In 1522 he was commissioned for a retable in Ançã limestone (a local limestone) for the Monastery of São Marcos de Tentúgal (near Coimbra). He depicts, just as in the Belém portal, the kneeling figures of the donors, but this time in Renaissance style. He probably only sculpted the principal figures: chief justice Aires Gomes da Silva and his wife Guiomar de Castro. The figures in the “Deposition of Christ” were modelled by him in clay, leaving the carving to his assistants.

In 1526 he was promoted by king João III to the honorary title of royal herald. In the same year, he sculpted the arch over the door between the cloister and the chapter house of the Mosteiro de Celas in Coimbra.

The damaged retable in the Renaissance chapel of St. Peter in the Old Cathedral of Coimbra is also attributed to Chanterene. (sometimes to Jean de Rouen). The central theme of the elegant decorations and carvings is Quo vadis (Where are you going?).

== Lisbon (1527–1533) ==
King João III probably brought Chanterene with him to his court in Lisbon, Portugal, in 1527. He came in contact with the new artistic developments in Europe by studying architectural treatises and imported engravings. This manifests itself in the marble and alabaster retable of the chapel Nossa Senhora da Pena in the Pena National Palace in Sintra. It is generally recognized as his finest work through its composition and the exquisite carving, show first signs of Mannerism.

== Évora (1533–1551) ==
From 1533, he stayed at the court in Évora, entering in daily contact with noblemen, humanists, such as André de Resende, and the highest ecclesiastical ranks.

In 1537, he sculpted the alabaster tomb for the archbishop of Évora, Dom Afonso de Portugal, and the marble grave of D. Duarte da Costa, governor of Brazil, both now on display at the museum of Évora.

The design of the church of Nossa Senhora da Graça in Évora in 1542 is also ascribed to Nicholau Chanterene and Miguel Arruda.

He died in Évora.

== Conclusion ==
In the evolution of his works can be seen the changes that occurred in the arts in Spain and Portugal in the first half of the 16th century. Breaking a centuries-long tradition, he would rather associate with scholars and humanists, than with artists belonging to his own craft.

His influence on Portuguese sculpture is limited, as he did not have a permanent workshop. However he had some influence as can be seen in the works of the sculptors Jean de Rouen and Diogo Pires the Younger.
