= Restelo Hermitage =

Hermitage of Restelo
- Ermida de Restelo
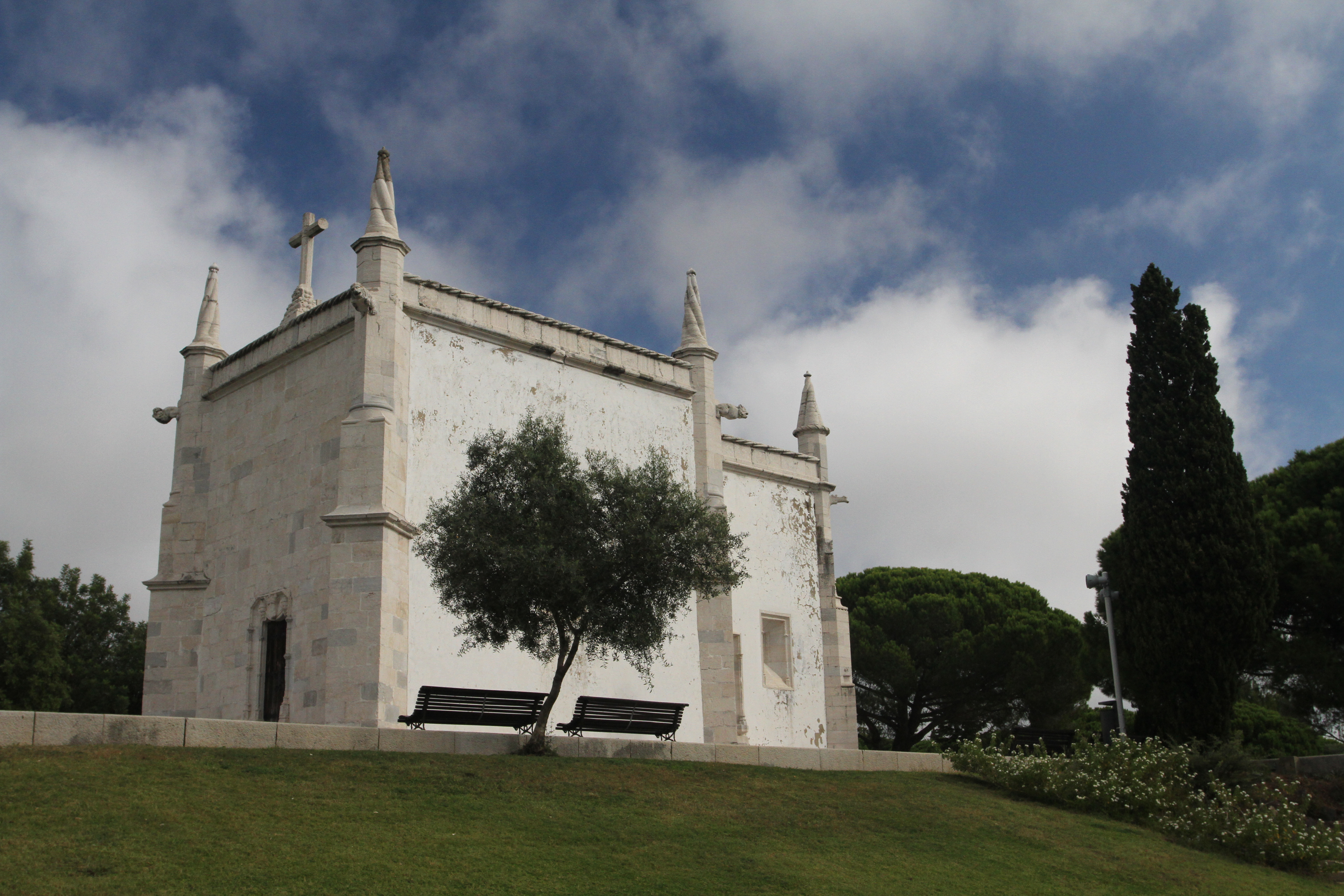
- The lateral profile of the Chapel of São Jerónimo

- Location within Lisbon

General information
- Type: Hermitage
- Location: Santa Maria de Belém, Lisbon, Portugal
- Coordinates: 38°42′4.80″N 9°12′49.35″W
- Opened: c. 1496
- Owner: Portuguese Republic

Technical details
- Material: Limestone

Design and construction
- Architect: Rodrigo Afonso

The Hermitage of Restelo (Portuguese: Ermida de Restelo), alternately Chapel of Saint Jerome (Portuguese: Capela de São Jerónimo), is a hermitage in the civil parish of Santa Maria de Belém, in the municipality of Lisbon. The religious architecture has Manueline and revivalist Neo-manueline elements, consisting of a single-nave structure with a vaulted ceiling and surrounded by a modernist landscape, as evidenced by a preoccupation with choice of plants and manicured environment (completed by Gonçalo Ribeiro), in order to create a zone of protection for the hermitage.

== History ==
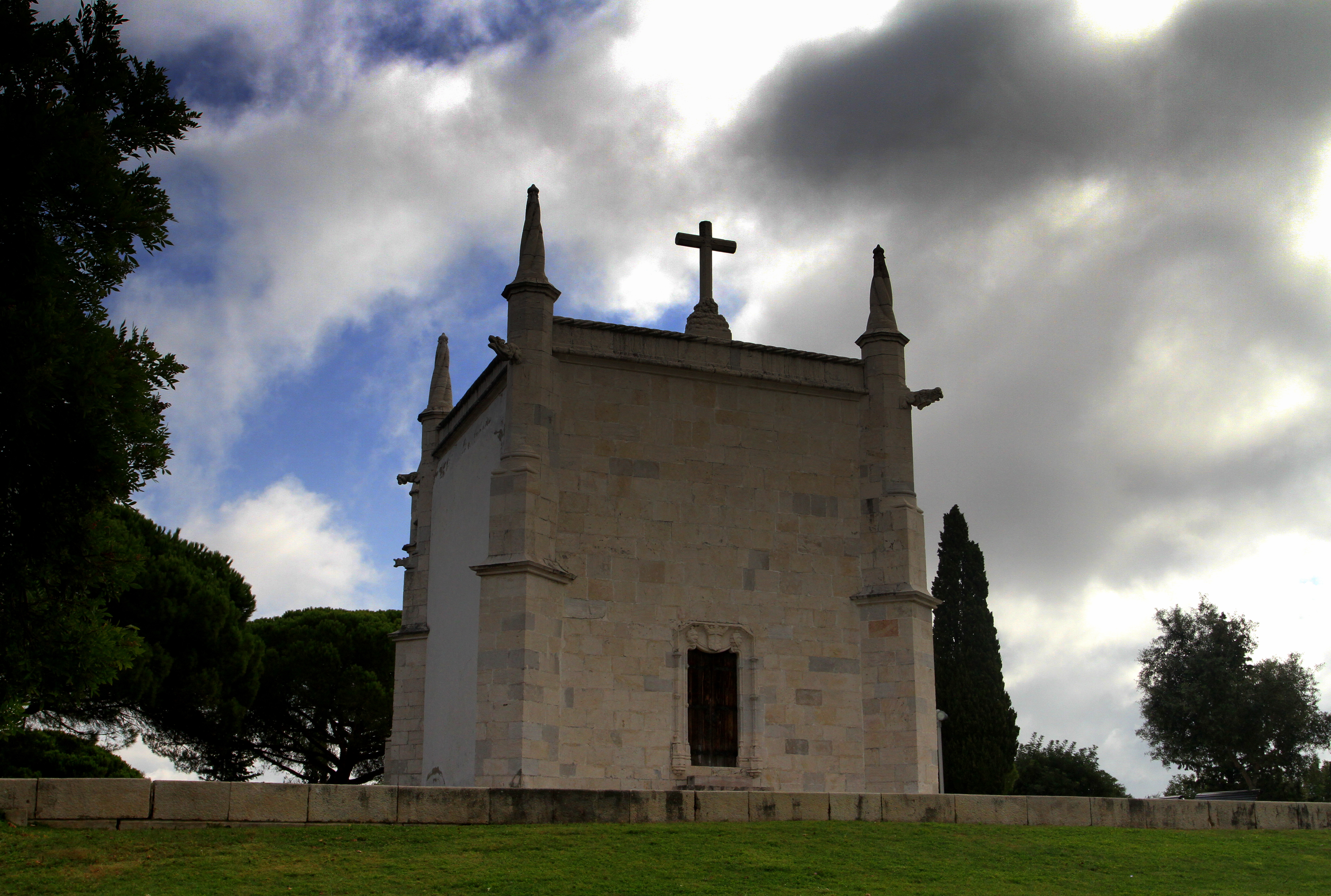
The front facade of the hermitage, with main entrance, cross and pilaster-like buttresses with gargoyles

The Hermitage of Restelo (Portuguese: Ermida do Restelo) was already in disrepair when Vasco da Gama and his men spent the night in prayer there before departing on their expedition to the Orient in 1497. The canonical foundations of the Monastery of Santa Maria de Belém were established in 1496 at the hermitage, which belonged to the Order of Christ. Two years later, the buildings were donated by royal proclamation to the Order of Saint Jerome, which occupied them in 1499.

Between 1513 and 1545, King Manuel I acquired lands and buildings for the new monastery in Belém. On 20 March 1514, the first round of construction began with the excavation, transport, and assembly of the stonework to build the Church of Santa Maria de Belém. The first blocks arrived in 1516, and were immediately used to define the churchyard and build the foundations of the structure. In 1517 a new chapel was constructed within the limits of the monastery, which then consisted of a group of hermitages (of which only the Chapel of Santo Cristo remains), for the retreat and meditation of the monks. Diogo Rodrigues, the supervisor and receiver-general for the project, paid Rodrigo Afonso 1,500 Portuguese réis for work completed on the Church of Saint Jerome.

In a 1572 engraving in the Atlas de Georgius Braun Agrippinensis the chapel is shown with a longer form, and flanked by buttresses, with three windows and covered in tile. In 1833, the Monastery of Santa Maria de Belém was closed, and all its dependencies were occupied by the Casa Pia. The Abbot António Dâmaso de Castro e Sousa referred to the chapel covered in "stone lacework". In 1886, an inscription date was affixed to the doorway of the apse, indicating its being opened in that year after completion of remodelling work to the property for public use. Sometime between 1895 and 1924, the lateral altars, originally covered in azulejo tile, were removed and the walls that abutted them were plastered in cement.

In the first half of the 20th century, the chapel was abandoned and served sporadically as a warehouse, a shelter for gypsies and the homeless, and as a slaughterhouse. In 1938, the Minstério da Guerra (Ministry of War) requisitioned the use of the property from the Direcção-Geral de Edifícios e Monumentos Nacionais (General-Directorate for Buildings and National Monuments or DGEMN) for their military exercises. In 1937–1939 the DGEMN carried out restoration on the false arches in the nave, repaired the stonework with water-resistant mortar, modified the principal staircase with existing materials, cleaned the parapets and filled cracks, substituted and repaired the roofing tiles, repaired the doors, and re-spackled the vaulted ceilings. Along with these efforts there was a levelling of the terrain that included some excavations.

Owing to its intrinsic historical value, on 26 September 1940 the space was classified as a Imóvel de Interesse Público (Property of Public Interest), but on 1 November the passing of another ordinance suspended the previous classification. Little was done with the chapel until 1945–1946, when the structure was given to the Fábrica da Igreja Paroquial de Belém, the civic organisation associated with the parochial church of Belém. Recognising the need to safeguard the architectural significance of the hermitage, the municipal council of Lisbon enacted an urbanisation plan in 1953-1955 that isolated the chapel from other buildings and set a landscaping policy for the grounds. Landscape architect Gonçalo Ribeiro Telles petitioned the city's Department of Studies and Projects in 1954 to be allowed to collaborate in the urbanisation plan for the outskirts of Restelo. This was completed the following year under his guidance. When Ribeiro Telles began his project in 1956, the hilltop where the hermitage sits had completely open views, but was barren of vegetation and being eroded by the winds.

On 9 January 1956, an ordinance decreed the first Special Zone of Protection (Zona Especial de Proteção) for the hermitage, and In 1959 a campaign of cleaning and repairing the exterior stonework was begun, as well as levelling the adjacent lands. These operations continued until 1962 when the chapel was reopened. The masonry was cleaned and restored with general repairs such as filling the joints with water-resistant mortar and extending the cornices, repairing the pavement stones, and completing the lateral window. Repairs were made to the doors, the stairs, the roof tiles and the wood of the ceilings, as well as the azulejo tiles in the altar. However, in 1963–1964, evidence of water infiltration was found along the eastern walls of the building, so the DGMEN cleaned the gargoyles, which served as waterspouts to drain the roof.

In 1965, a ceremony called the Benção dos Bacalhoeiros (Blessing of the Codfishermen) was held in the hermitage in honor of an old tradition of the region. Preparations for the celebration included cleaning the exterior limestone and treating the doors with oil. Severe water penetration was again detected in 1966–1967. Ten years later, the sealing of the interior had not been completed, and heavy rainwater seeped into the building. An assessment of the roof determined that the gravel roof had lost its impermeability and was degrading. The gargoyles were again clogged with residue, and not properly draining rainwater.

On 1 June 1992, the property was transferred into the control of the Instituto Português do Património Arquitectónico (Portuguese Institute for Architectural Patrimony or IPPAR).

== Architecture ==
Isolated in the urban context of Santa Maria de Belém, the hermitage is situated on a hilltop, with its southern flank acting as a lookout. The space is encircled on all sides (except the northeast) by a small forest of trees on terraces, accompanying the relief of the Encosta do Restelo. To the north and east are the closest group of residential buildings, and accesses of the Praça de Itália and Rua Pêro de Covilhã.

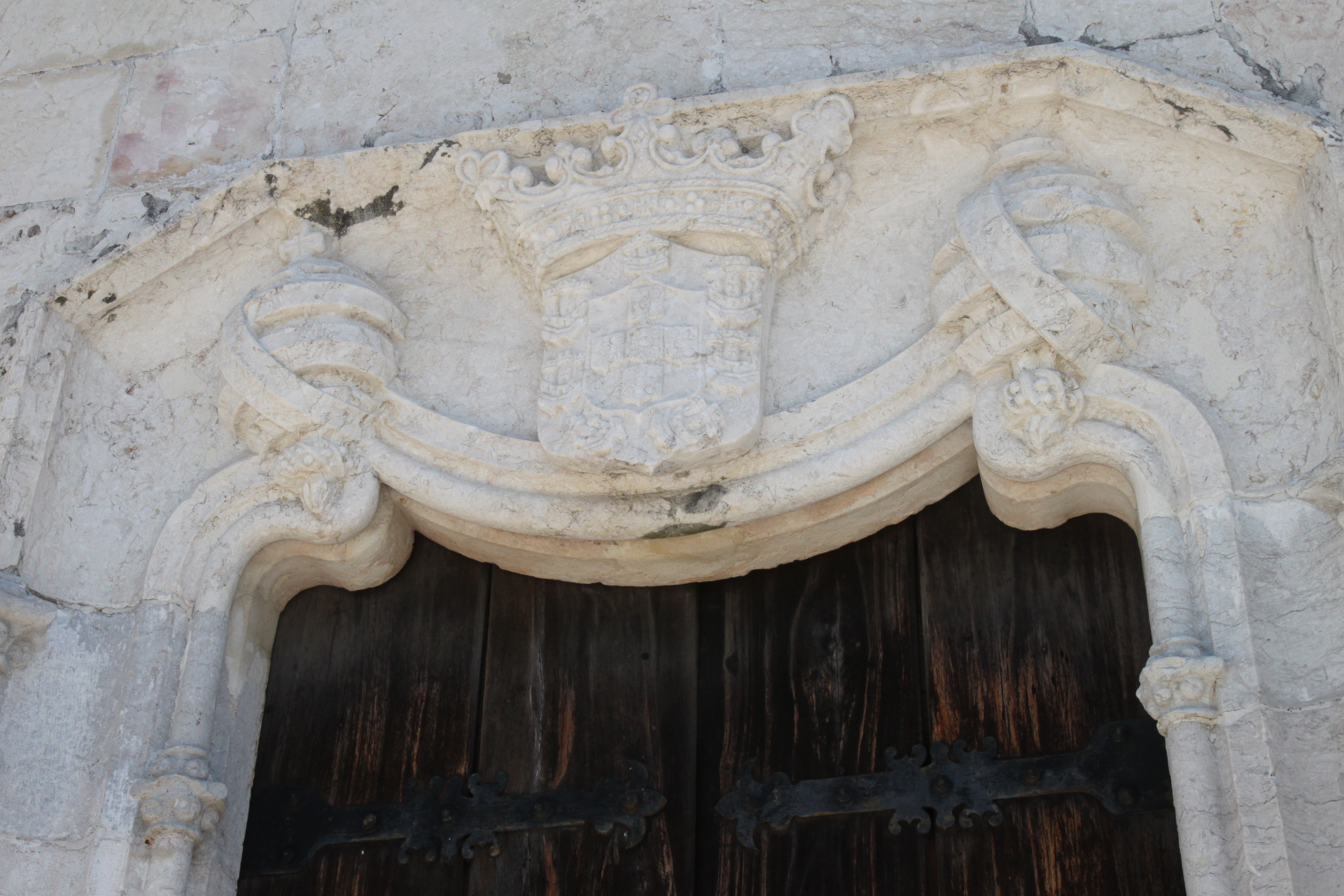
The main entrance to the hermitage, showing the ornate sculpted limestone and coat-of-arms

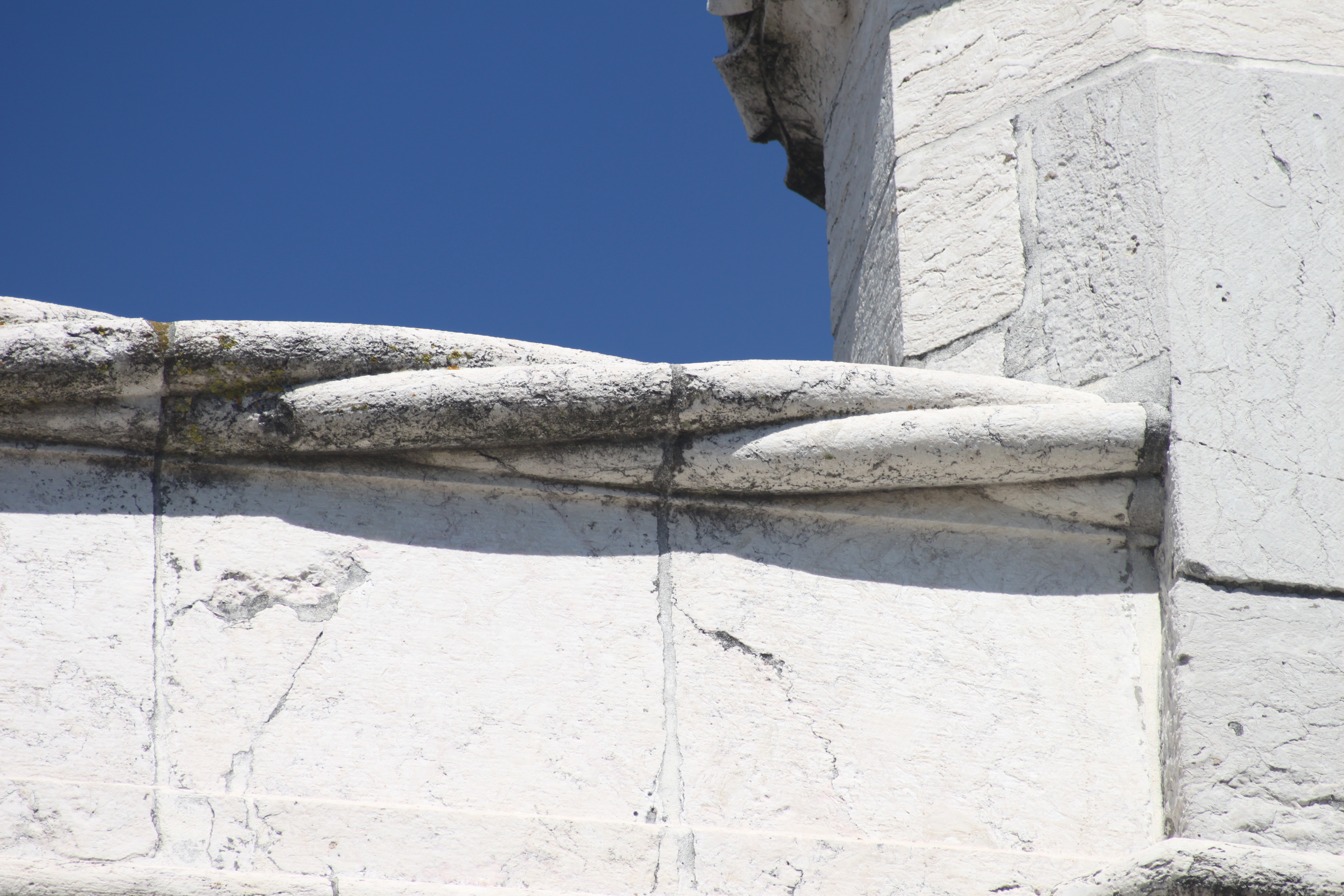
A detail of the twine cornice that encircles the terrace of the hermitage

The longitudinal plan of the hermitage comprises two rectangular spaces: the main chapel and the absinthe, with these horizontal bodies covered by a flat terrace/roof.

The principal face, oriented towards the southwest with little ornamentation, is a simple rectangular form. In the centre of this face is a poly-lobed arch with heraldic decoration, framed by columns that form a square arch, with chamfered vertices. The cornice, at roof-level, is surmounted by sculpted finial twine, while a cross is located over a sculpted plinth of sculpted putti. Along the southern facade is a rectangular window framed by columns, while the absinthe has a door with rectangular canopy-like frame and inscription, which is used to access a staircase. The rectangular frieze is framed by small columns, with semi-spheres to the interior. The east and north facades follow the pattern of the other facades. All corners of the structure are defined by three-level corner pilasters, placed obliquely, with zoomorphic gargoyles at roof level, above terrace's cornice, and surmounted by conical pinnacles.

The churchyard forms a privileged lookout over the Tower of Belém and the northern margin of the Tagus River. In front of the tower, to the southwest, is a small plateau slightly inclined towards the west, forming a greenspace delimited by a U-shaped area and the roadway. The green, approximately 1 metre (3.3 ft) below the elevation of the chapel, is separated from the churchyard by a small wall, with the exception of the space immediately in front of the hermitage. This area is delimited by forest planted in levels, descending towards the flanks of Restelo, until Rua de Alcolena. There is a general preoccupation with the distribution of the vegetation, strategically placed to allow views and privileged visual accesses to the river and Belem Tower. The wastern flanks are predominated by European olive trees (Olea europaea), while species such as the Mediterranean cypress (Cupressus sempervirens), the Mexican white cedar (Cupressus lusitanica), the Lebanese cedar (Cedrus libani), and the stone pine (Pinus pinea) dominate the eastern flanks. A stone staircase with various flights (in the Ducla Soares garden across from the Rua de Alcolena), connects the hermitage's first terrace to the Avenida do Restelo. This connection, which falls between the Tower of Belém and hermitage, is more evident along Avenida da Torre de Belém between May and summer, due to the patchwork of flowering trees, with a line of deep blue lilacs.

Between the pine trees are two plaques, with inscriptions: one, "A partida de Belém, como Vossa Alteza sabe, foi segunda-feira, 9 de Março. Pero Vaz de Caminha" (The departure from Belém, as Your Highness knows, was on Monday, 9 March); and "Marco feito erigir pelo Governo Brasileiro no V Centenário do Nascimento de Pedro Álvares Cabral, Lisboa 29-06-1968" (Marker erected by the Brazilian Government, in the 5th Centenary of the Birth of Pedro Álvaras Cabral 29 June 1968).

Due to its location, on the highest point nearest the Monastery of Santa Maria de Belém, and because of its rooftop terrace (accessible by exterior staircase in the north), it is likely that the chapel also served the function as an extra-liturgical lookout, giving line of sight to the Tagus, Tower of Belem and Monastery. This privileged lookout permitted the monks to view incoming ships, of which they had the right to 20% of the commerce transported by carracks. Originally, the building was constructed to permit a line of sight: the lack of vegetation (at the time) allowed direct visual contact with the Tower.

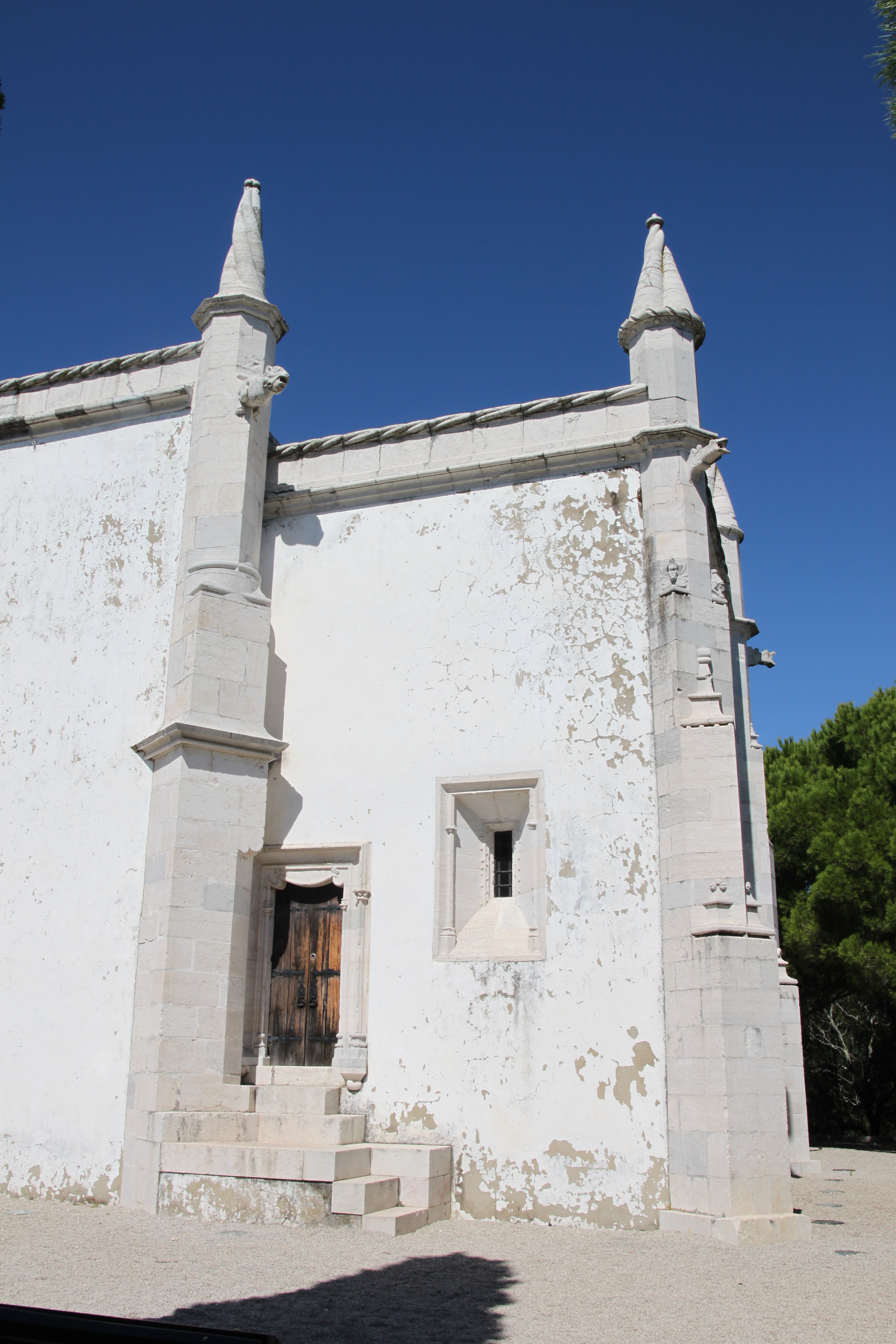
Southwest corner at the absinthe with terrace access

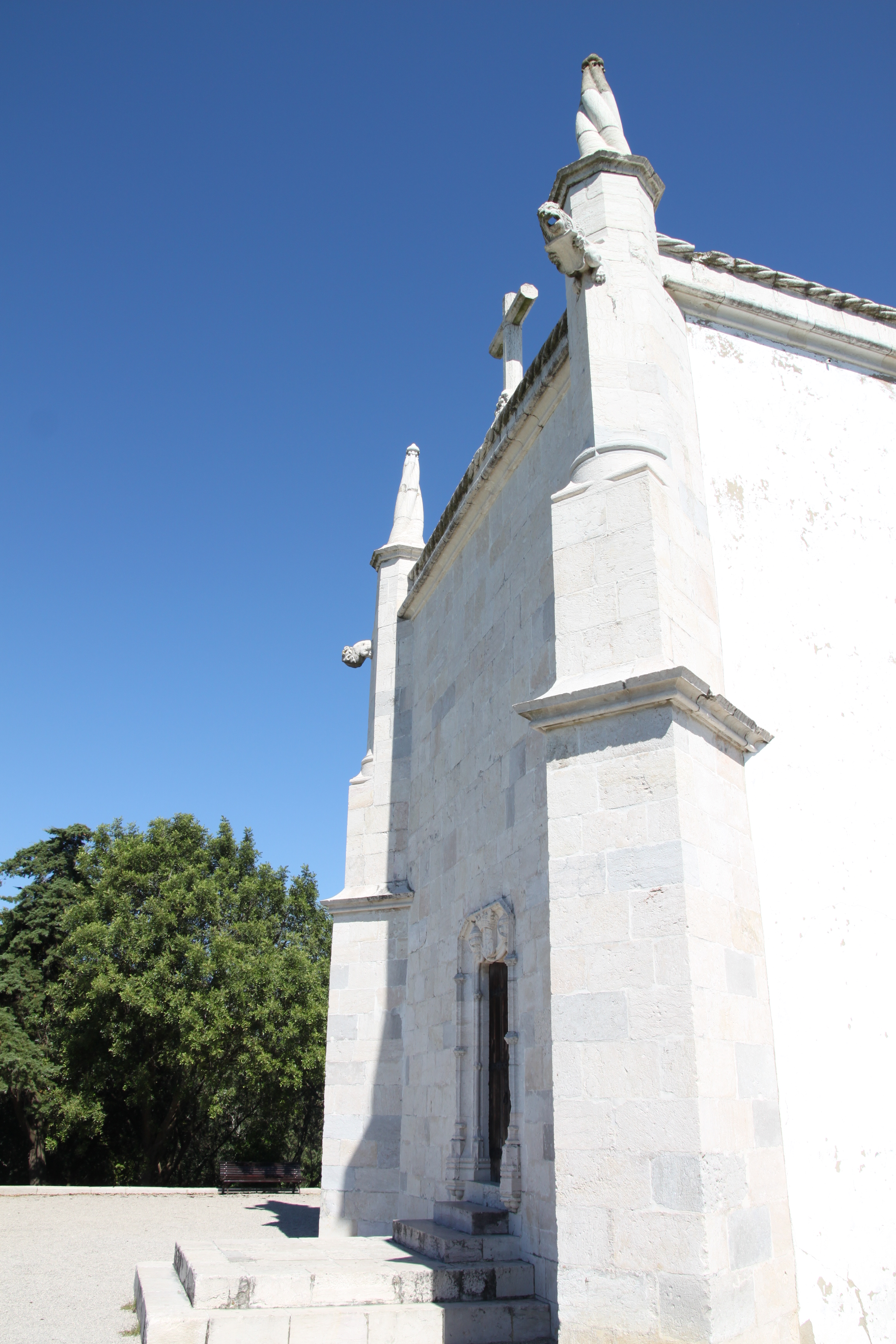
Oblique view of buttresses and pinnacles

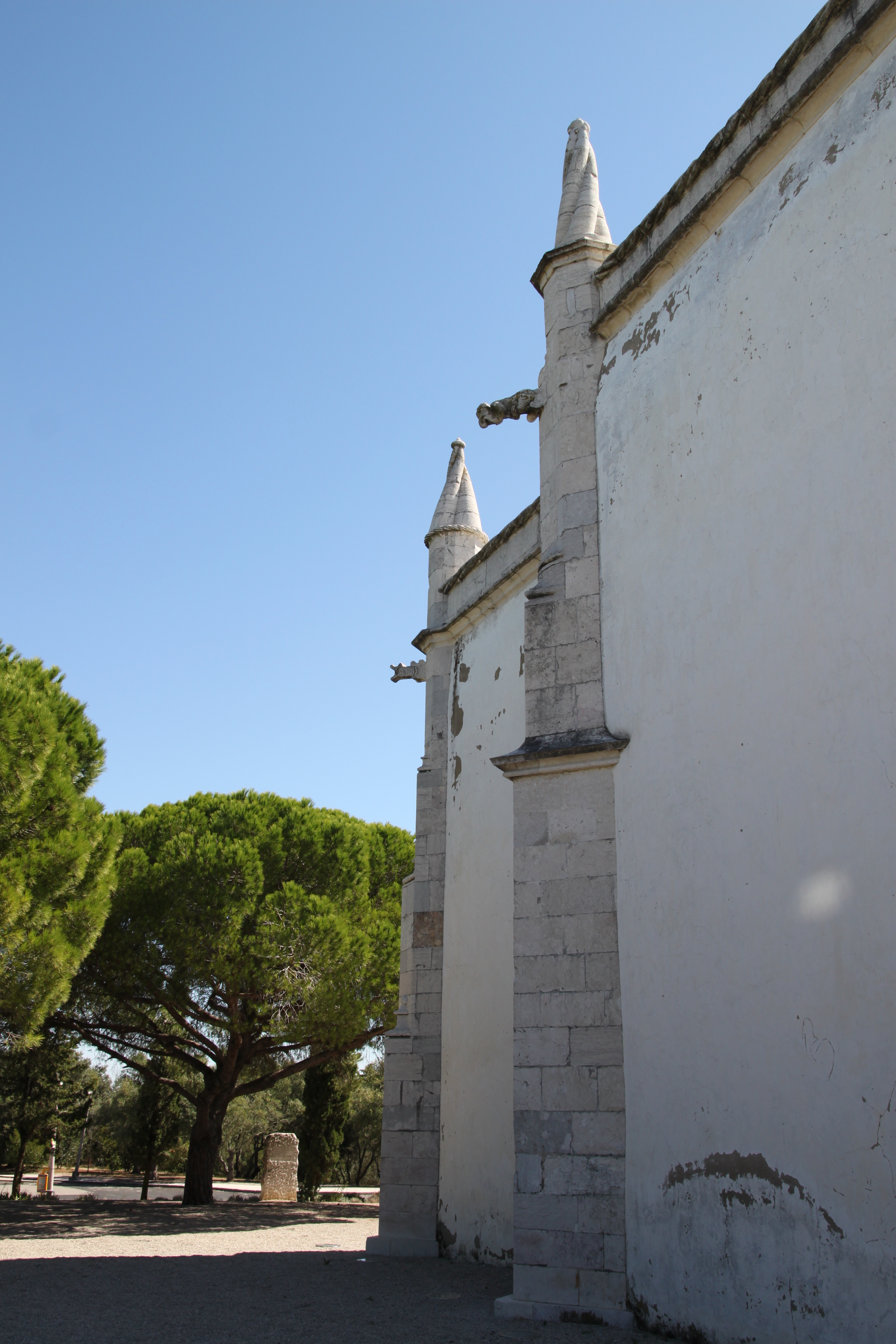
Northeast corner of the absinthe and nave

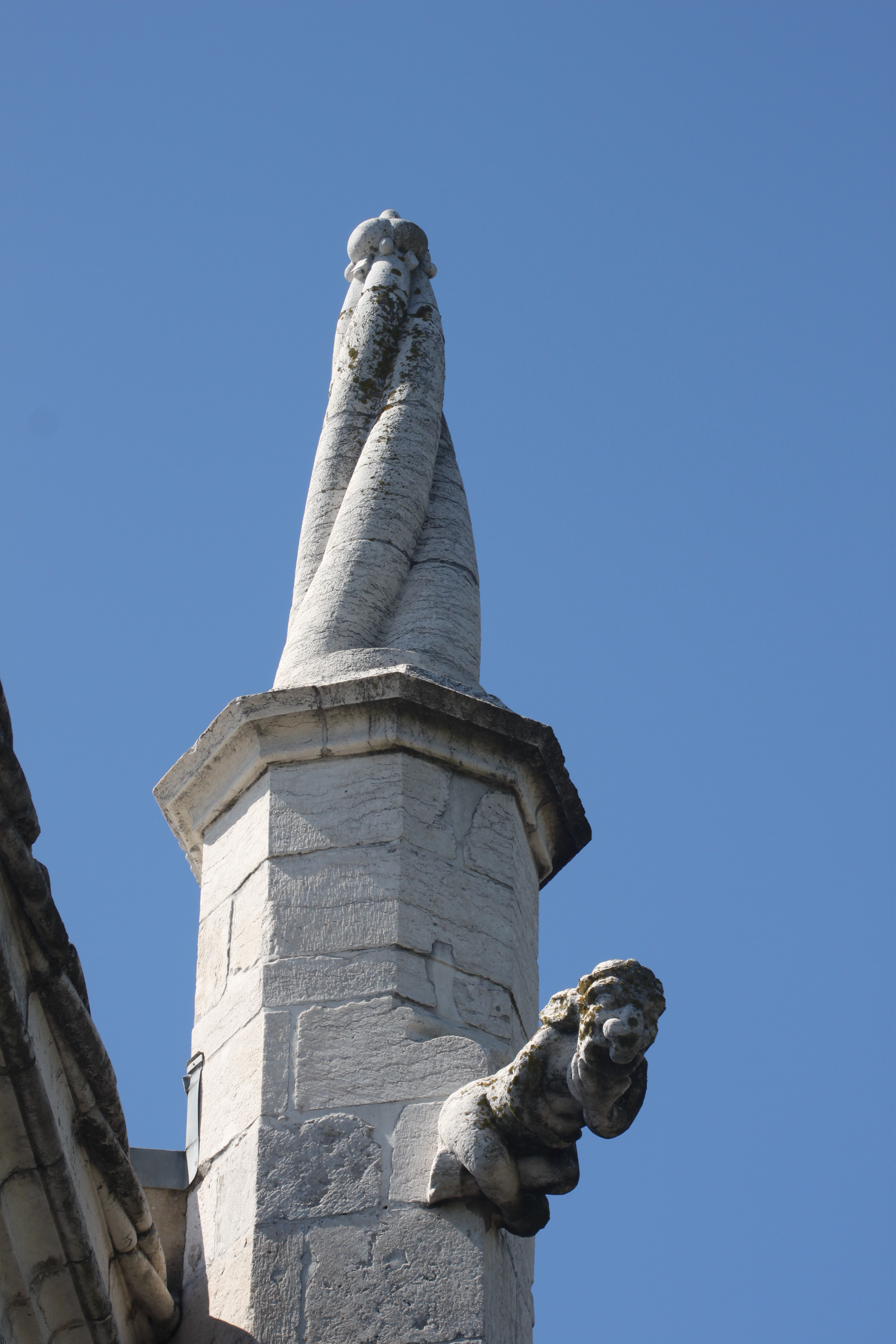
Detail of the corner pinnacles

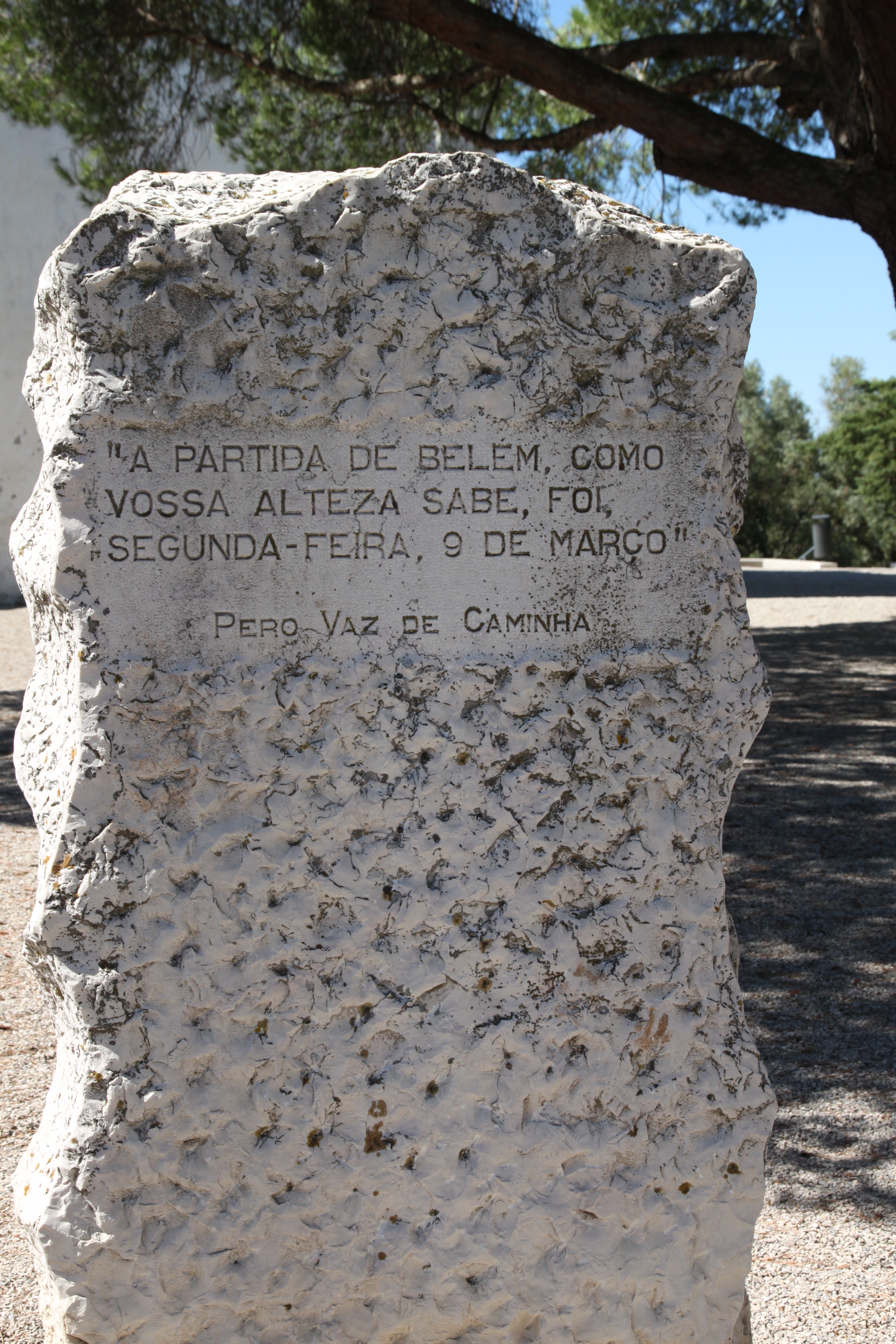
The departure from Belém, as Your Highness knows, was on Monday, 9 March

=== Interior ===
The single nave has north- and south-facing walls with an arcosolium surmounted by canopies and a small empty niche on the eastern wall. The southern wall, with a rectangular window, includes a portion of the vaulted ceiling which has stars, vegetal motifs and heraldry over the corner corbels. The triumphal arch that separates the apse from the nave is sectioned by lateral colonnades, decorated with rosettes and surmounted by a coat-of-arms attributed to Saint Jerome. The presbytery with its rectangular window and southern doorway is covered with a star-shaped, ribbed, vaulted ceiling. The altar is decorated with Mudéjar azulejo tiles, the original of which is housed in the Museu do Azulejo (Museum of Azulejo).
