= Monastery of the Holy Cross (Coimbra) =

Church in Portugal

Coordinates: 40°12′39.40″N 8°25′43.91″W

- Main façade and portal

Location
- Interactive map of Monastery of the Holy Cross

The Monastery of the Holy Cross (Portuguese: Mosteiro da Santa Cruz), also known as the Church of the Holy Cross, is a National Monument in Coimbra, Portugal. Because the first two kings of Portugal are buried in the church, it was granted the status of National Pantheon.

Founded in 1131 outside the protecting walls of Coimbra, the Monastery of the Holy Cross was the most important monastic house during the early days of the Portuguese monarchy. Saint Theotonius founded this community of Canons Regular of the Holy Cross of Coimbra and served as their first prior. The monastery and church were erected between 1132 and 1223, to the height of 25 meters.

The monastery was granted numerous papal privileges and royal grants, which allowed the accumulation of considerable wealth, at the same time as it consolidated its position on the politico-institutional and cultural scene. Its school, with its vast library, was highly respected in medieval times and was a meeting point for the intellectual and power elites. Its scriptorium was used for the consolidation of royal power by King Afonso Henriques, thus it was not considered strange that he decided to be buried there.

== Architecture ==
Nothing remains of the early Romanesque monastery. It is known that it had only one nave and a high tower in the façade, as typical of the Augustinian-Romanesque constructions, but none of those elements subsisted. In the first half of the 16th century, the Monastery was completely renovated by King Manuel's order, this monarch having assumed the Monastery tutelage.

The whole monastic complex, the church and the tombs of King Afonso Henriques and of his successor, King Sancho I, were rearranged and transferred to the main-chapel in 1530, where they still lie in a sculptural work by Nicolau Chanterene. The architect Diogo de Boitaca was responsible for the layout of the Manueline church and the chapter house with its basket-handled and ribbed ceilings. Marco Pires gave continuity to the work, with the completion of the church, the Capela de São Miguel (St. Michael's Chapel) and the Claustro do Silêncio (Cloister of Silence). The main portal, built between 1522 and 1525 under Chanterene, is the most emblematic piece of the whole monastic ensemble, harmonising the artistic elements of the Manueline with other features from Renaissance inspiration.

Through the whole 16th century, the most respected architects, sculptors, and painters worked at the Monastery of the Holy Cross of Coimbra, such as Diogo de Castilho, Machim and Jean of Rouen, Cristóvão de Figueiredo and Vasco Fernandes besides the already mentioned Chanterene, Boitaca and Diogo Pires the Younger. The sacristy dates back to the 17th century and keeps some notable 16th-century canvases.

== Members of the community ==
Saint Anthony of Lisbon, more widely known as Saint Anthony of Padua, was a member of the community of canons regular, and after his ordination, he was placed in charge of hospitality for the monastery. It was in this capacity that he welcomed the remains of the Franciscan protomartyrs, whose remains were being transported back to Assisi, after their deaths in Morocco. This led to his decision to leave the security and ease of the life of a canon for that of the newly founded Franciscans.

Main façade and portal

Nave looking toward the high altar

Carved stone pulpit in the nave

Pipe organ

Chancel with the royal tombs flanking the high altar

Tomb and effigy of Afonso Henriques

Tomb and effigy of Sancho I

Choir loft with carved wooden choir stalls

Sacristy

Sanctuary with reliquaries

Cloister of Silence

Chapter house and chapel of Saint Theotonius

== See also ==
- Livro da Noa

== Bibliography ==
- Cruz, António (1964). Santa Cruz de Coimbra na cultura portuguesa da Idade Média (in Portuguese). Porto: Universidade do Porto.
- David, Pierre (1947). "Regula Sancti Augustini, à propos d'une fausse chartre de fondation du chapitre de Coimbre," Revista Portuguesa de História 3 (1947), pp. 27–39.
- João Madre de Deos (1839). Memoria sobre a existencia de real mosteiro de Santa Cruz de Coimbra: supprimido por um decreto no anno de 1834 (in Portuguese). Lisbon: C.A. da Silva Carvalho.
- O'Malley, E. Austin (1954). Tello and Theotonio, the Twelfth-century Founders of the Monastery of Santa Cruz in Coimbra (Washington, DC: Catholic University Press, 1954).
- Sousa Viterbo, Francisco, Marques de (1890). O mosteiro de Sancta Cruz de Coimbra: Annotações e documentos (in Portuguese). Coimbra: Imprensa da Universidade.
