= Jerónimos Monastery =

Building in Santa Maria de Belém, Lisbon District, Portugal

- Mosteiro dos Jerónimos
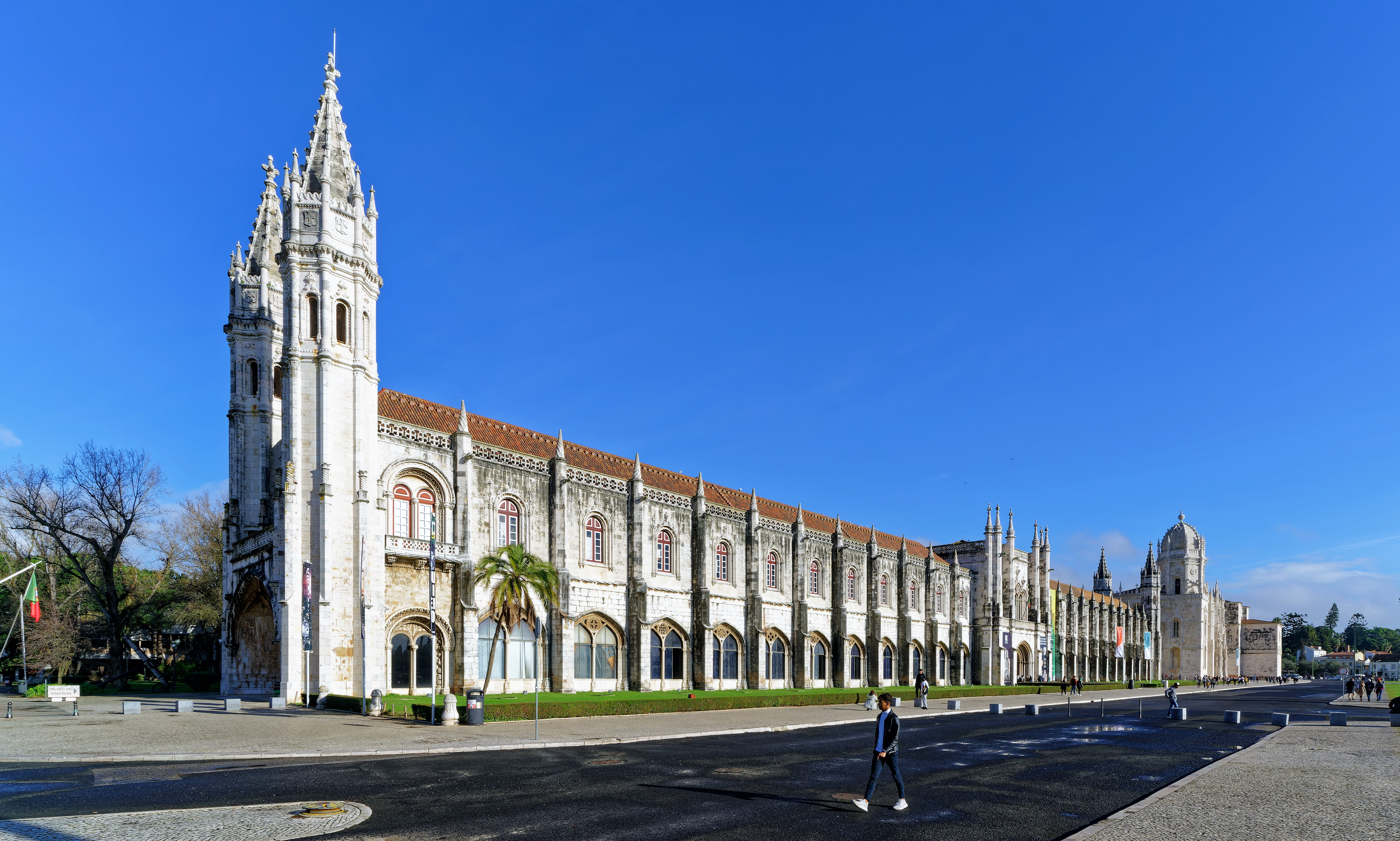
- The main visitors' entrance and wings housing the Maritime Museum and the National Archaeology Museum

General information
- Type: Monastery
- Architectural style: Portuguese Gothic, Manueline architecture
- Location: Santa Maria de Belém, Lisbon, Portugal
- Coordinates: 38°41′52″N 9°12′22″W
- Opened: 1495
- Owner: Portuguese Republic

Technical details
- Material: Lioz stone

Design and construction
- Architect: Diogo de Boitaca

Website
- www.mosteirojeronimos.pt

UNESCO World Heritage Site
- Official name: Monastery of the Hieronymites and Tower of Belém
- Location: Europe and North America
- Criteria: iii, vi
- Reference: 263
- Inscription: 1983 (7th Session)

Portuguese National Monument
- Type: Non-movable
- Criteria: National Monument
- Designated: 10 January 1907
- Reference no.: IPA.00006543

The Jerónimos Monastery or Hieronymites Monastery (Portuguese: Mosteiro dos Jerónimos, pronounced [muʃˈtɐjɾu ðu(ʒ) ʒɨˈɾɔnimuʃ]) is a former monastery of the Order of Saint Jerome near the Tagus river in the parish of Belém, in the Lisbon Municipality, Portugal. It became the necropolis of the Portuguese royal dynasty of Aviz in the 16th century but was secularized on 28 December 1833 by state decree and its ownership transferred to the charitable institution, Real Casa Pia de Lisboa.

The Jerónimos Monastery is one of the most prominent examples of the late Portuguese Gothic Manueline style of architecture in Lisbon. It was erected in the early 1500s near the launch point of Vasco da Gama's first journey, and its construction funded by a tax on the profits of the yearly Portuguese India Armadas. In 1880, da Gama's remains and those of the poet Luís de Camões (who celebrated da Gama's first voyage in his 1572 epic poem The Lusiad), were moved to new carved tombs in the nave of the monastery's church, only a few meters away from the tombs of the kings Manuel I and John III, whom da Gama had served. In 1983, the Jerónimos Monastery was classified as a UNESCO World Heritage Site, along with the nearby Tower of Belém.

== History ==
The Jerónimos Monastery replaced the church formerly existing in the same place, which was dedicated to Santa Maria de Belém and where the monks of the military-religious Order of Christ provided assistance to seafarers in transit. The harbour of Praia do Restelo was an advantageous spot for mariners, with a safe anchorage and protection from the winds, sought after by ships entering the mouth of the Tagus. The existing structure was inaugurated on the orders of Manuel I (1469–1521) at the cortes of Montemor o Velho in 1495, as a final resting-place for members of the House of Aviz, in his belief that an Iberian dynastic kingdom would rule after his death. In 1496, King Manuel petitioned the Holy See for permission to construct a monastery at the site. The Hermitage of Restelo (Ermida do Restelo), as the church was known, was already in disrepair when Vasco da Gama and his men spent the night in prayer there before departing on their expedition to India in 1497.

== Renaissance ==
The construction of the monastery and church began on 6 January 1501, and was completed 100 years later. King Manuel originally funded the project with money obtained from the Vintena da Pimenta, a 5 percent tax on commerce from Africa and the Orient, equivalent to 70 kilograms (150 lb) of gold per year, with the exception of those taxes collected on the importation of pepper, cinnamon and cloves, which went directly to the Crown. With the influx of such riches, the architects were not limited to small-scale plans, and resources already prescribed for the Monastery of Batalha, including the Aviz pantheon, were redirected to the project in Belém.

Manuel I selected the religious order of Hieronymite monks to occupy the monastery, whose role it was to pray for the King's eternal soul and to provide spiritual assistance to navigators and sailors who departed from the port of Restelo to discover lands around the world. This the monks did for over four centuries until 1833, when the religious orders were dissolved and the monastery was abandoned.

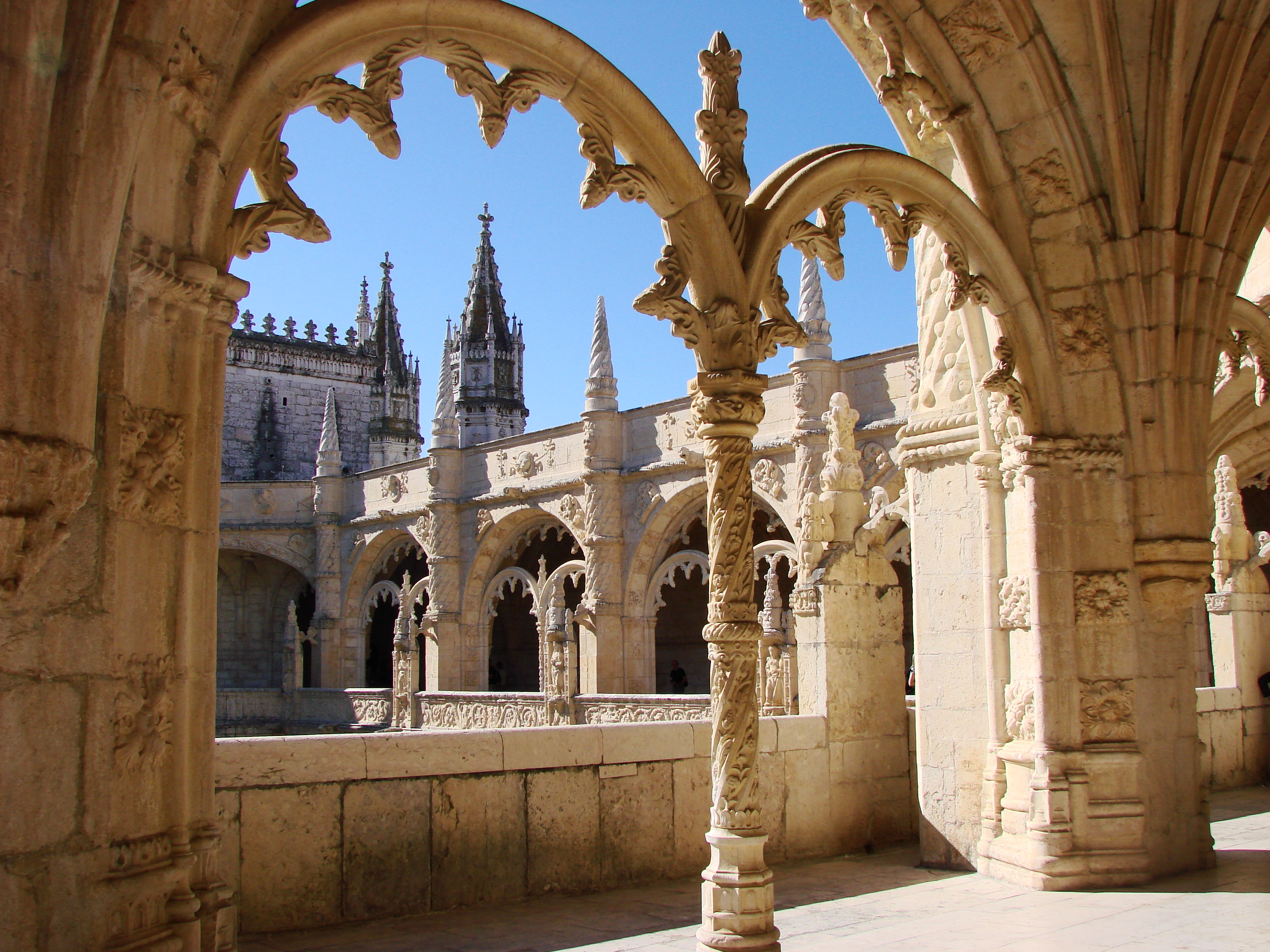
Manueline ornamentation in the cloisters of Jerónimos Monastery

The monastery was designed in a manner that later became known as Manueline: a richly ornate architectural style with complex sculptural themes incorporating maritime elements and objects discovered during naval expeditions, carved in limestone. Diogo de Boitaca, the architect, pioneered this style in the Monastery of Jesus in Setúbal. Boitaca was responsible for drawing the plans and contracting work on the monastery, the sacristy, and the refectory. For its construction he used calcário de lioz, a gold-coloured limestone quarried from Ajuda, the valley of Alcántara, Laveiras, Rio Seco and Tercena. Boitaca was succeeded by the Spaniard Juan de Castillo, who took charge of construction around 1517. Castilho gradually moved from the Manueline to the Spanish Plateresque style, an ornamentation that included lavish decorations suggesting the decorative features of silverware (plata). The construction came to a halt when King Manuel I died in 1521.

Several sculptors left their mark on this building: Nicolau Chanterene added depth with his Renaissance themes, while the architect Diogo de Torralva resumed construction of the monastery in 1550, adding the main chapel, the choir, and completing the two stories of the monastery, using only Renaissance motifs. Diogo de Torralva's work was continued in 1571 by Jérôme de Rouen (also called Jerónimo de Ruão) who added some classical elements. The construction stopped in 1580 with the union of Spain and Portugal, as the building of the Escorial in Spain was now draining away all the allocated funds.

=== Kingdom ===
On 16 July 1604, Philip of Spain (who ruled after the Iberian Union) made the monastery a royal funerary monument, prohibiting anyone but the royal family and the Hieronymite monks from entering the building. A new portal was constructed in 1625, as well as the cloister door, the house of the doorkeepers, a staircase and a hall that was the entrance to the upper choir designed by the royal architect Teodósio Frias and executed by the mason Diogo Vaz. In 1640, the prior Bento de Siqueira ordered construction of the monastery's library, where books owned by the Infante Luís (son of King Manuel I) and others linked to the religious order were deposited.

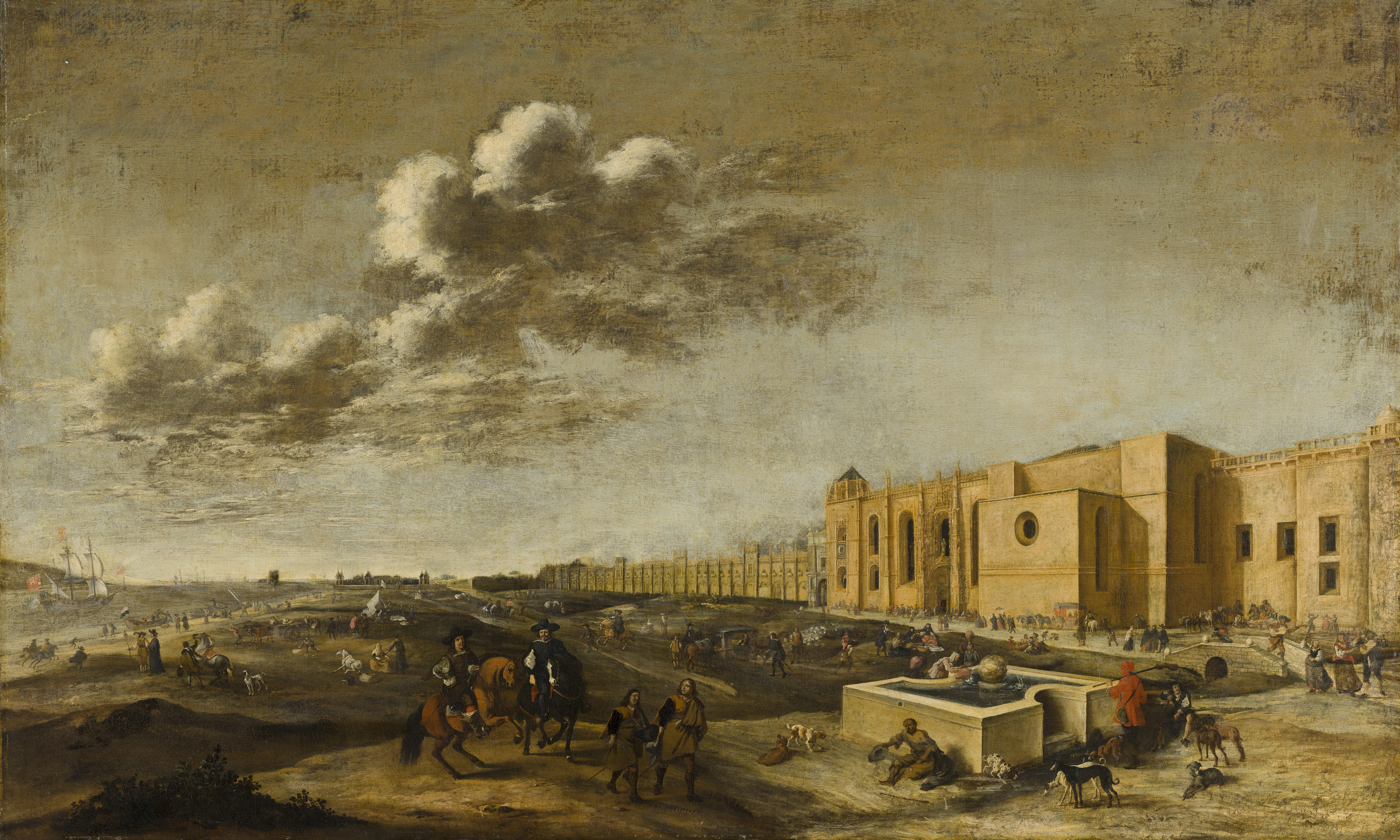
Jerónimos monastery in the 1660s to the 1670s, by Dirk Stoop.

With the restoration of Portuguese Independence in 1640, the monastery regained much of its former importance, becoming the burial place for the royal pantheon; within its walls four of the eight children of John IV of Portugal were entombed: the Infante Teodósio (1634–1653), the Infanta Joana (1636–1653), King Afonso VI (1643–1683) and Catarina de Bragança (1638–1705). In 1682 the body of Cardinal Henrique was buried in the transept chapels. On 29 September 1855, the body of King Afonso VI was transported to the royal pantheon of the House of Braganza in the Monastery of São Vicente de Fora, along with his three brothers and sister.

In 1663, the Brotherhood of the Senhor dos Passos occupied the old Chapel of Santo António, which was redecorated with a gold tiled ceiling in 1669, while the staircase frescos with the heraldry of Saint Jerome were completed in 1770. The retables were completed in 1709 and 1711, valuable alfaias were presented to the religious order, and the sacristy was redecorated in 1713. The painter Henrique Ferreira was commissioned in 1720 to paint the Kings of Portugal: the regal series was placed in the Sala dos Reis (Hall of the Kings). Henrique Ferreira was also commissioned to complete a series of nativity paintings.

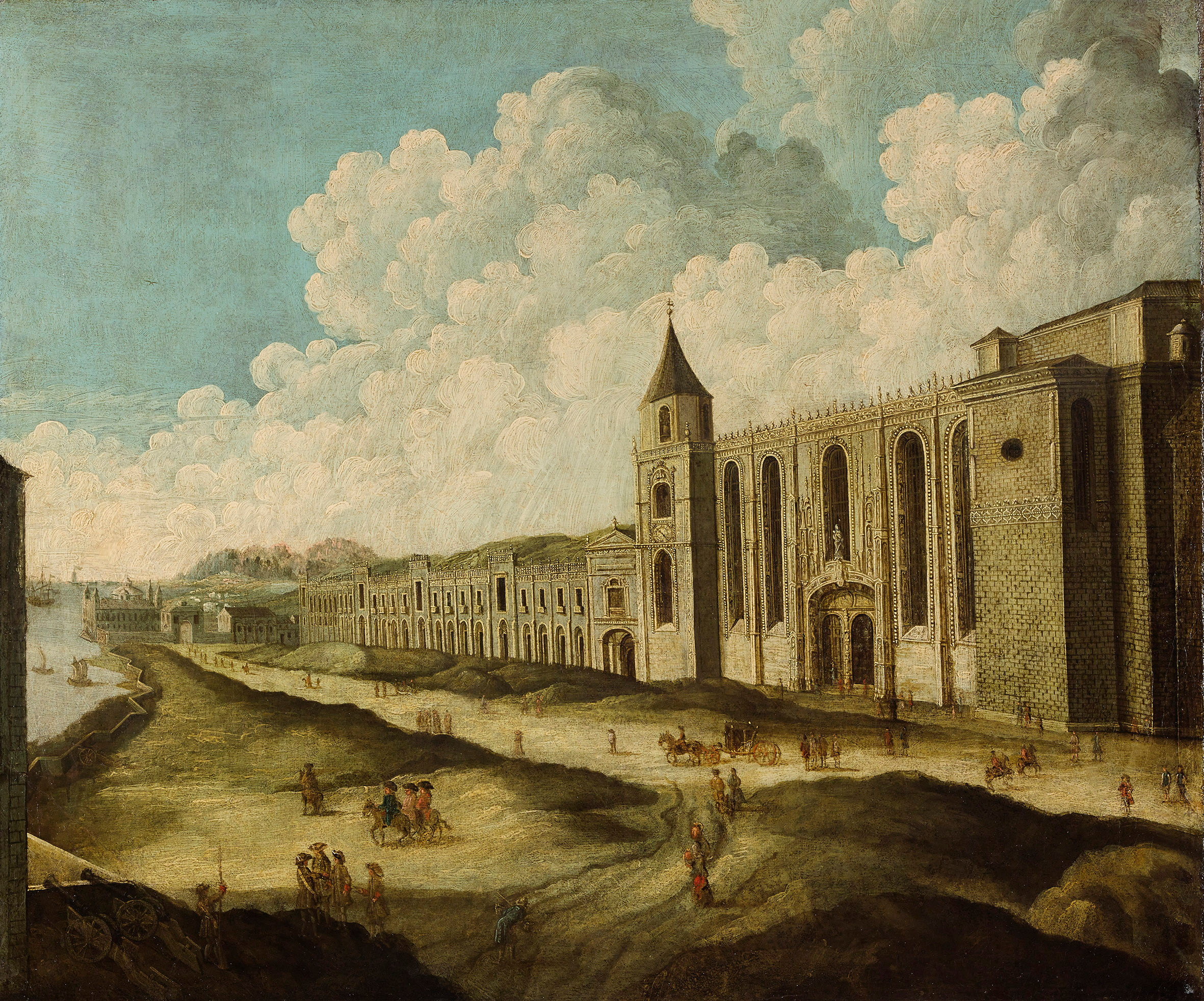
Jerónimos Monastery in the mid-18th century, before the 1755 Lisbon earthquake.

The monastery withstood the 1755 Lisbon earthquake without much damage: only the balustrade and part of the high choir were ruined, but they were quickly repaired. On 28 December 1833, the Jerónimos Monastery was secularised by state decree and its title transferred to the Real Casa Pia de Lisboa (Pious Royal House of Lisbon) to serve as a parochial church for the new civil parish of Santa Maria de Belém. Many of the artworks and treasures were either transferred to the crown or lost during this period. It was vacant most of the time and its condition began to deteriorate.

Restoration work began on the monastery after 1860, starting with the southern façade under supervision of the architect Rafael Silva e Castro, and in 1898 under Domingos Parente da Silva. Although the cloister cistern, internal clerical cells and the kitchen were demolished at this time, three reconstruction projects proposed by architect J. Colson, including the introduction of revivalist neo-Manueline elements, failed to gain the required approval. In 1863, architect Valentim José Correia was hired by the ombudsman of the Casa Pia, Eugénio de Almeida, to reorganise the second storey of the old dormitory and design the windows (1863–1865). He was subsequently replaced by Samuel Barret, who constructed the towers in the extreme western end of the dormitories. Similarly and inexplicably, Barret was replaced by the Italian scenery designers Rambois and Cinatti, who had worked on the design of the São Carlos Theatre, to continue the remodelling within the monastery in 1867. Between 1867 and 1868, they profoundly altered the annex and façade of the Church, which then appeared as it does today. They demolished the gallery and Hall of the Kings, constructed the towers of the eastern dormitory, the rose window of the upper choir and substituted the pyramid-shaped roof of the bell tower with the mitre-shaped design. The remodelling was delayed by the 1878 collapse of the central dormitory. After 1884, Raymundo Valladas began to contribute, initiating in 1886 the restoration of the cloister and the Sala do Capítulo, including construction of the vaulted ceiling. The tomb of Alexandre Herculano, designed by Eduardo Augusto da Silva, was placed in the Sala do Capítulo in 1888.

To celebrate the 1898 fourth centenary of the arrival of Vasco da Gama in India, it was decided to restore the tomb of the explorer in 1894. The tombs of Vasco da Gama and Luís de Camões, carved by the sculptor Costa Mota, were placed in the southern lateral chapel. A year later the monastery received the remains of the poet João de Deus, later joined by the tombs of Almeida Garret (1902), Sidónio Pais (1918), Guerra Junqueiro (1923) and Teófilo Braga (1924).

=== Republic ===
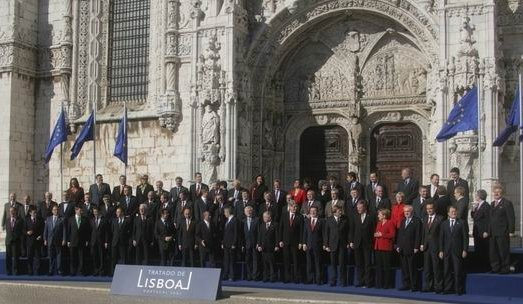
The official picture taken after the signing of the Lisbon Treaty in front of the South Portal

The Minister of Public Works (Ministério das Obras Públicas) opened a competition to finish the annex, which would serve as the National Museum of Industry and Commerce (Museu Nacional da Indústria e Comércio), but the project was canceled in 1899, and the Ethnological Museum of Portugal (Museu Etnológico Português) was installed.

Further remodelling of the monastery was begun in 1898 subsequent to the work done by Parente da Silva in 1895 on the central annex, now simplified, as well as restoration of the cadeirals (the chairs used by the clergy in religious services), which were completed in 1924 by sculptor Costa Mota. In 1938 the organ in the high choir was dismantled at the same time that a series of stained-glass windows, designed by Abel Manta and executed by Ricardo Leone, were replaced in the southern façade.

As part of the celebrations marking the centenary of modern Portugal in 1939, yet more remodelling was completed in the monastery and tower. During these projects, the baldachin and tomb of Alexandre Herculano were dismantled and the cloister patio was paved. In 1940 the space in front of the monastery was redesigned for the Portuguese Exposition. The Casa Pia vacated the interior spaces of the cloister and the tombs of Camões and Vasco da Gama were transferred to the lower choir. A series of windows designed by Rebocho and executed by Alves Mendes were completed in 1950.

In 1951 the remains of president Óscar Carmona were entombed in the Sala do Capítulo. They would later be transported to the National Pantheon in 1966 to join the bodies of other former presidents and literary heroes of the country.

The Maritime Museum (Museu da Marinha) was inaugurated in the western wing of the monastery in 1963.

== Republic ==
The church and the monastery, like the nearby Torre de Belém and Padrão dos Descobrimentos, symbolise the Portuguese Age of Discovery and are among the main tourist attractions of Lisbon. In 1983, UNESCO formally designated the Monastery of the Hieronymites and Tower of Belém as a World Heritage Site.

When Portugal joined the European Economic Community, the formal ceremonies were held in the cloister of the monument (1985).

Two major exhibitions took place at the monastery during the 1990s: 4 séculos de pintura (Portuguese: Four Centuries of Paintings), in 1992; and the exposition "Leonardo da Vinci – um homem à escala do mundo, um Mundo à escala do homem" (Portuguese: Leonardo da Vinci: A Man at the World's Scale, A World at the Scale of Man), in 1998 (which included the Leicester Codex, on temporary loan from Bill Gates).

At the end of the 20th century, remodelling continued with conservation, cleaning and restoration, including the main chapel in 1999 and the cloister in 1998–2002.

On 13 December 2007, the Treaty of Lisbon was signed at the monastery, laying down the basis for the reform of the European Union.

== Church of Santa Maria ==
=== South portal exterior ===
The ornate Manueline south portal by João de Castilho

The ornate side entrance to the monastery was designed by Juan de Castillo and is considered one of the most significant of his time, but is not, in fact, the main entrance to the building. This shrine-like portal is large, 32 metres (105 ft) high and 12 metres (39 ft) wide, extending two stories. Its ornate features includes an abundance of gables and pinnacles, with many carved figures standing under a baldachin in carved niches, around a statue of Henry the Navigator, standing on a pedestal between the two doors.

The tympanum, above the double door, displays, in half-relief, two scenes from the life of Saint Jerome: on the left, the removal of the thorn from the lion's paw and, on the right, the saint's experience in the desert. In the spandrel between these scenes is the coat of arms of king Manuel I, while the archivolt and tympanum are covered in Manueline symbols and elements. The Madonna (Santa Maria de Belém) is on a pedestal on top of the archivolt, surmounted by the archangel Michael, while above the portal there is a cross of the Order of Christ. The portal is harmoniously flanked on each side by a large window with richly decorated mouldings.

=== Axial portal exterior ===
Although of smaller dimensions than the southern doorway, this is the most important door to the Jerónimos because of its ornamentation and its position in front of the main altar. This western portal is a good example of the transition from the Gothic style to Renaissance. It was built by Nicolau Chanterene in 1517. This was probably his first commission in Portugal. It is now spanned by a vestibule, added in the 19th century, that forms a transition between the church and the ambulatory.

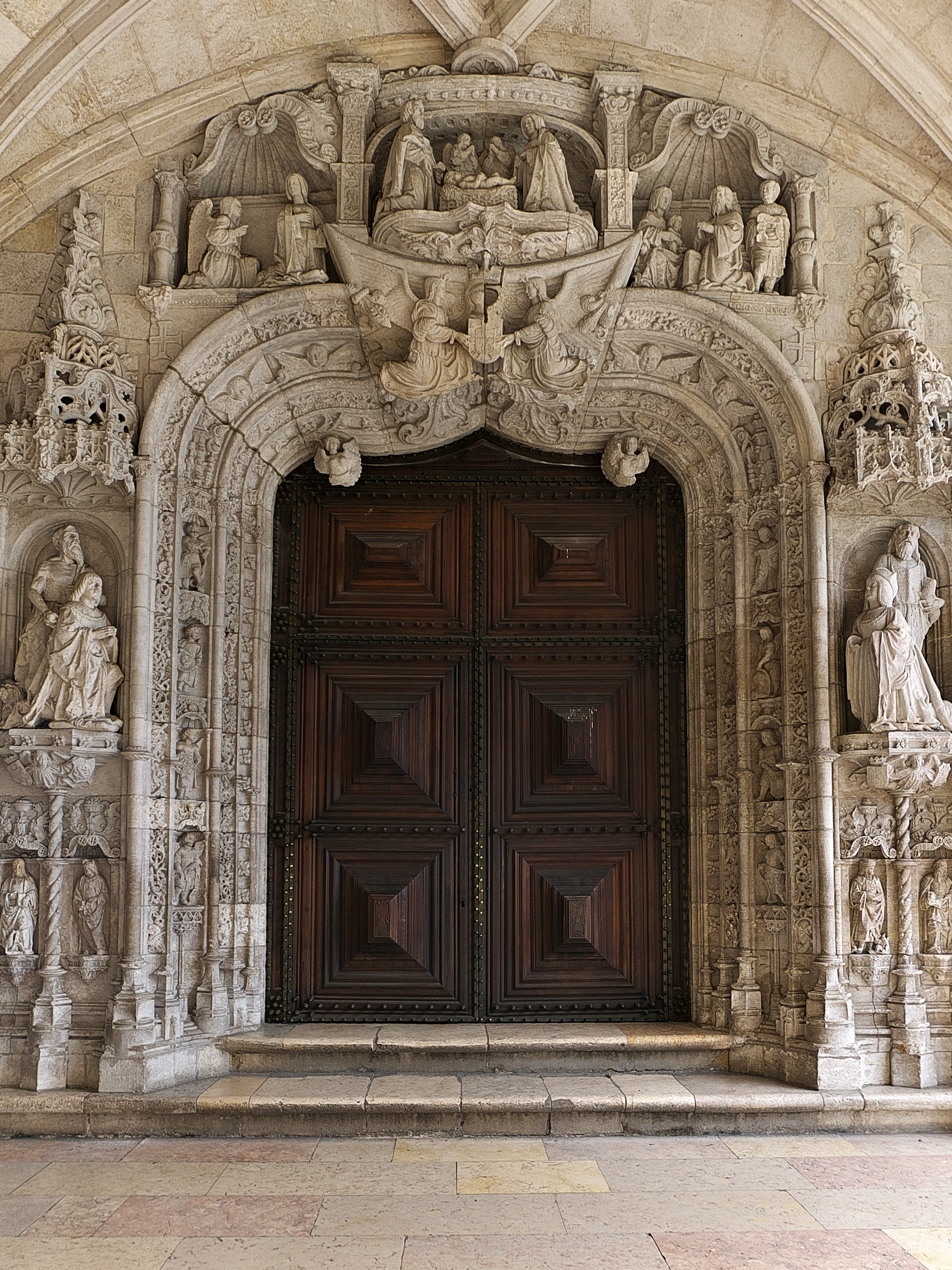
The Western portal, transition from the Gothic style to Renaissance, by sculptor Nicolau Chanterene, 1517

In the tympanum there are scenes from the birth of Christ: from the left to right: the Annunciation (of the angel indicating to Maria that she would give birth); the Nativity (the birth of the Christ child); and the Epiphany (the adoration of the magi). Two angels hold the arms of Portugal, close to the archivolt. The splays on each side of the portal are filled with statues, among them are statues of King Manuel I and Queen Maria of Aragón kneeling in a niche under a lavishly decorated baldachin, flanked by their patrons: Saint Jerome and Saint John the Baptist, respectively. The supporting corbels are decorated with little angels holding the coat-of-arms and, at the side of the king, an armillary sphere and, at the side of the queen, three blooming twigs. Renaissance elements include angels in Roman garb, cherubs, the detail and realism of the kings and the nude study of Saint Jerome.

Throughout the monastery there are representations of Saint Jerome, in paintings, sculptures and stained glass. There are three important examples:

- O Penitente no deserto (The Penitent in the Desert), located in the sub-chorus, near the tomb of Vasco da Gama, showing an emaciated saint in the desert, with a rock in his hand, while meditating in front of a crucifix;
- O Estudioso na sua cela (The Studious in his Cell), showing the saint seated at his workplace encircled by open books;
- O Doutor da Igreja (The Doctor in the Church), located in the high choir, depicting a solemn Saint Jerome standing in the red robes and hat of a cardinal.

The saint is always accompanied by a lion and bible.

=== Interior ===
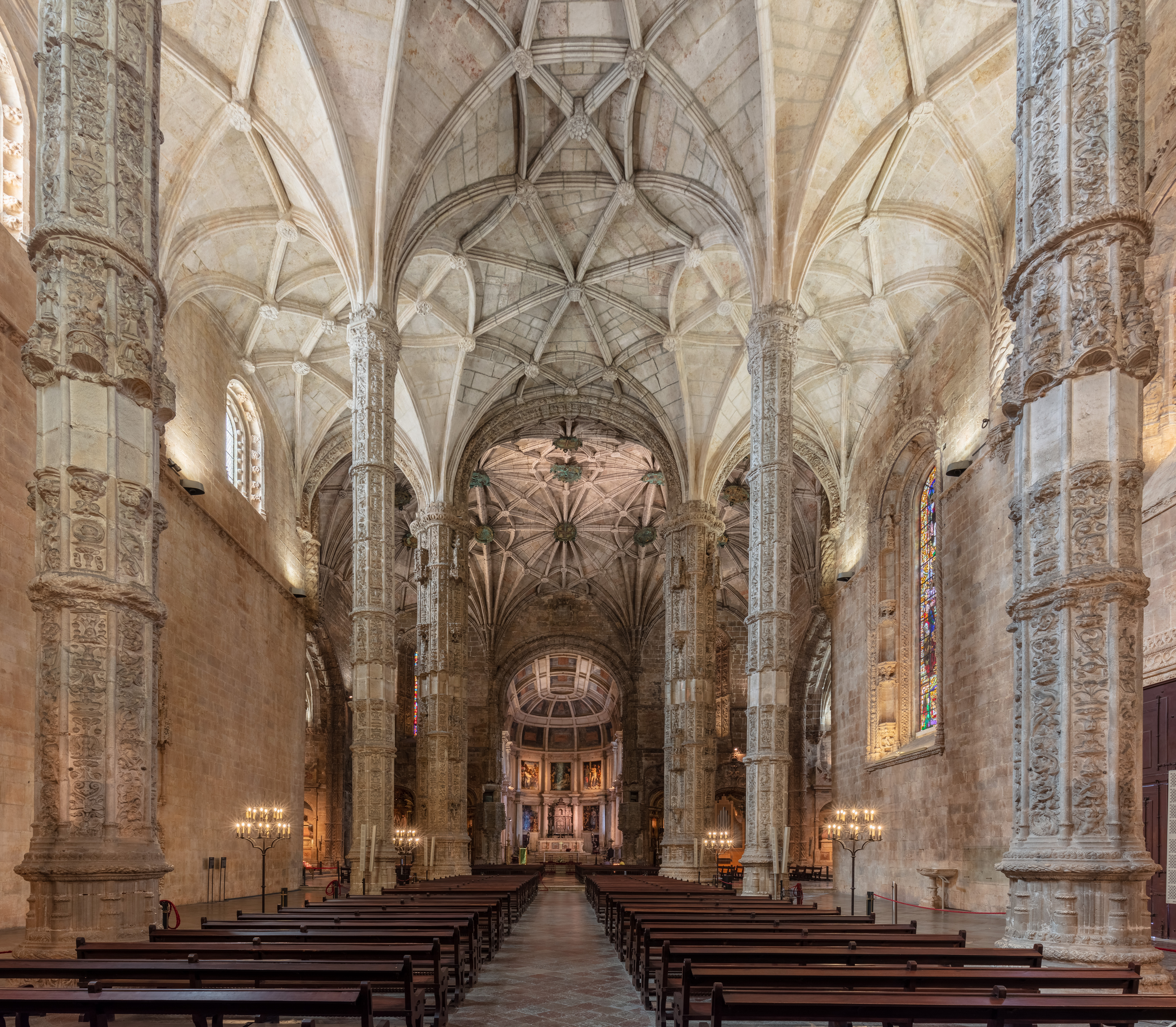
Interior of the church.

Diogo Boitac laid the foundations for this three-aisled church with five bays under a single vault, a clearly marked but only slightly projecting transept and a raised choir. The hall church layout is composed of aisles and nave that are of equal height. Boitac built the walls of the church as far as the cornices and then started with the construction of the adjoining monastery.

Juan de Castillo, a Spanish architect and sculptor, continued the construction in 1517. He completed the retaining walls and the unique single-span ribbed vault, a combination of stellar vaulting and tracery vaults spanning the 19-metre (62-ft) wide church. Each set of ribs in the vaulting is secured by bosses. The bold design (1522) of the transversal vault of the transept lacks any piers or columns, while Boitac had originally planned three bays in the transept. The transept's unsupported vault gives the visitor the impression that it floats in the air.

Castilho also decorated the six 25-metre-high, slender, articulated, octagonal columns with refined grotesque or floral elements typical of the Renaissance style. The construction of this late-Gothic hall is aesthetically and architecturally a masterwork: it augments the spatial effect of this vast building. The northern column closest to the transept there is a medallion that may have been intentionally included as a portrait of Boitac or Juan de Castilho.

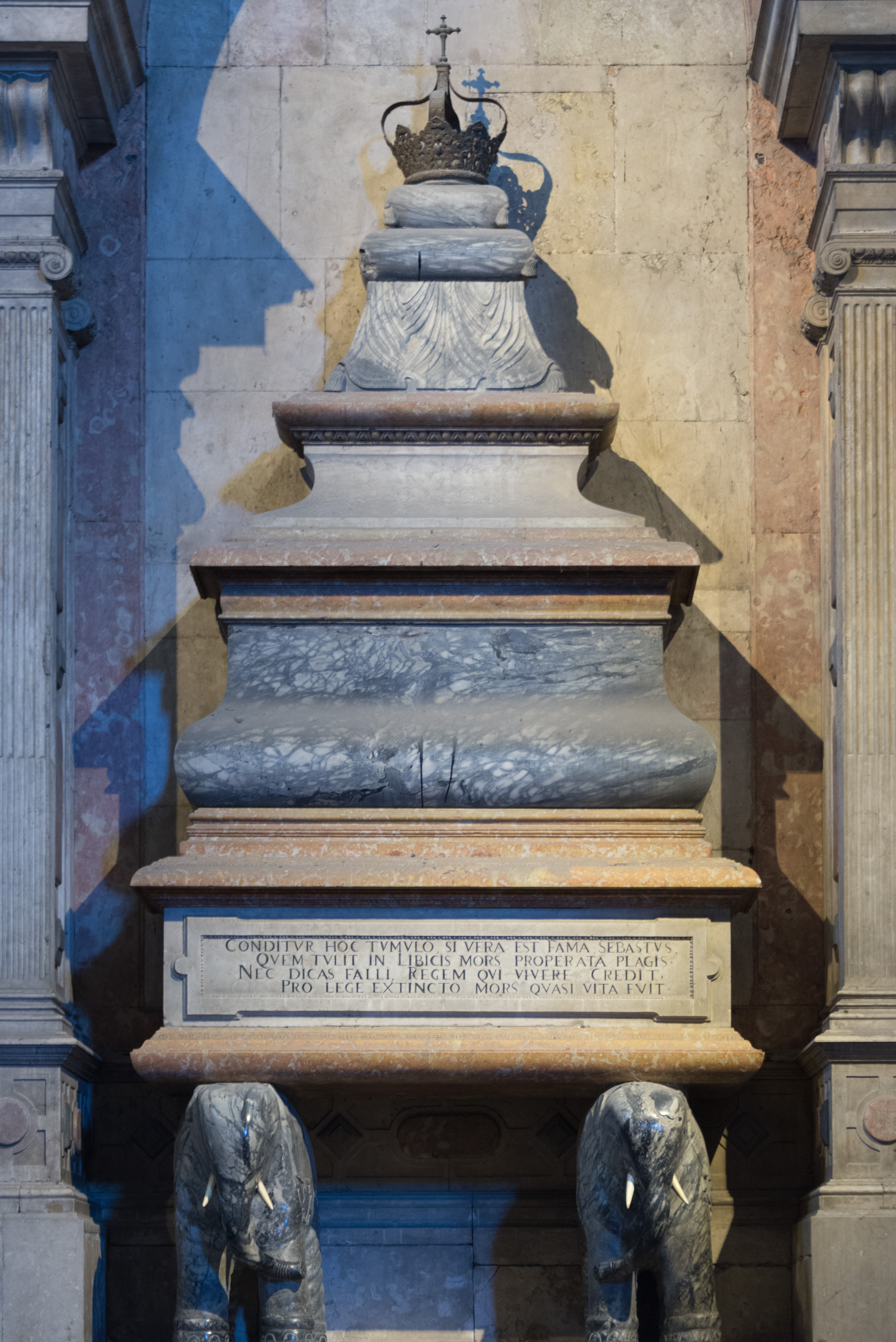
Royal tomb in the main chapel; the sarcophagus is held by two elephants

At the end of the side aisles and on both sides of the choir are altars (also in the Manueline style) dating from the 16th and the 17th centuries. They are decorated with carved wood and plated in golden and green pigment, and one of them supports the image of Saint Jerome in multi-coloured enamelled terracotta.

This chancel was ordered by Queen Catherine of Austria as the final resting place for the royal family. It is the work of Jerónimo de Ruão (Jean de Rouen) in the Classical style. The royal tombs rest on marble elephants and are set between Ionic pillars, topped by Corinthian pillars. The tombs on the left side of the choir belong to King Manuel I and his wife Maria of Aragon, while the tombs on the right side belong to King João III and his wife Catherine of Austria.

=== Tombs ===
Within the church, in the lower choir, are the stone tombs of Vasco da Gama (1468–1523), and of the great poet and chronicler of the Age of Discoveries, Luís de Camões (1527–1580). Both tombs were sculpted by the 19th-century sculptor Costa Mota in a harmonious neo-Manueline style. The mortal remains of both were transferred to these tombs in 1880.

== Monastery architecture ==
Two-storey cloisters

Decorated cloister arches

Work on the vast square cloister (55 × 55 m) of the monastery was begun by Boitac. He built the groin vaults with wide arches and windows with tracery resting on delicate mullions. Juan de Castilho finished the construction by giving the lower storey a classical overlay and building a more recessed upper storey. The construction of such a cloister was a novelty at the time. Castilho changed the original round columns of Boitac into rectangular ones, and embellished it with Plateresque-style ornamentation. Each wing consists of six bays with tracery vaults. The four inner bays rest on massive buttresses, forming broad arcades. The corner bays are linked by a diagonal arched construction and show the richly decorated corner pillars. The cloister had a religious function as well as a representative function by its decorative ornamentation and the dynastic symbolic motives, such as the armillarium, coat-of-arms, and the cross from the Order of Christ, showing the growing world power of Portugal.

The inside walls of the cloister have a wealth of Manueline motives with nautical elements, in addition to European, Moorish and Eastern motifs. The round arches and the horizontal structure are clearly in line with the Renaissance architectural style, while at the same time there is also a relationship with Spanish architecture. The decorations on the outer walls of the inner courtyard were made in Plateresco style by Castilho: the arcades include traceried arches that give the construction a filigree aspect.

In one of these arcades is the sober tomb of the poet Fernando Pessoa, while several other tombs in the chapterhouse contain the remains of the poet and playwright Almeida Garrett (1799–1854), the writer-historian Alexandre Herculano (1810–1877), former presidents Teófilo Braga (1843–1924) and Óscar Carmona (1869–1951).

The refectory across the chapter house has several azulejos tiles from the 18th century.

In an addition added to the monastery after the 1850 restoration, the Museu Nacional de Arqueologia (National Archaeological Museum) and the Museu da Marinha (Maritime Museum) were established (in the west wing).

== Gallery ==
South portal

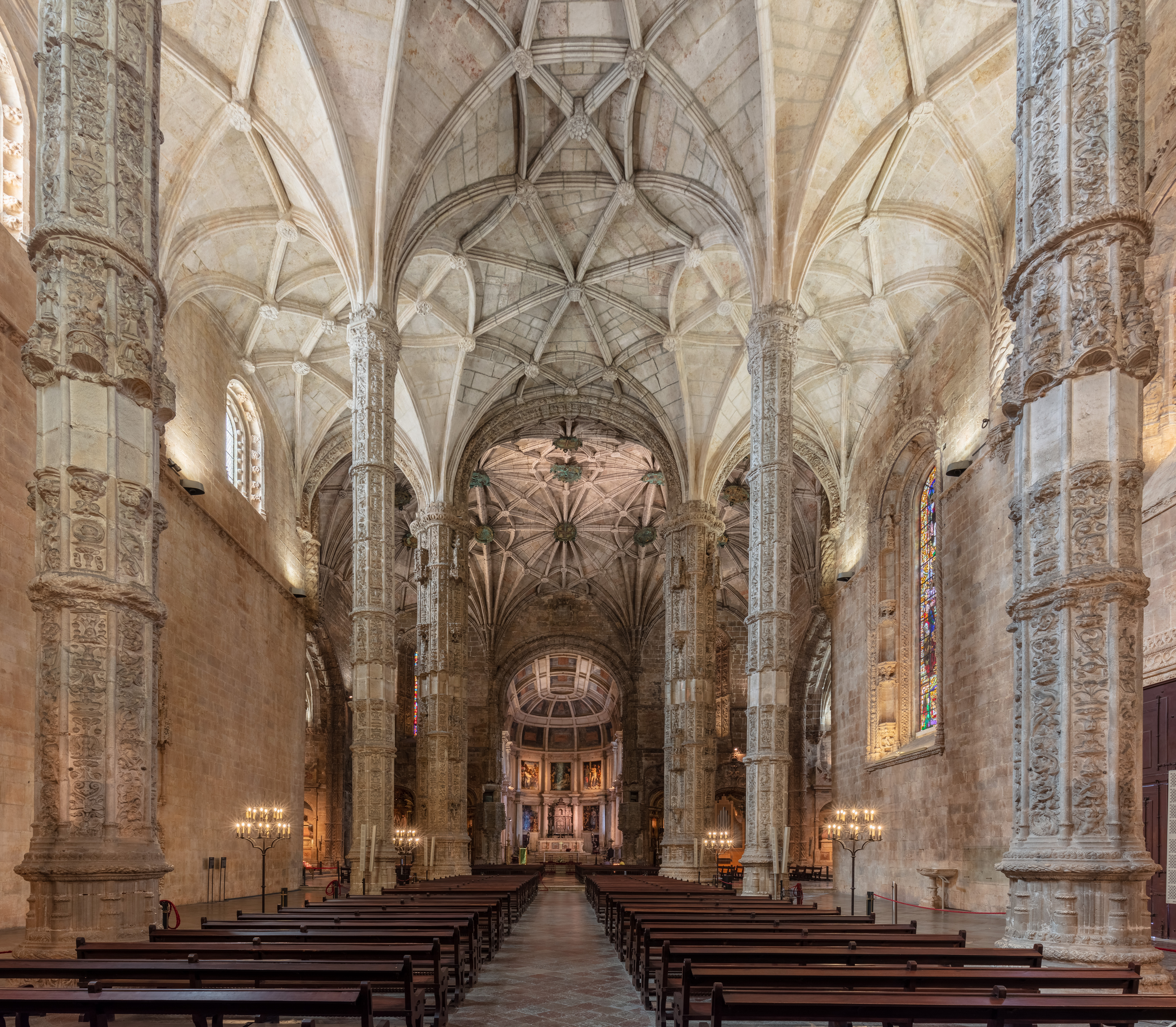
Church interior

Tomb of Vasco da Gama

Tomb of Luís de Camões

Cloister

Cloister, upper floor

Cloister, ground floor

Lion fountain in the cloister
Panoramic view of the monastery
