= Macabre =

Artistic theme of death and decay

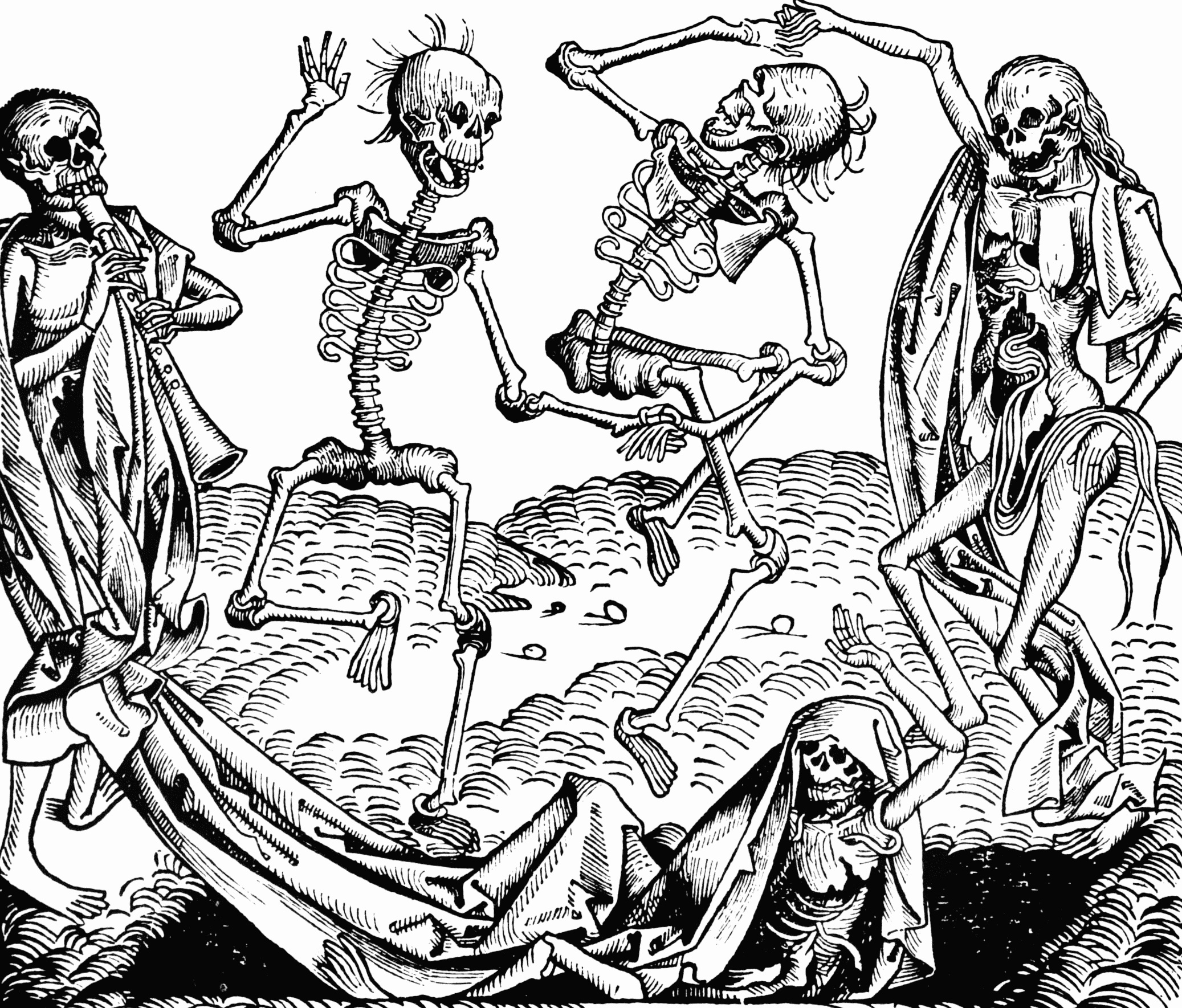
Totentanz ("Dance of the Dead"), illustration from the Nuremberg Chronicle, by Hartmann Schedel (1440–1514)

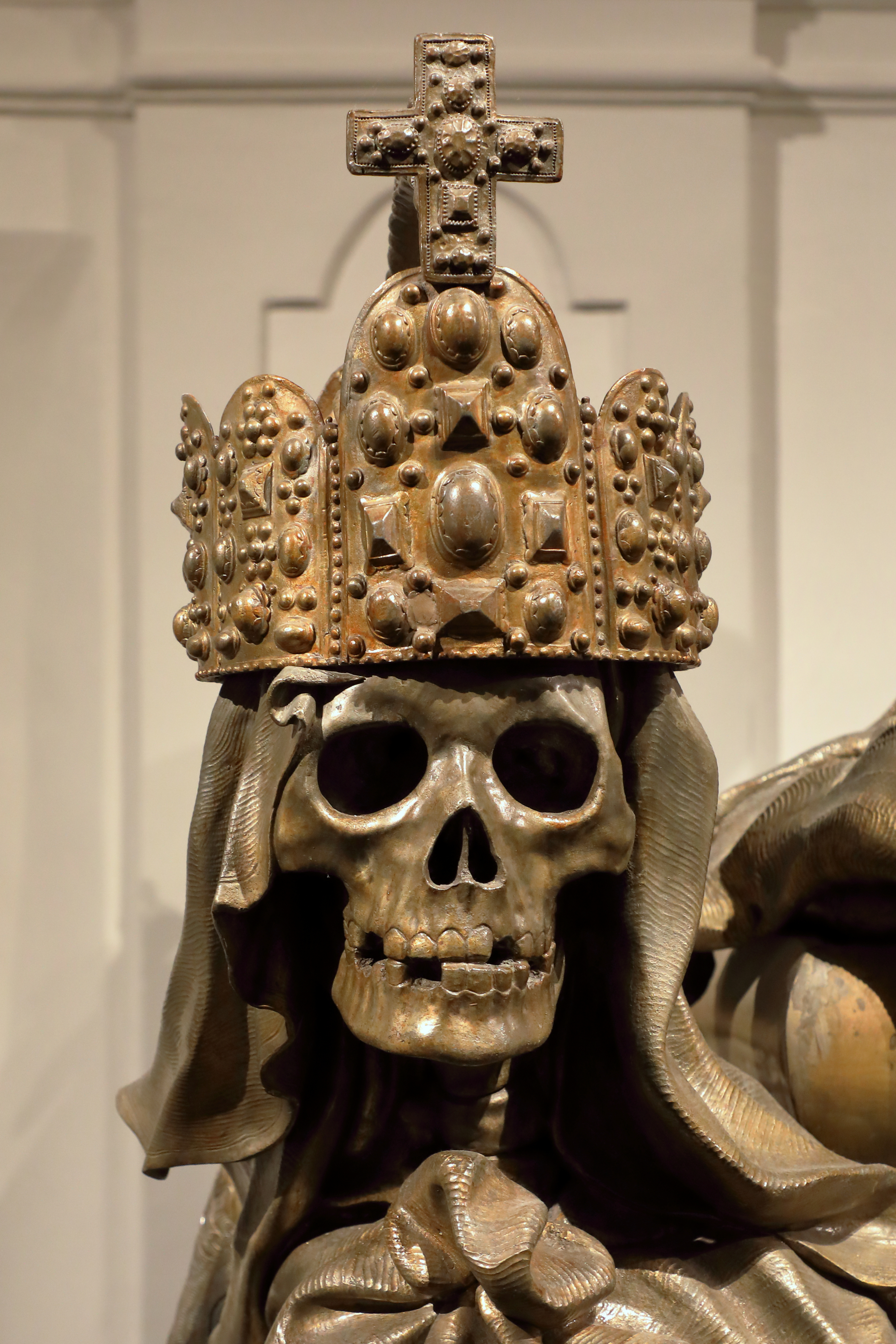
A death head wearing the Imperial Crown of the Holy Roman Empire, on the sarcophagus of Habsburg emperor Charles VI in the crypt of the Capuchin

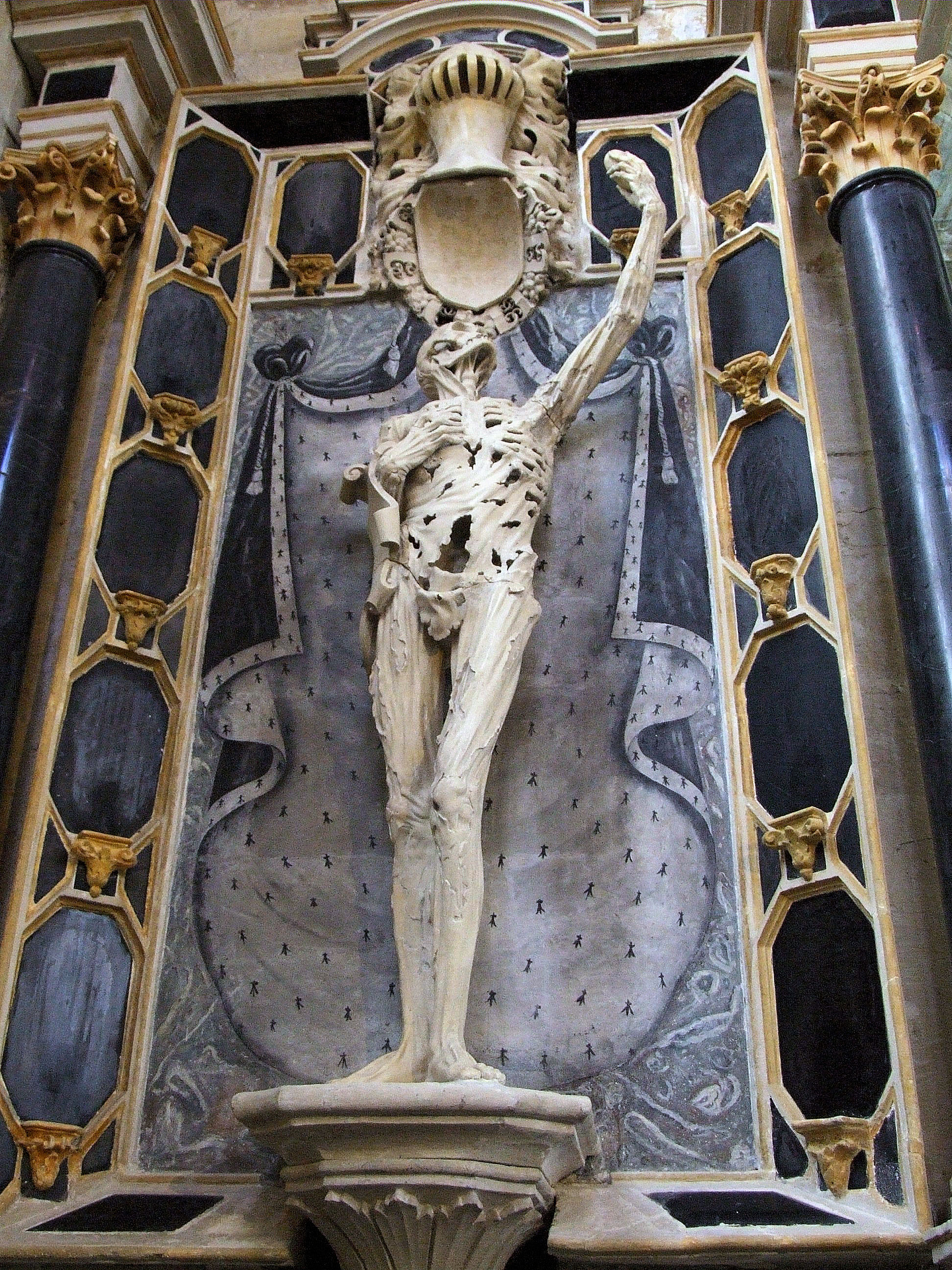
Upper section of the Transi of René de Chalon. Sculpture by Ligier Richier, c. 1545–1547

In art, the term macabre (US: /məˈkɑːb/ or UK: /məˈkɑːbrə/; French: [makabʁ]) means "having a grim or ghastly atmosphere".

The macabre emphasises the details and symbols of death.

== History ==
Early traces of macabre can be found in Ancient Greek and Latin writers such as the Roman writer Petronius, author of the Satyricon (late 1st century CE), and the Numidian writer Apuleius, author of The Golden Ass (late 2nd century AD). Outstanding instances of macabre themes in English literature include the works of John Webster, Robert Louis Stevenson, Mervyn Peake, Charles Dickens, Roald Dahl, Thomas Hardy, and Cyril Tourneur.

The word has gained its significance from its use in French as la danse macabre for the allegorical representation of the ever-present and universal power of death, known in German as Totentanz and later in English as the Dance of the Dead. The typical form which the allegory takes is that of a series of images in which Death appears, either as a dancing skeleton or as a shrunken shrouded corpse, to people representing every age and condition of life, and leads them all in a dance to the grave. Of the numerous examples painted or sculptured on the walls of cloisters or church yards through medieval Europe, few remain except in woodcuts and engravings.

- The series at Basel originally at the Klingenthal, a nunnery in Little Basel, dated from the beginning of the 14th century. In the middle of the 15th century this was moved to the churchyard of the Predigerkloster at Basel, and was restored, probably by Hans Kluber, in 1568. The collapse of the wall in 1805 reduced it to fragments, and only drawings of it remain.
- A Dance of the Dead in its simplest form still survives in the Marienkirche at Lübeck as 15th-century painting on the walls of a chapel. Here there are 24 figures in couples, between each is a dancing Death linking the groups by outstretched hands, the whole ring being led by a Death playing on a pipe.
- In Tallinn (Reval), Estonia there is a well-known Danse Macabre painting by Bernt Notke displayed at St. Nikolaus Church (Niguliste), dating the end of 15th century.
- At Dresden there is a sculptured life-size series in the old Neustädter Kirchhoff, moved here from the palace of Duke George in 1701 after a fire.
- There was a celebrated fresco of the subject in the cloister of Old St Pauls, in London.
- There was another in the now destroyed Hungerford Chapel at Salisbury, of which only a single woodcut, "Death and the Gallant", remains.

The theme continued to inspire artists and musicians long after the medieval period, Schubert's string quartet Death and the Maiden (1824) being one example, and Camille Saint-Saëns' tone poem Danse macabre, op. 40 (1847). In the 20th century, Ingmar Bergman's 1957 film The Seventh Seal has a personified Death, and could thus count as macabre.

The origin of this allegory in painting and sculpture is disputed. It occurs as early as the 14th century, and has often been attributed to the overpowering consciousness of the presence of death due to the Black Death and the miseries of the Hundred Years' War. It has also been attributed to a form of the Morality, a dramatic dialogue between Death and his victims in every station of life, ending in a dance off the stage.

The origin of the peculiar form the allegory has taken has also been found in the dancing skeletons on late Roman sarcophagi and mural paintings at Cumae or Pompeii, and a false connection has been traced with the fresco Trionfo della Morte ("Triumph of Death"), painted by the Italian Renaissance artist Buonamico Buffalmacco (c. 1330s–1350, disputed), and currently preserved in the Campo Santo of Pisa.

== Etymology ==
The etymology of the word "macabre" is uncertain. According to Gaston Paris, French scholar of Romance studies, it first occurs in the form "macabree" in a poem, Respit de la mort (1376), written by the medieval Burgundian chronicler Jean Le Fèvre de Saint-Remy:

Je fis de Macabree la dance,
Qui toute gent maine a sa trace
Et a la fosse les adresse.

The more usual explanation is based on the Latin name, Machabaeorum chorea ("Dance of the Maccabees"). The seven tortured brothers, with their mother and Eleazar (2 Maccabees 6 and 7) are prominent figures in the dramatic dialogues. Other connections have been suggested, as for example with St. Macarius the Great, an Egyptian Coptic monk and hermit who is to be identified with the figure pointing to the decaying corpses in the fresco Trionfo della Morte ("Triumph of Death") painted by the Italian Renaissance artist Buonamico Buffalmacco, according to the Italian art historian Giorgio Vasari; or with the Arabic word maqābir (مقابر, plural of maqbara) which means "cemeteries". A related suggestion has been made that the word originates in Hebrew mqbr meaning "from the grave".

== See also ==
- Black Death in medieval culture
- Cadaver monument
- Danse Macabre, medieval allegory on the universality of death
- Memento mori, symbolic trope acting as a reminder of the inevitability of death
