= Saint-Mihiel Abbey =

Abbey in Meuse, France

Coordinates: 48°53′21″N 5°32′29″E

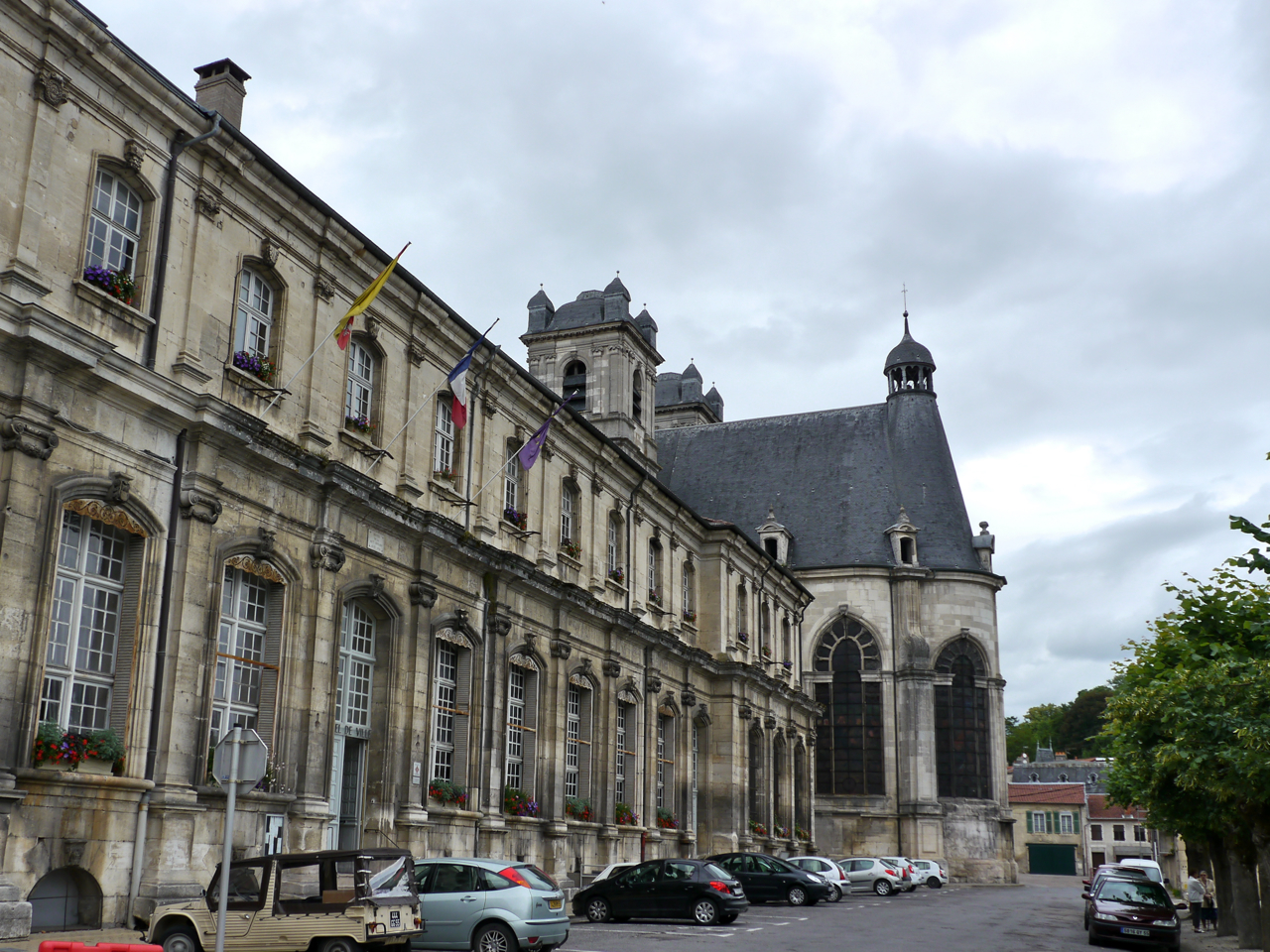

Saint-Mihiel Abbey is an ancient Benedictine abbey situated in the town of Saint-Mihiel, near Verdun in the Meuse department in Lorraine in north-eastern France.

== History ==
The benedictine abbey was built in 708 or 709 by a Count Wulfoalde and his wife Adalsinde, probably to house the relics that Wulfoalde had brought back from Italy. It was dedicated to Saint Michael the Archangel, a popular saint at the time, as can be testified by the establishment of the abbeys of Mont St Michel in Normandy and the Abbey of Honau in Alsace in the same period.

The abbey was placed under the authority of Fulrad of St Denis, chaplain to Charlemagne. In 755 a mayor Wulfoald, probably a relative of the founder of the abbey, was accused of high treason and plotting against Pepin the Short, was condemned to death. When Fulrad intervened to save his life, Wulfoald expressed his gratitude by giving King Childéric II his possessions, including the Abbey. The Abbey was famous for its relics, not least of which concerned Saint Anatole, Bishop of Cahors, whose body was reputed to have been transferred to Mihiel in 779.

The Abbey is best known for its abbot Smaragdus, who moved there around the year 814 with his monks from the monastery on Mt. Castellion.

Some time between 816 and 826 Smaragdus obtained royal protection for the abbey from Louis the Pious, ensuring that wagons, pack-horses and ships would be exempt from customs taxes on goods transported between the monastery and its lands. Smaragdus achieved fame as a writer of homilies, and for his writings on the Rule of St Benedict. Smaragdus, who died around 840, was succeeded as abbot by Hadegaudus, who was probably elected by the monks themselves. In 895, Zwentibold of Lotharingia augmented the endowment supporting the monks of Saint-Mihiel with 45 mansi, a mill, and two chapels. This charter was confirmed in 908 by Louis the Child and in 915 by Charles the Simple.

Abbots in the tenth century included Odon I, followed by Sarovard, followed by Odon II, who died in 995.

Over the years, the abbey proved very popular with royalty, emperors and kings and dukes. In the 11th century, for example, it came under the protection of Gérard, Duke of Lorraine.

In 1734 the tombs of both Wulfoalde and Adalsinde were discovered in the abbey.

The Abbey was dissolved during the French revolution.

== The Church of Saint Michel ==
The Abbey Church is known as the Church of Saint Michel. Part of the 11th century porch still remains. The nave was rebuilt in the 16th century and modified in the 17th century.

The Church contains a walnut sculpture of the swooning of Mary by Ligier Richier dated 1531 (or 1537).

== The library ==
Today the Abbey is best known for its library. The library is still on the original site, which it now shares with a school and, since 1978, with the town hall. The collections include 8780 books including 86 incunabula, 74 manuscripts from the ninth to the sixteenth centuries. It is housed in a purpose-built building, constructed in 1775. It is managed as a special collection by the municipal library. A number of the more valuable works are available online in digital form. The most famous of these is a 9th-century manuscript on the Holy Trinity by Pseudo-Athanasius, which was stolen during World War one, but discovered in a Hamburg bookshop in 2007 and reintegrated into the collection.

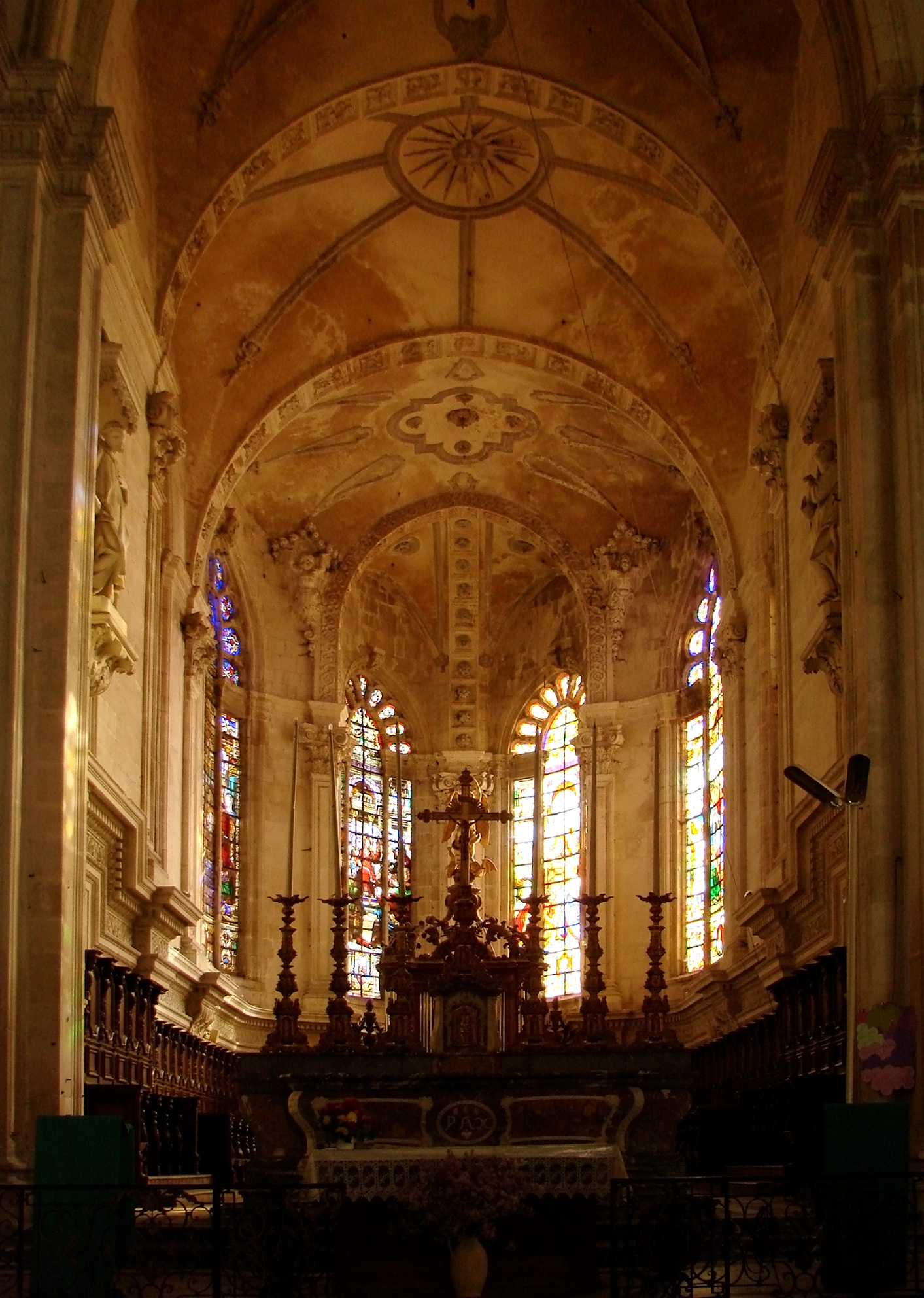
Altar of the Abbey church of Saint Michel, Saint-Mihiel.

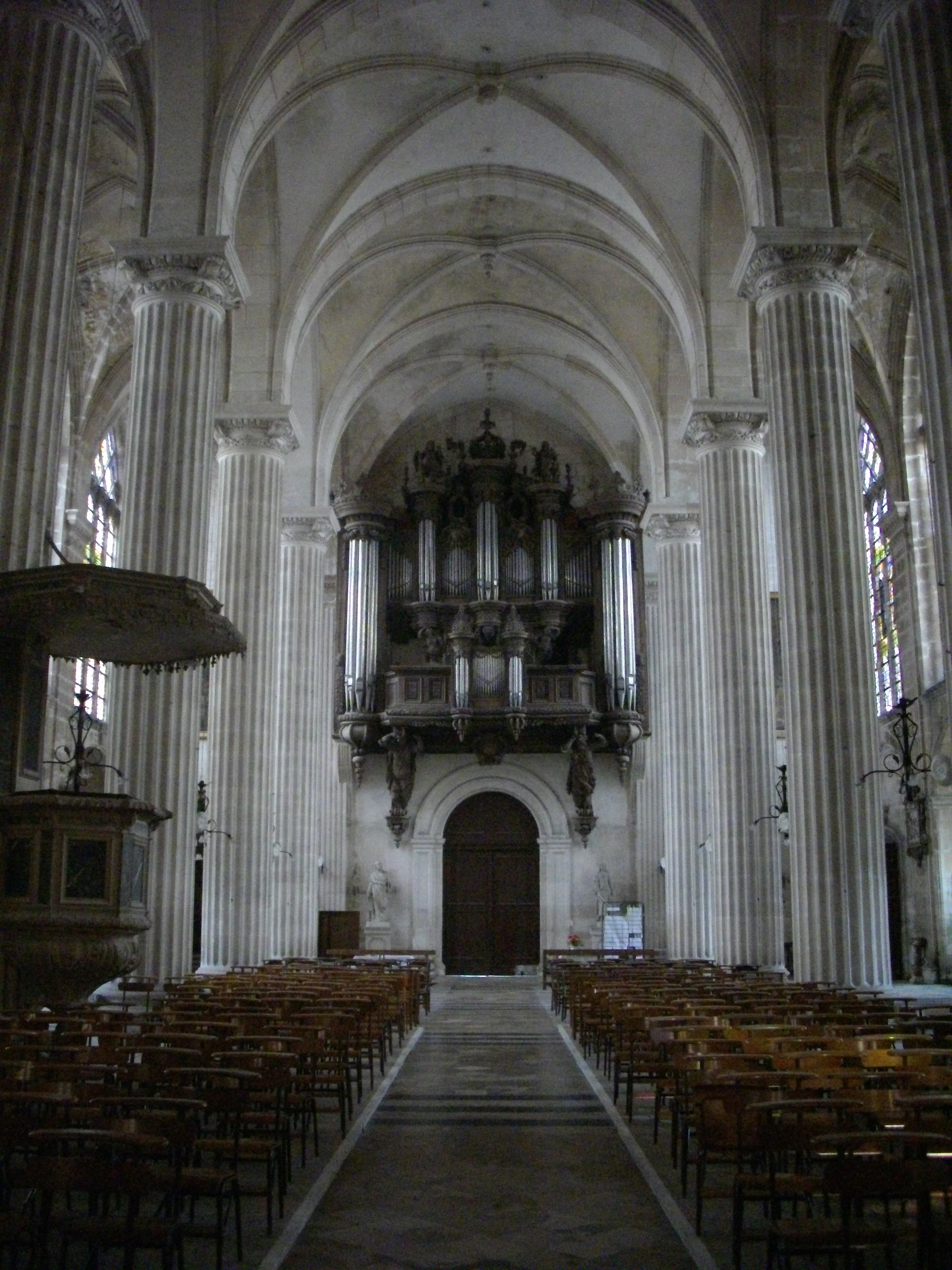
Church of Saint Michel with organ loft.

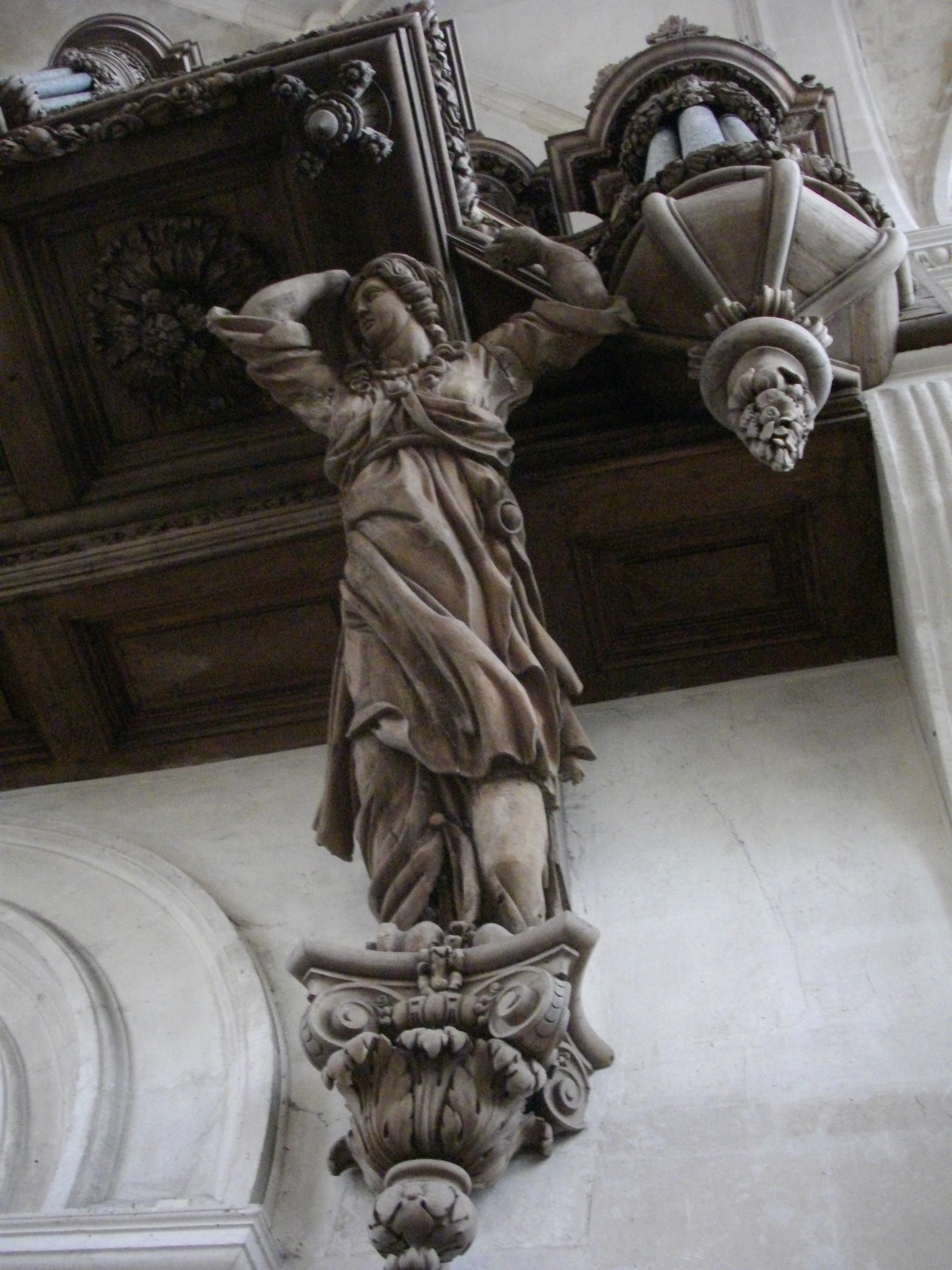
Detail of the organ.

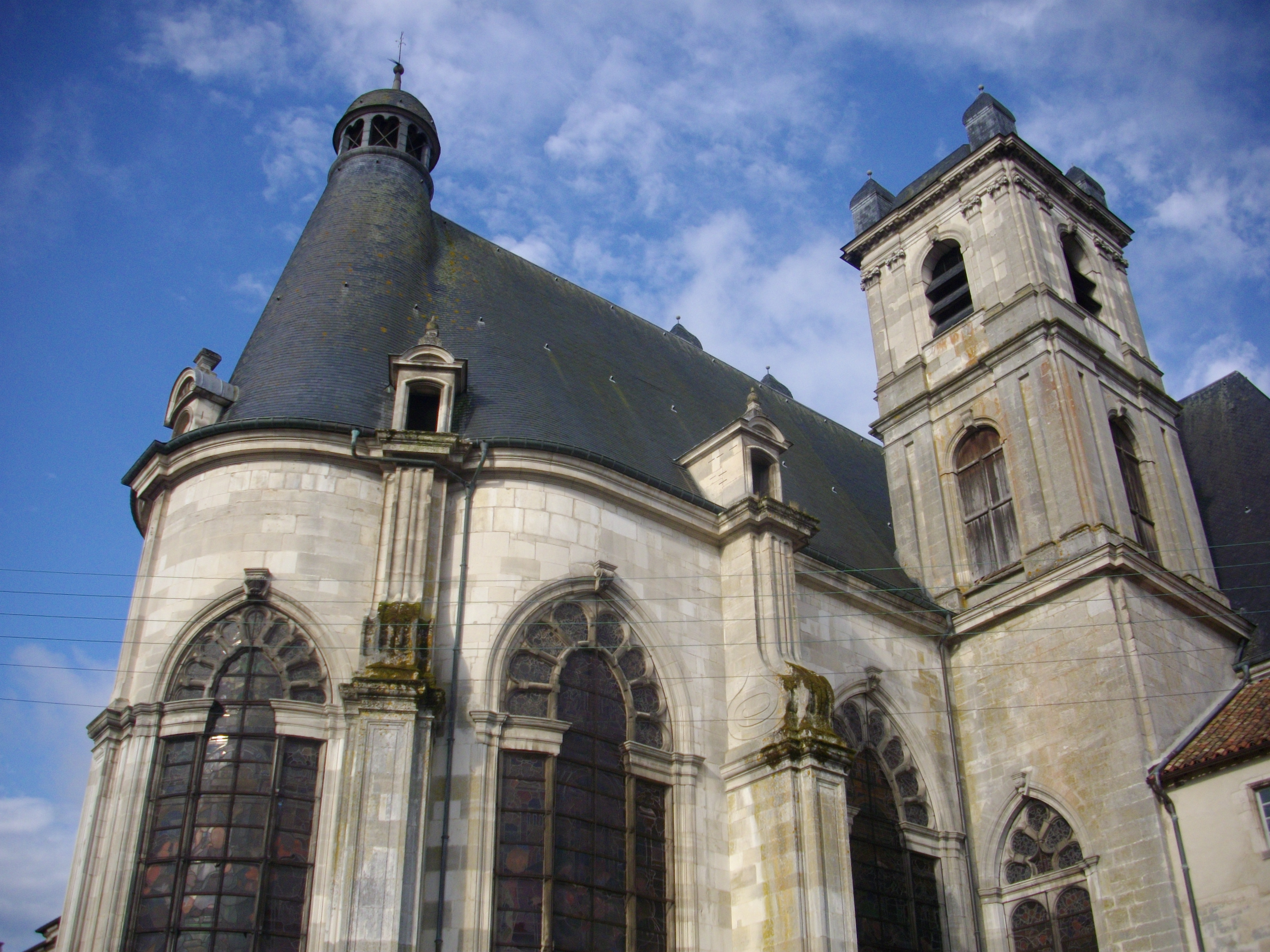
Apse.

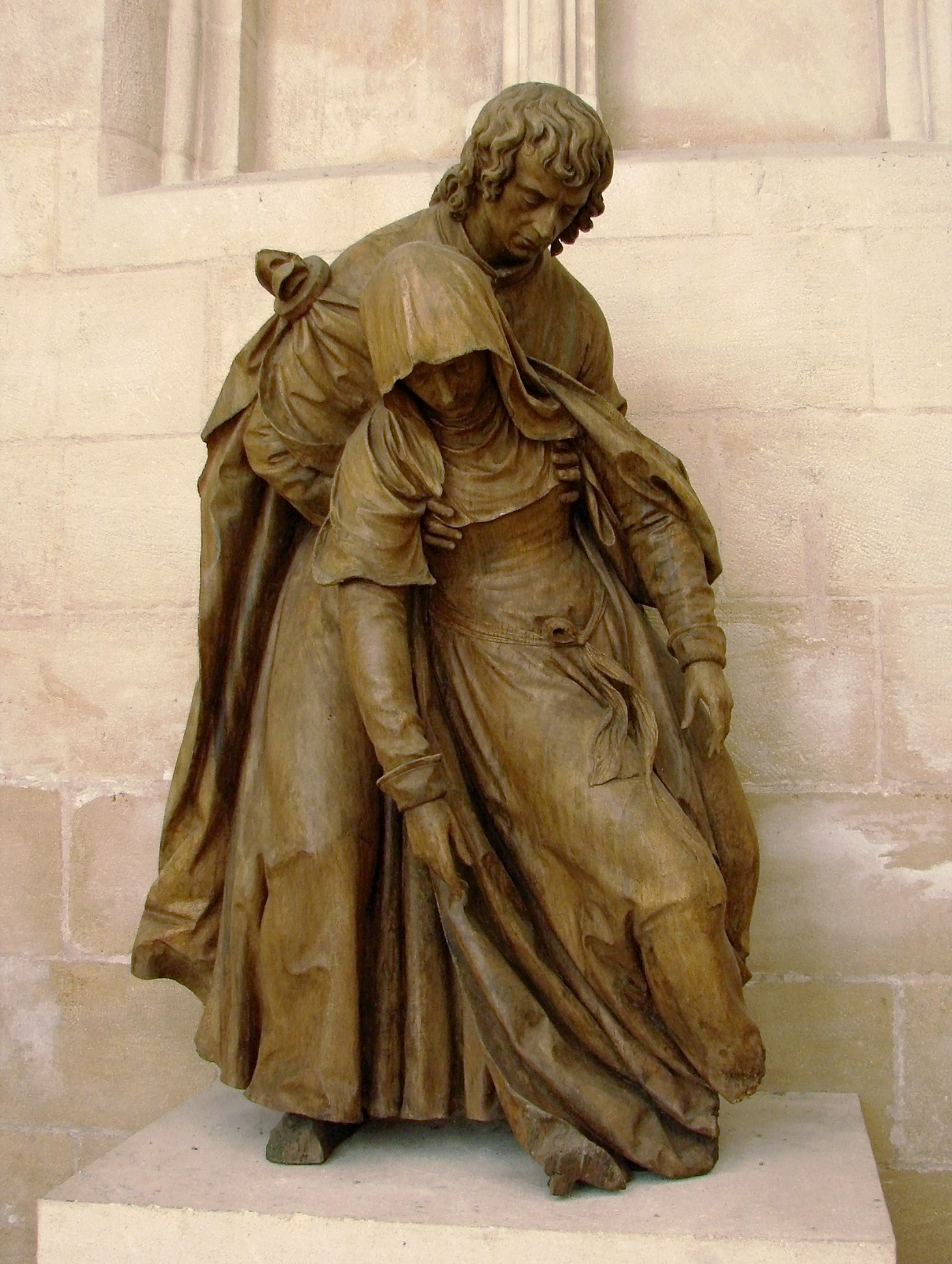
Swoon of the virgin by Richier

== Cartulary of Saint-Mihiel ==
A cartulary of Saint-Mihiel was composed towards the end of the 11th century and is preserved in the Meuse Departmental Archives at Bar-le-Duc.

== Sources ==
- Bernhardt, John W. (1987). "Servitium Regis and Monastic Property in Early Medieval Germany". Viator Medieval & Renaissance Studies. 18: 53–88.
