= Cadaver monument =

Effigy tombs or slabs depicting decomposition

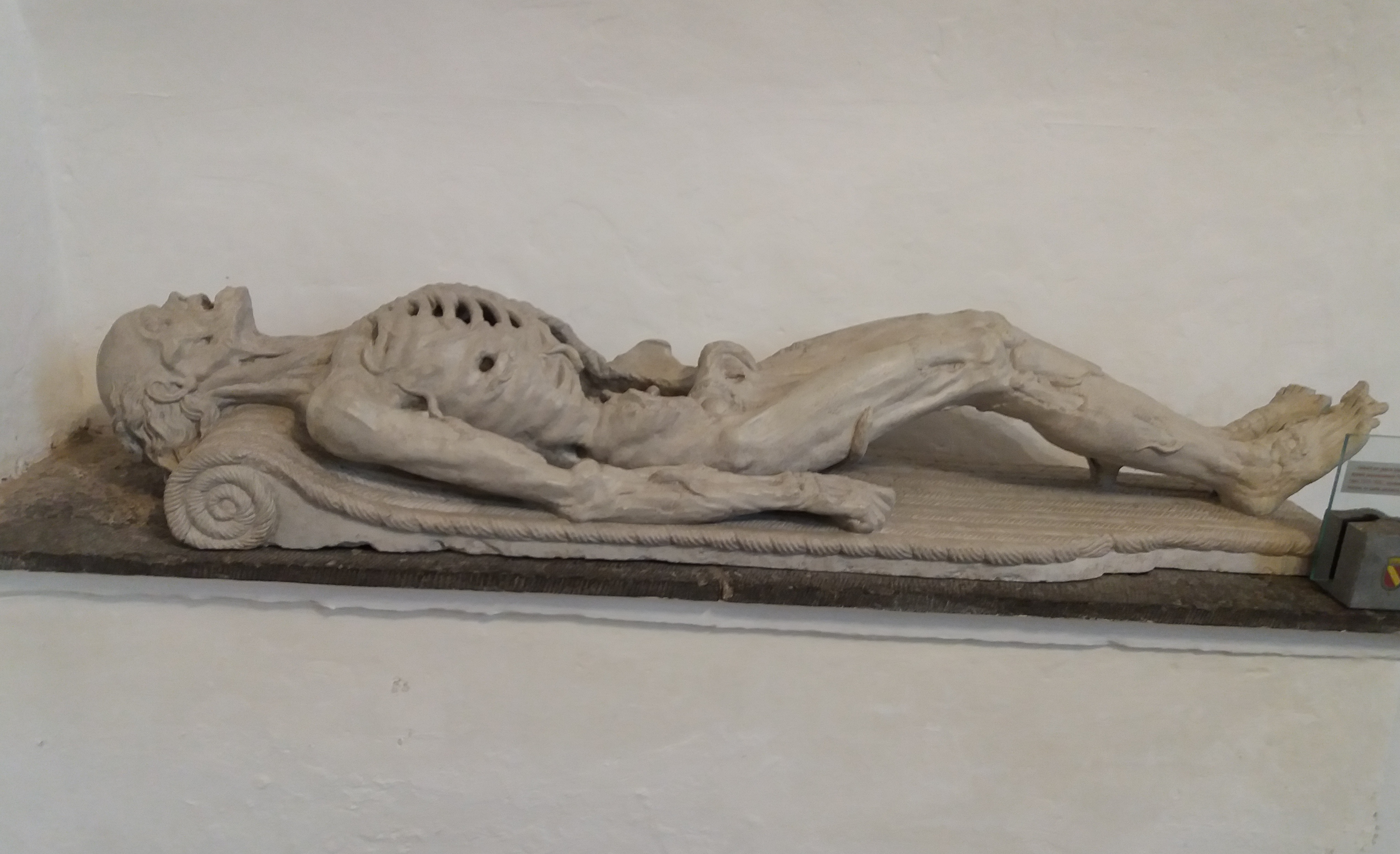
Tomb effigy in the mausoleum of the Lords of Boussu, Boussu Castle, Belgium

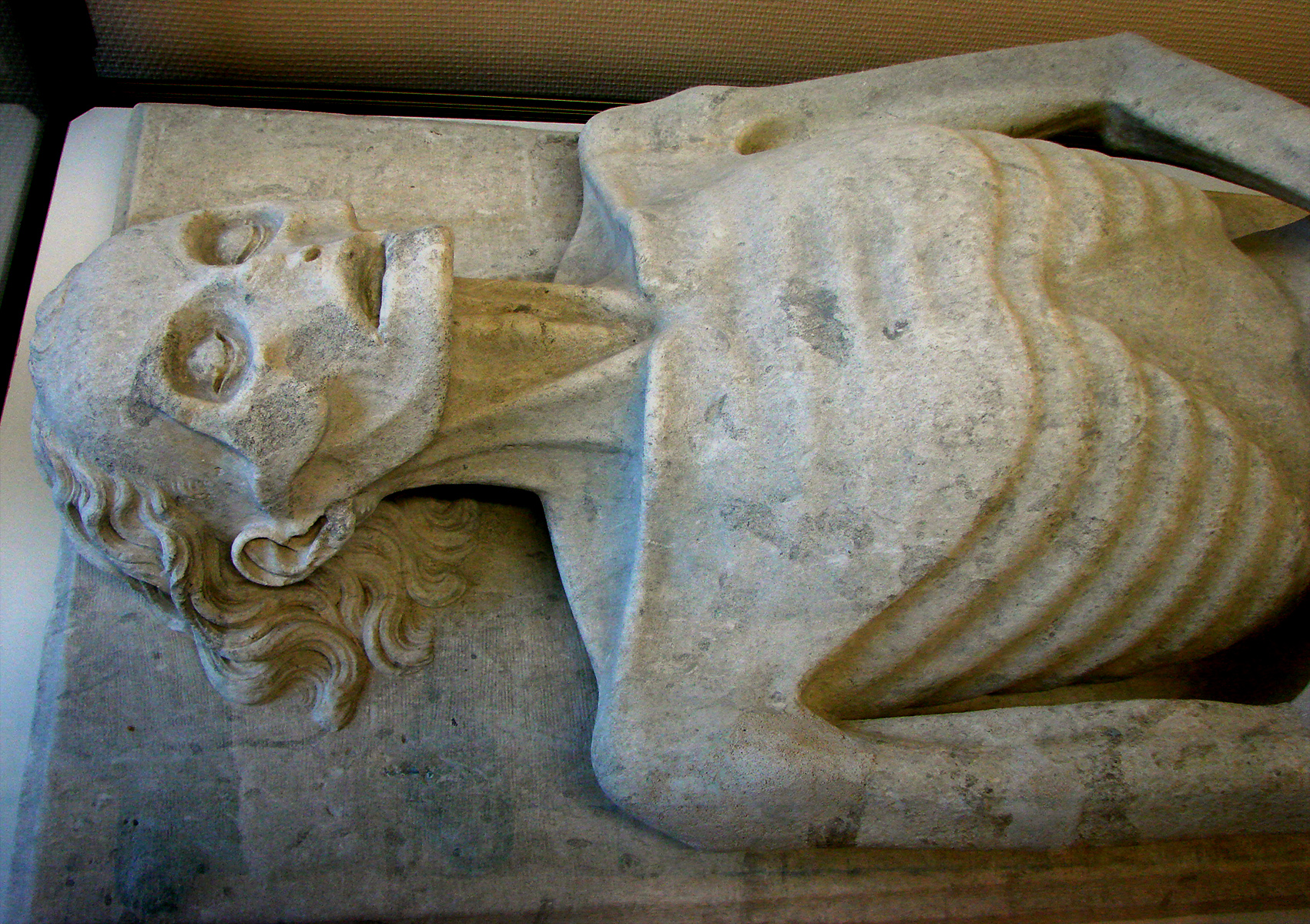
Cadaver Tomb of Guillaume de Harsigny. Musée d'art et d'archéologie de Laon, France

A cadaver monument or transi is a type of funerary monument to a deceased person, featuring a sculpted tomb effigy of a skeleton, or of an emaciated or decomposing dead body, with closed eyes. It was particularly characteristic of the Late Middle Ages when they were designed as a memento mori to remind viewers of the transience and vanity of mortal life compared to the eternity and desirability of the Christian after-life. The format is in stark contrast to gisants, which are always recumbent, in full dress, with open eyes and hands clasped and raised in prayer.

Cadaver monuments first appeared in the 1380s and remained a popular form of funerary art for 200 subsequent years. In a still widely debated theory popularized by the historians Helen M. Roe and John Aberth, cadaver monuments are often interpreted as a form of memento mori or adaption of the motif of "The Three Living and the Three Dead". They show the human body's "transition" from life to decomposition, highlighting the contrast between worldly riches and elegance and the degradation of death.

Over the centuries, the depictions became more realistic and gruesome, while earlier tendencies to line the tombs with moralizing inscriptions on the vanities of life were abandoned. The morbid art form reached its peak in the late 16th century, with more extreme effigies depicting putrefied corpses outside of the funerary monument context, and taking centre stage as stand-alone sculptures.

== Development ==
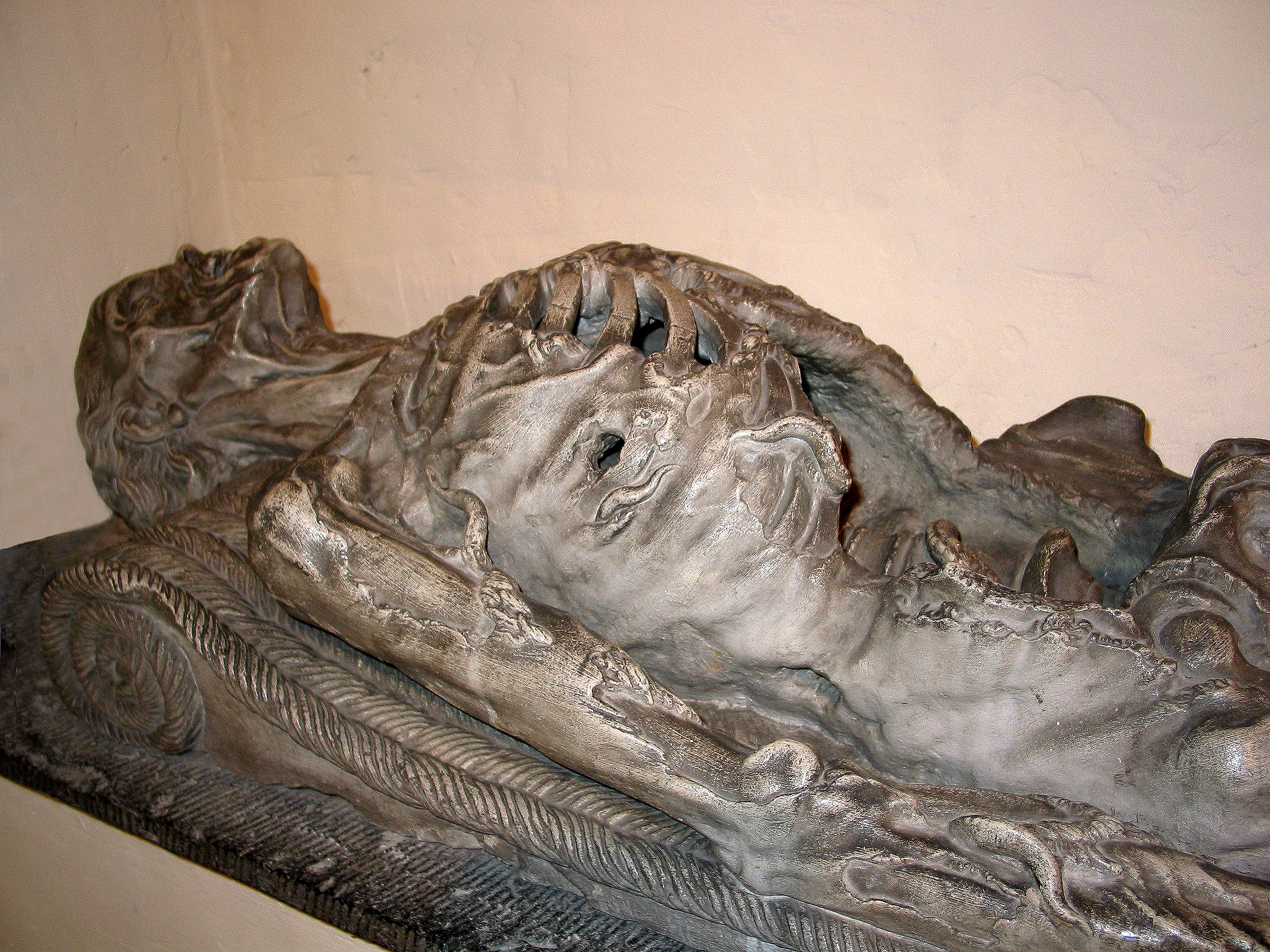
"L'homme aux moulons" (man eaten by worms), a 16th-century cadaver monument in Boussu, Belgium

A depiction of a rotting cadaver in art (as opposed to a skeleton) is called a transi. However, the term "cadaver monument" can really be applied to other varieties of monuments, e.g., with skeletons or with the deceased completely wrapped in a shroud. In the "double-decker" monuments, in Erwin Panofsky's phrase, a sculpted stone bier displays on the top level the recumbent effigy (or gisant) of a living person, where they may be life-sized and sometimes represented kneeling in prayer, and in dramatic contrast as a rotting cadaver on the bottom level, often shrouded and sometimes in company of worms and other flesh-eating creatures. The iconography is regionally distinct: the depiction of such animals on these cadavers is more commonly found on the European mainland, and especially in the German regions. The dissemination of cadaver imagery in the late-medieval danse macabre may also have influenced the iconography of cadaver monuments.

In Christian funerary art, cadaver monuments were a dramatic departure from the usual practice of depicting the deceased as they were in life, for example recumbent but with hands together in prayer, or even as dynamic military figures drawing their swords, such as the 13th- and 14th-century effigies surviving in the Temple Church, London. Cadaver monuments often acted as a portrait of the deceased in death.

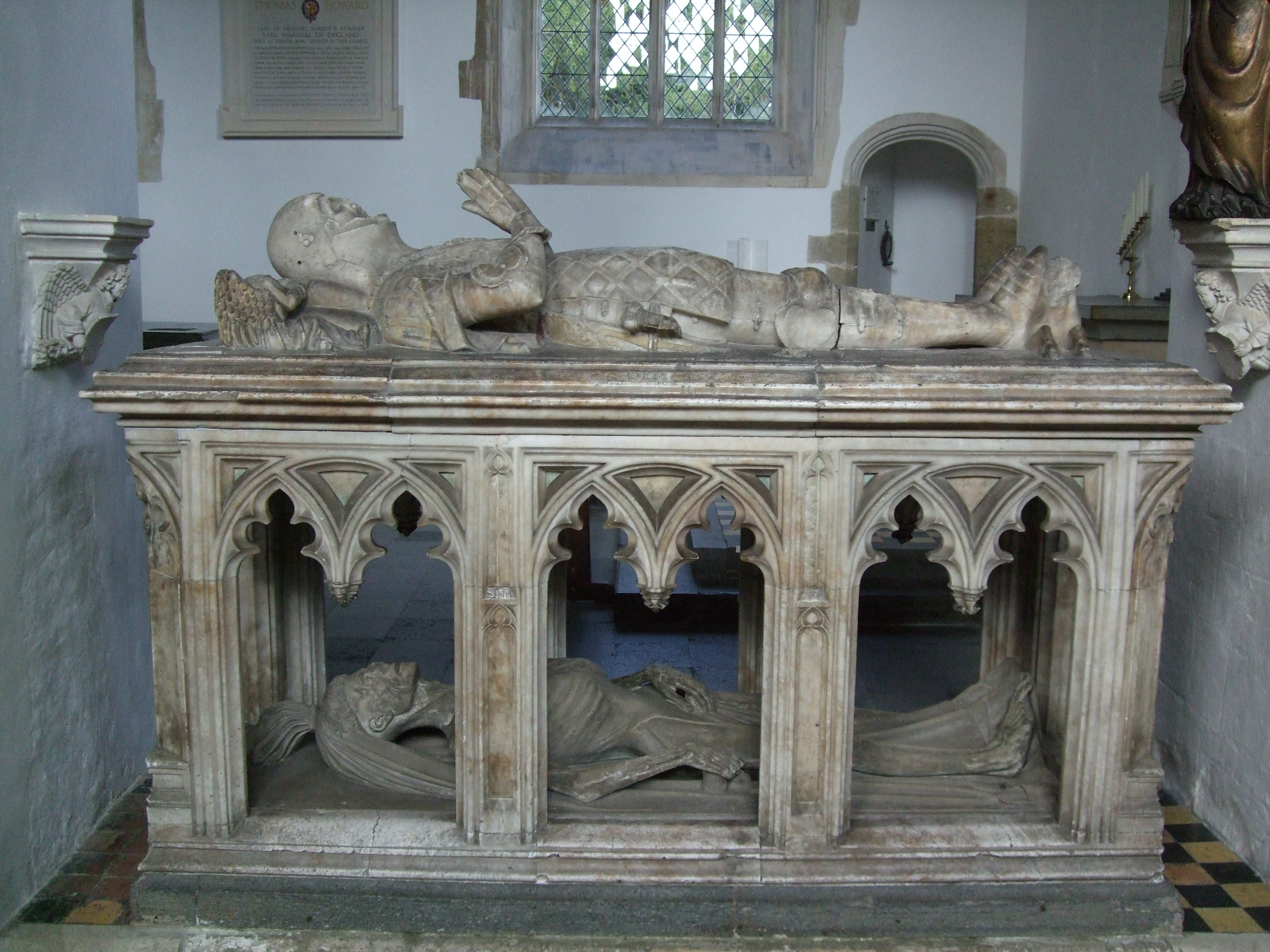
Cadaver monument of John Fitzalan, 7th Earl of Arundel (died 1435), Fitzalan Chapel, Arundel Castle, West Sussex, England

The term can also be used for a monument which shows only the cadaver without a corresponding representation of the living person. The sculpture is intended as a didactic example of how transient earthly glory is, since it depicts what all people of every status finally become. Kathleen Cohen's study of five French ecclesiastics who commissioned transi monuments determined that common to all of them was a successful worldliness that seemed almost to demand a shocking display of transient mortality. A classic example is the "Transi de René de Chalons" by Ligier Richier, in the church of Saint Etienne in Bar-le-Duc, France, pictured below right.

Cadaver monuments were made only for high-ranking persons, usually royalty, bishops, abbots or nobility, because one had to be wealthy to have one made, and influential enough to be allotted space for one in a church of limited capacity. Some monuments for royalty were double tombs, for both a king and queen. The French kings Louis XII, Francis I and Henry II were doubly portrayed, as couples both as living effigies and as naked cadavers, in their double double-decker monuments in the Basilica of Saint-Denis near Paris. Other varieties also exist, such as cadaver imagery on incised slabs and monumental brasses, including the so-called "shroud brasses", of which many survive in England.

== Countries ==
=== France ===
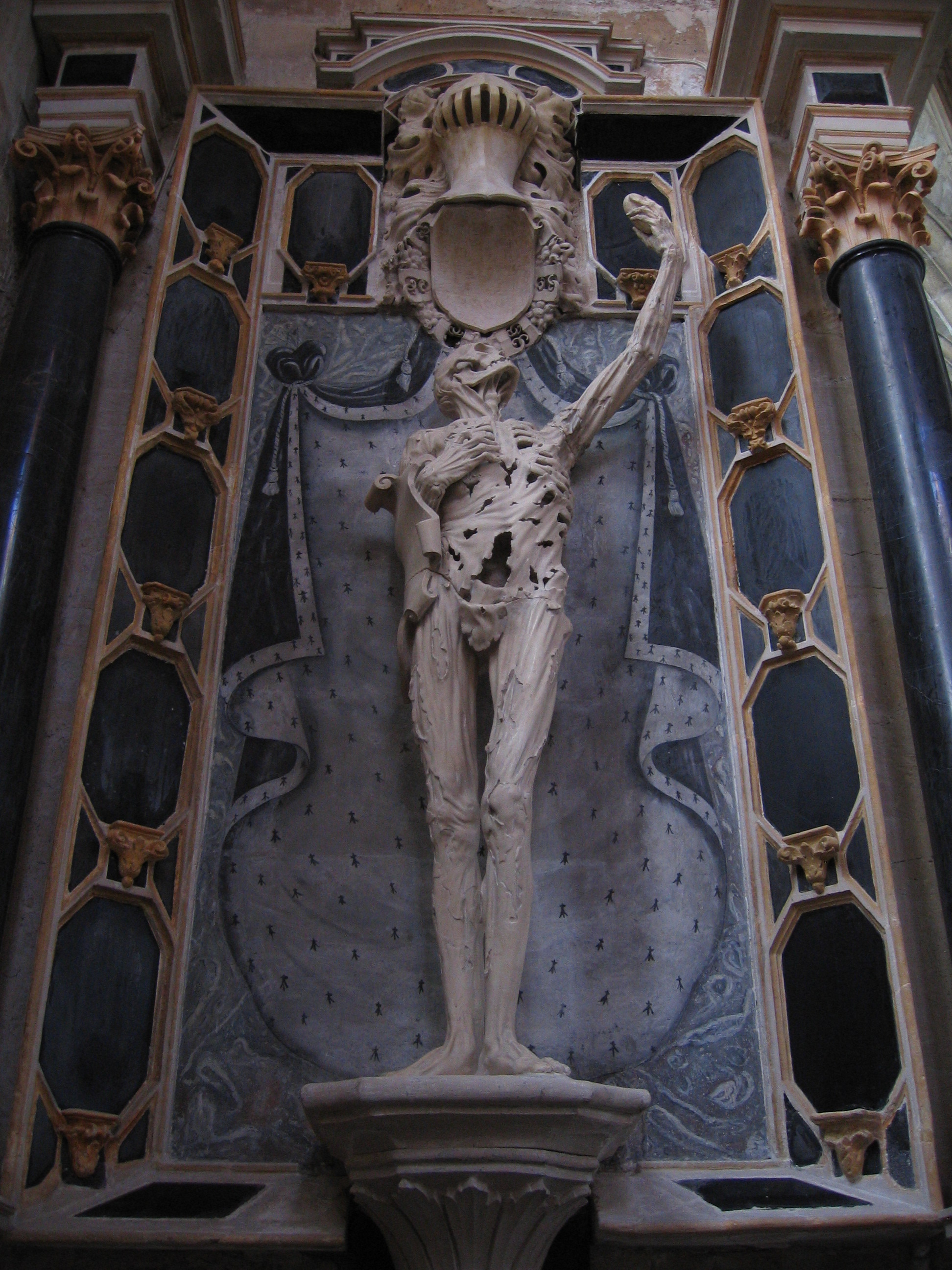
Cadaver monument of René de Chalon, Church of St. Étienne, Bar-le-Duc, France, by Ligier Richier

France has a long history of cadaver monuments, though not as many examples or varieties survive as in England. One of the earliest and anatomically convincing examples is the gaunt cadaver effigy of the medieval physician Guillaume de Harsigny (d. 1393) at Laon. Another early example is the effigy on the multi-layered wall-monument of Cardinal Jean de La Grange (died 1402) in Avignon. Kathleen Cohen lists many further extant examples. A revival of the form occurred in the Renaissance, as testified by the two examples to Louis XII and his wife Anne of Brittany at Saint-Denis, and of Queen Catherine de' Medici who commissioned a cadaver monument for her husband Henry II.

=== England ===
The earliest known transi monument is the very faint matrix (i.e., indent) of a now lost monumental brass shrouded demi-effigy on the ledger stone slab commemorating "John the Smith" (c.1370) at St Bartholomew’s Church in Brightwell Baldwin in Oxfordshire. In the 15th century the sculpted transi effigy made its appearance in England. Cadaver monuments survive in many English cathedrals and parish churches. The earliest surviving one is in Lincoln Cathedral, to Bishop Richard Fleming who founded Lincoln College, Oxford and died in 1431. Canterbury Cathedral houses the well-known cadaver monument to Henry Chichele, Archbishop of Canterbury (died 1443) and in Exeter Cathedral survives the 16th-century monument and chantry chapel of Precentor Sylke, inscribed in Latin: "I am what you will be, and I was what you are. Pray for me I beseech you." Winchester Cathedral has two cadaver monuments; Wells Cathedral has a cadaver monument to Bishop Thomas Beckington (died 1465).

The cadaver monument traditionally identified as that of John Wakeman, Abbot of Tewkesbury from 1531 to 1539, survives in Tewkesbury Abbey. Following the dissolution of the monasteries, he retired and later became the first Bishop of Gloucester. The monument, with vermin crawling on a sculpted skeletal corpse, may have been prepared for him, but his body was in fact buried at Forthampton in Gloucestershire.

A rarer, modern type is the standing, shrouded effigy type exemplified by the tomb of the poet John Donne (d. 1631) in the crypt of St Paul's Cathedral in London. Similar examples from the Early Modern period signify faith in the Resurrection.

=== Italy ===
Cadaver monuments are found in many Italian churches. Andrea Bregno sculpted several of them, including those of Cardinal Alain de Coëtivy in Santa Prassede, Ludovico Cardinal d'Albert at Santa Maria in Ara Coeli and Bishop Juan Díaz de Coca in Santa Maria sopra Minerva in Rome. Three other prominent monuments are those of Cardinal Matteo d'Acquasparta in Santa Maria in Ara Coeli and those of Bishop Gonsalvi (1298) and of Cardinal Gonsalvo (1299) in Santa Maria Maggiore, all sculpted by Giovanni de Cosma, the youngest of the Cosmati family lineage.

=== Germany and the Netherlands ===
Many cadaver monuments and ledger stones survive in Germany and the Netherlands. An impressive example is the 16th-century Van Brederode double-decker monument at Vianen near Utrecht, which depicts Reynoud van Brederode (d. 1556) and his wife Philippote van der Marck (d. 1537) as shrouded figures on the upper level, with a single verminous cadaver below.

=== Ireland ===
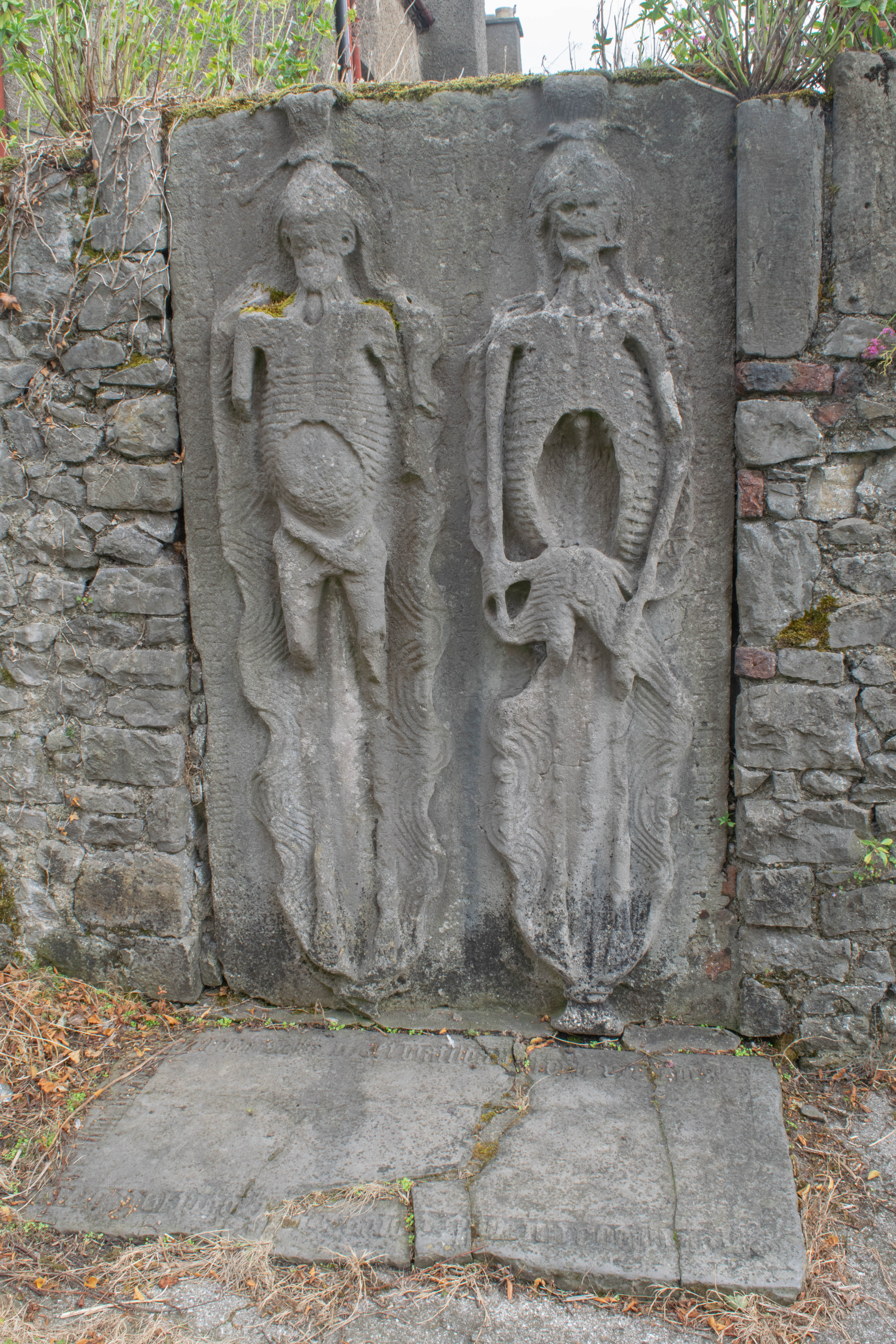
Cadaver stone of Sir Edmond Goldyng and his wife, in Drogheda, Ireland

A total of 11 cadaver monuments have been recorded in Ireland, many of which are no longer in situ. The earliest complete record of these monuments was compiled by Helen M. Roe in 1969. The monumental limestone slab known as "The Modest Man", dedicated to Thomas Ronan (d. 1554) and his wife Johanna Tyrry (d. 1569) is in the Triskel Christchurch in Cork. A variant form is the Cadaver Stones, which lack any sculpted superstructure or canopy. These may merely be sculptural elements removed from more elaborate now lost monuments, as is the case with the stone of Sir Edmond Goldyng and his wife Elizabeth Fleming, built in the early 16th century into the churchyard wall of St. Peter's Church of Ireland, Drogheda.

== Sources ==
- Barker, Jessica. Revisiting The Monument: Fifty Years since Panofsky’s Tomb Sculpture. London: Courtauld Institute of Art, 2016. ISBN 978-1-9074-850-6-0
- Bass, Marisa Anne. "The transi tomb and the genius of sixteenth century Netherlandish funerary sculpture". Netherlands Yearbook for the History of Art, volume 67, 2017. JSTOR 26593102
- Heimerman, Emily. "A Portrait of Death: Analyzing the Transi Tomb of Guillaume de Harcigny (1300–1393 A.D.) Archived 2023-05-24 at the Wayback Machine". Coalition of Master’s Scholars on Material Culture, April 2, 2021
- Panofsky, Erwin. Tomb Sculpture: Its Changing Aspects from Ancient Egypt to Bernini. London: Harry Abrams, 1964. ISBN 978-0-8109-3870-0
- Roe, Helen M. "Cadaver Effigial Monuments in Ireland". Journal of the Royal Society of Antiquaries of Ireland, volume 99, No. 1, 1969. p. 4. JSTOR 25509699
- Welch, Christina. "For Prayers and Pedagogy: Contextualising English Carved Cadaver Monuments of the Late-Medieval Social and Religious Elite". Fieldwork in Religion, Equinox Publishing, 2012
