= Guillaume de Harsigny =

Physician

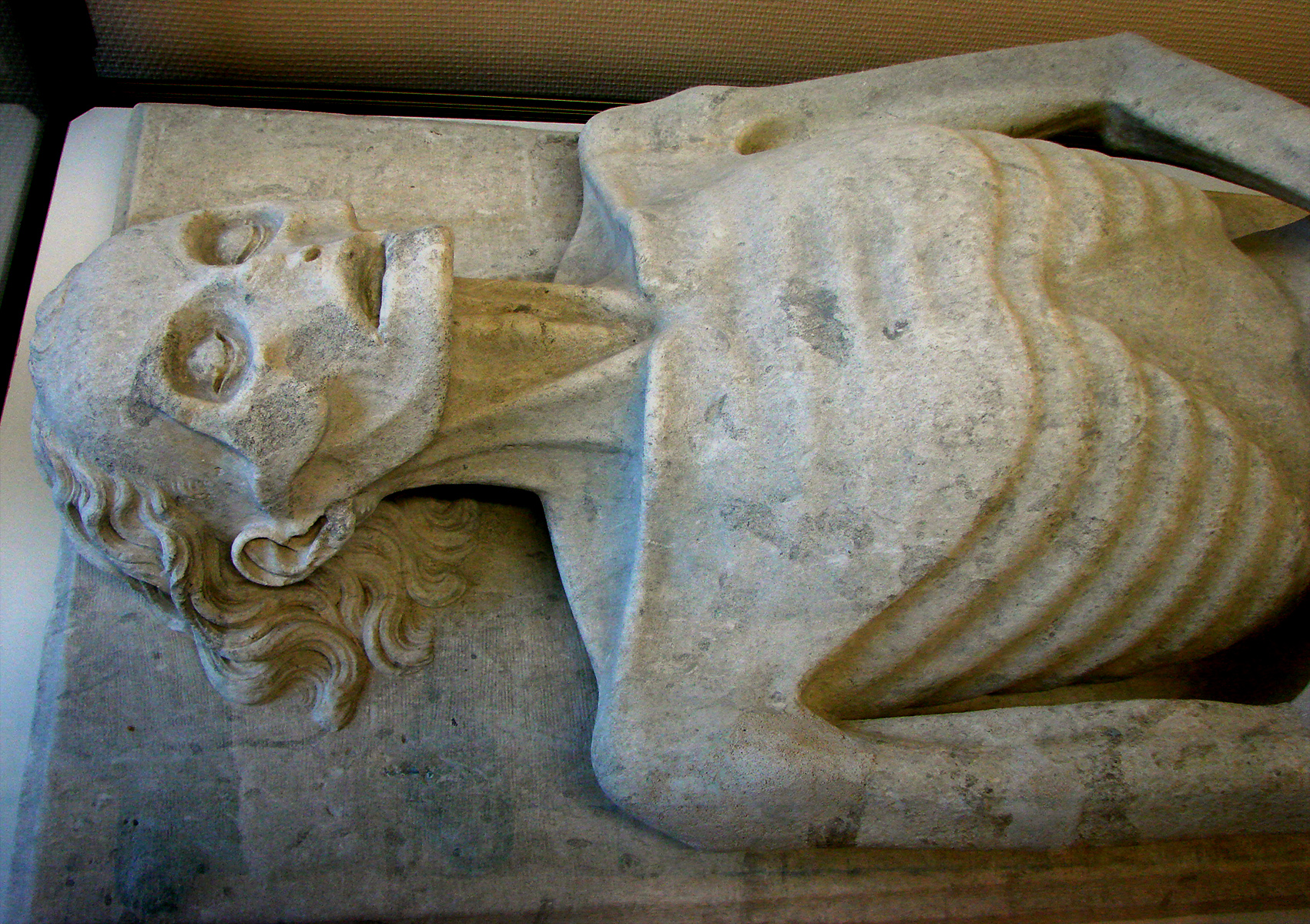
Tomb of Guillaume de Harsigny, Musée d'Art et d'Archéologie, Laon

Guillaume de Harsigny (c. 1300 – 10 July 1393) (Note: Some sources give a birthdate of 1310.) was a French doctor, a court physician to Charles V of France, and one of the most notable physicians of his time.

His tomb and effigy in the Musée d'art et d'archéologie de Laon (Musée de Laon) is well known as one of the earliest known French cadaver monuments (transi).

== Life ==
Harsigny studied medicine in Paris, where he also obtained his doctorate. He traveled across the Mediterranean, notably to Italy, Palestine, Syria, and Egypt, visiting centers of medical scholarship such as the Schola Medica Salernitana. Having expanded his knowledge, he returned to his homeland, Picardy, where, in the course of the plague epidemics of the Black Death, he gained a reputation as one of the best doctors in France. Thus, he became the personal physician of the powerful feudal lord Enguerrand VII de Coucy. During this time, he learned new medical techniques and compiled information from medical manuscripts.

When king Charles VI of France suffered a nervous breakdown in August 1392 near Le Mans, during a campaign against Brittany, unexpectedly attacked his own companions, killing some of them and falling into a coma himself, he was already abandoned by his doctors. It was only under the care of the aged Harsigny that the king recovered. This unexpected cure was the culmination of Harsigny's medical career.

Harcigny died in his home in Laon, France, in 1393, at 93 years of age.

== Bibliography ==
- Glain, Stephen. (2005). Mullahs, Merchants, and Militants: The Economic Collapse of the Arab World. St. Martin's Griffin. ISBN 978-0-312-32912-9
- Tuchman, Barbara. (1978). A Distant Mirror: The Calamitous 14th Century. New York: Ballantine. ISBN 978-0-345-34957-6
