= Cadaver Tomb of Guillaume de Harsigny =

1394 cadaver monument

Cadaver tomb of Guillaume de Harsigny
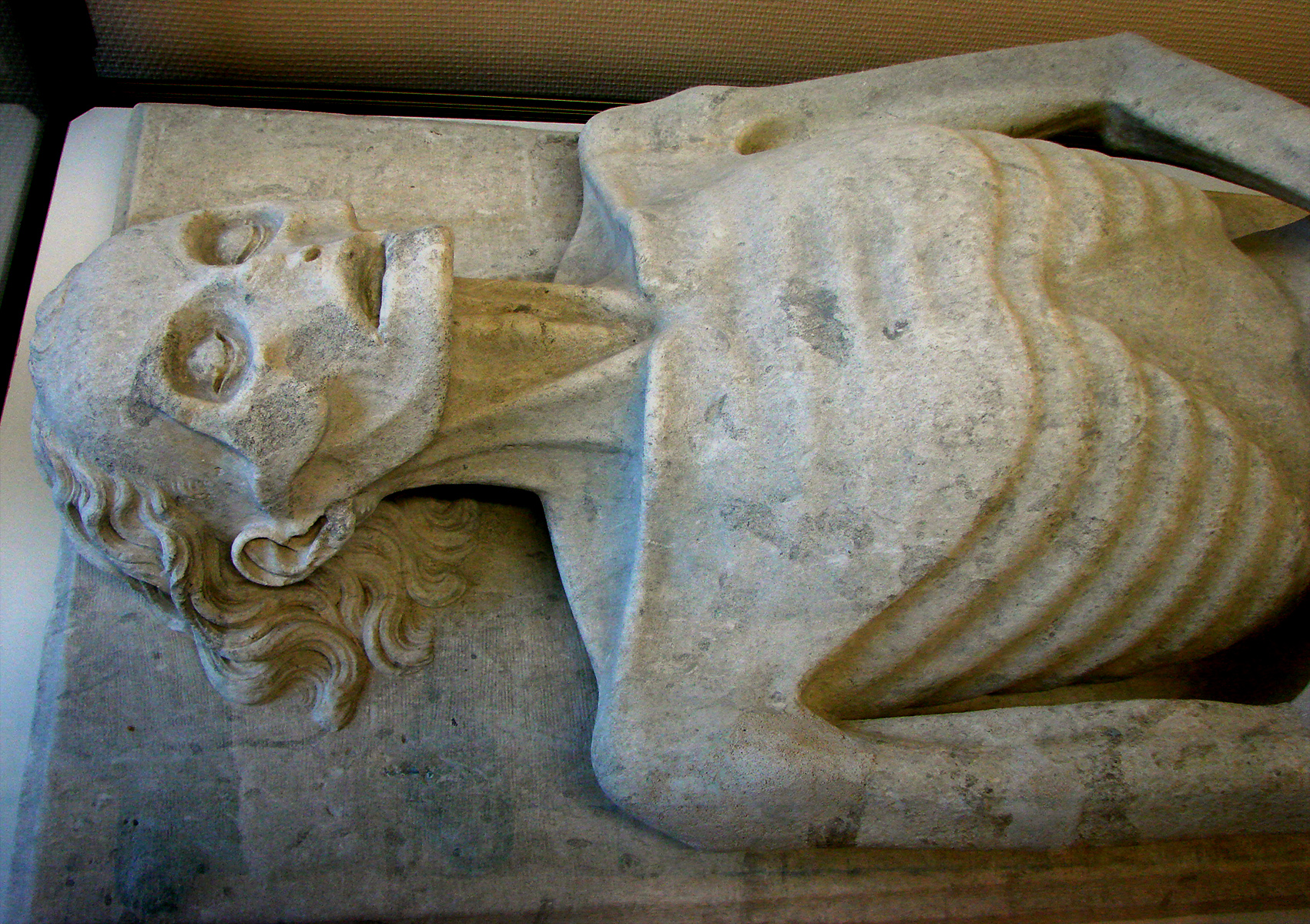
- Material: Limestone
- Size: Length: 184 cm (72 in)
- Created: 1394
- Present location: Musée d'art et d'archéologie de Laon, France

The Cadaver Tomb of Guillaume de Harsigny is a 1394 cadaver monument (transi) now in the Musée d'art et d'archéologie de Laon (Musée de Laon). It is notable as one of the earliest known French transi, and the first to be sculpted in the round (i.e. fully three dimensional as opposed to carved on coffin lid or stone slab). The original monument contained a tomb chest holding his remains, however this was lost in 1841. Similarly, the effigy had been painted black, this too is lost.

It was commissioned by Guillaume de Harsigny (c. 1300–1393), a French doctor who was one of the most notable physicians of his time. He became court physician to Charles V of France, and gained fame after an apparently successful operation on the King's skull after the monarch had suffered a nervous breakdown.

== Life and death of Guillaume de Harsigny ==
Harsigny studied medicine in Paris, where he also obtained his doctorate. He traveled across the Mediterranean, visiting centers of medical scholarship such as the Schola Medica Salernitana. Having expanded his knowledge, he returned to his homeland, Picardy, where, in the course of the plague epidemics of the Black Death, he gained a reputation as one of the best doctors in France. Thus, he became the personal physician of the powerful feudal lord Enguerrand VII de Coucy. During this time, he learned new medical techniques and compiled information from medical manuscripts.

When king Charles VI of France suffered a nervous breakdown (possibly a schizophrenic episode) in August 1392 near Le Mans, during a campaign against Brittany, unexpectedly attacked his own companions, killing some of them and falling into a coma himself, he was already abandoned by his doctors. It was only under the care of the aged Harsigny that the king recovered. This unexpected cure was the culmination of Harsigny's medical career

Harcigny died aged 93 in his home in Laon, France on July 10, 1393. Just before his death, Harsigny made a large donation to the church of the Cordeliers in Laon where he wished to be buried, and commissioned his transi tomb. He made instructions that his effigy would be a realistic and anatomically accurate portrayal of what his corpse looked like a year after his death.

== Description ==
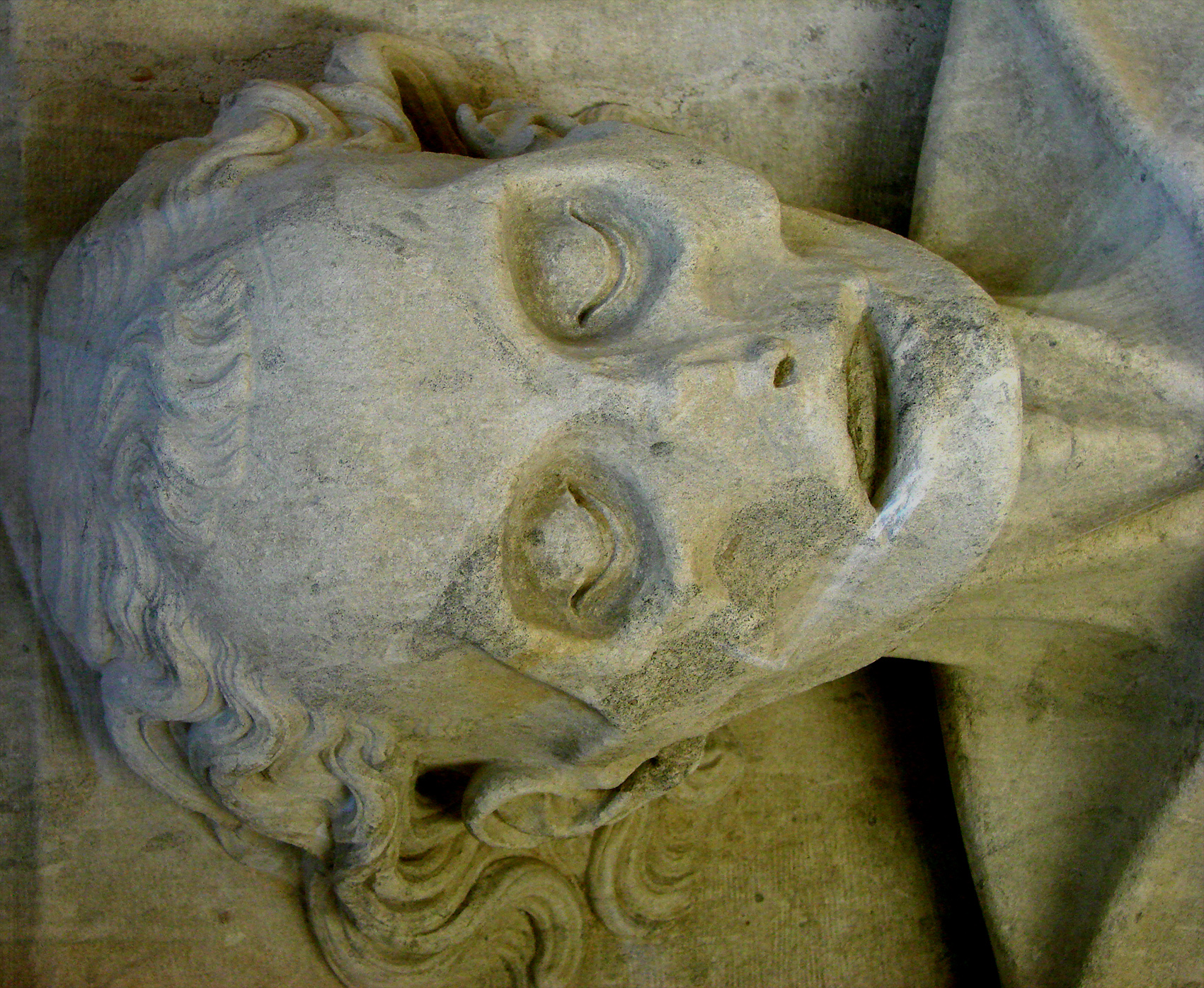
Detail of the skull

The effigy is carved from limestone and depicts him naked, gaunt and emaciated, with all the characteristics of old age and decomposition. His hair and skin are still intact, although the latter is tightly drawn across his skeleton. Some of his muscles are still in place. His hand are crossed over his genitals, preserving his modesty.

The effigy is inscribed with the words "Deo et Nature reddo simplicia (space) acta compositi sint Deo Grata", which roughly translates as "To God and nature I give back in simple form what was composite by the grace of God".

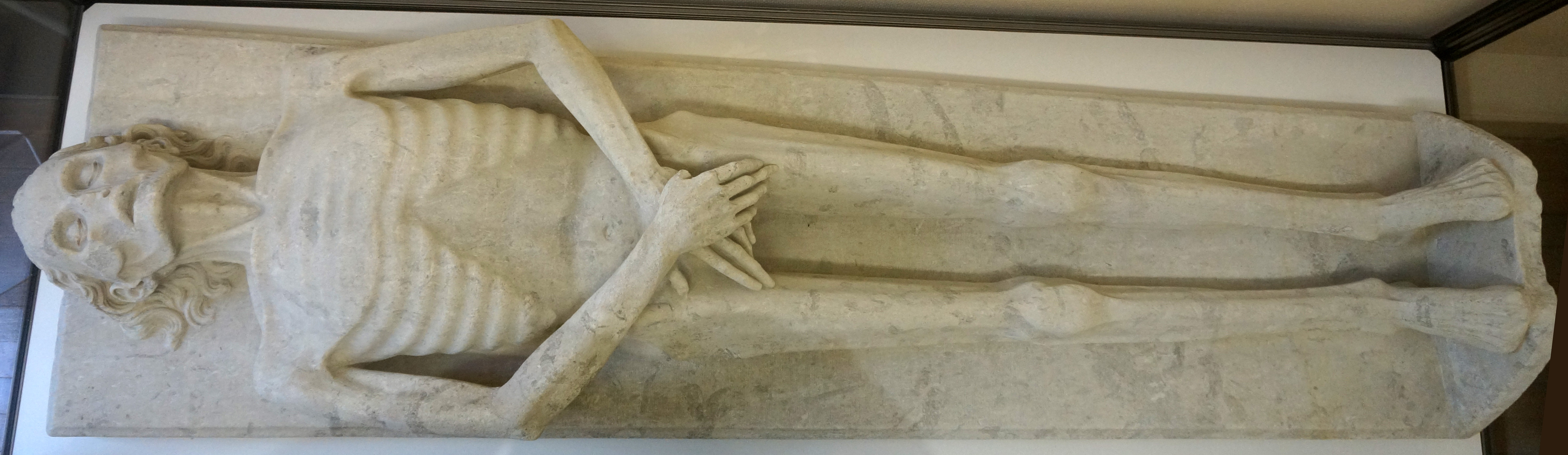
Full-length view

Harcigny's tomb is notable as the third earliest known French transi, and the first French example to be carved in three dimensions. Only the effigy survives from the original monument. It has been described as "remarkable for its realism and anatomical detail", and is life-sized at 184 cm (72 in) (6.0 feet).

== Condition ==
His monument was in the graveyard of the Cordeliers until the building was demolished during the French Revolution, after which his body and tomb were placed in the nave of Laon Cathedral. His body was exhumed in 1841, when the lead chest containing his remains was lost. The effigy has been in the chapel of the templars in the Musée de Laon since 1853.

It underwent restoration in 2003, when his broken right arm and missing parts of his footrest and toes were repaired or reinstated. Originally the stone would have been painted, probably a layer of black pigment, but this is now lost.

== Sources ==
- Cohen, Kathleen. Metamorphosis of a Death Symbol: The Transi Tomb in the Late Middle Ages and the Renaissance. Los Angeles: University of California Press, 1973. ISBN 978-0-5200-1844-0
- Glain, Stephen. (2005). Mullahs, Merchants, and Militants: The Economic Collapse of the Arab World. St. Martin's Griffin. ISBN 978-0-312-32912-9
- Heimerman, Emily. "A Portrait of Death: Analyzing the Transi Tomb of Guillaume de Harcigny (1300-1393 A.D.) Archived 2023-05-24 at the Wayback Machine". Coalition of Master's Scholars on Material Culture, April 2, 2021
- Panofsky, Erwin. Tomb Sculpture: Its Changing Aspects from Ancient Egypt to Bernini. London: Harry Abrams, 1964. ISBN 978-0-8109-3870-0
- Tuchman, Barbara. (1978). A Distant Mirror: The Calamitous 14th Century. New York: Ballantine. ISBN 978-0-345-34957-6
