= Smaragdus of Saint-Mihiel =

Smaragdus of Saint-Mihiel OSB (c. 770 – c. 840) was a Benedictine monk of Saint-Mihiel Abbey near Verdun. He was a significant writer of homilies and commentaries.

== Life ==
Of Visigothic heritage, Smaragdus was born in Spain around 770. He had moved to Francia by the first decade of the 9th century. Through a fellow immigrant Goth, Theodulf of Orléans, he was introduced to Charlemagne. After serving as principal of the convent school of the monastery on Castellion, he was elected abbot about 805. Around 814, he moved his monks a few miles away and founded the monastery of Saint-Mihiel on the banks of the river Meuse, in the diocese of Verdun.

Charlemagne employed him to write the letter to Pope Leo III, in which was communicated the decision of the Council of Aachen (809) respecting the adoption of the filioque clause, and sent him to Rome with the commissioners to lay the matter before the pope. He acted as secretary, and drew up the protocol. Louis the Pious showed him equal consideration, endowed his monastery, and in 824 appointed him to act with Frothar of Toul as arbitrator between Ismund, abbot of Moyenmoutier Abbey, and his monks. Smaragdus died about 840.

== Works ==
His writings show diligence and piety. His published works in prose are:

- Collections of Comments on the Epistle and Gospel for each holy day in the year, (Collectiones in epistolas et evangelia de tempore et de sanctis. Migne, CII. col 13-552. an uncritical but comprehensive compilation from numerous ecclesiastical writers, prepared for the use of preachers, and described by the author as a liber comitis.
- Diadema monachorum (The Crown of Monks), a collection in one hundred chapters of ascetic rules and reflections concerning the principal duties and virtues of the monastic life. It is for the most part a compilation. The sources are the Collectiones patrum of Cassian and the writings of Gregory the Great. Smaragdus made it after his elevation to the abbotship and enjoined its daily evening reading upon his monks (PL 102:693). It proved to be a very popular work, was widely circulated during the Middle Age, and was repeatedly published in the early modern period.
- Commentaria in regulam Sancti Benedicti. A commentary upon the Rule of St Benedict undertaken in aid of the monastic reforms instituted by the Council of Aachen. It is characterised by great strictness.
- The Royal way (Via regia, ibid. col 933–970) dedicated to Louis the Pious while king of Aquitania. So Ebert, l.c. p. III, it consists of thirty-two chapters of moral and spiritual counsels, which if faithfully followed will conduct an earthly king into the heavenly kingdom. The work is really only an adaptation of the Diadem to the wants of the secular life.
- Acts of the Roman conference (Acta collationis Romanae) Migne, CII. col. 971–976, the protocol already mentioned.
- Epistle of Charles the Great to Leo the Pope upon the procession of the Holy Spirit (Epistola Caroli Magni ad Leonem Papam de processione Spiritus Sancti), Migne, XCVIII. col. 923–929. the letter mentioned above.
- Epistle of Frotharius and Smaragdus to the Emperor Louis (Epistola Frotharii et Smaragdi ad Ludovicum Imperatorem), Migne, CVI. col, 865–866. the report of the arbitrators.
- Liberin partibus Donati. A larger grammar or a commentary upon Donatus (Grammatica major seu commentarius in Donatum). This is his earliest work, written at the request of his scholars, probably between 800 and 805. It is still unprinted, except a small portion in Mabillon, Vetera analectam, Nov. ed. (Paris, 1723) pp. 357, 358.
- Three Homilies on the Apocalypse. Published in English translation by Medieval Institute Publications under the title "Carolingian Commentaries on the Apocalypse by Theodulf and Smaragdus" in 2019 (TEAMS Commentary).

There remain in manuscript a Commentary on the Prophets, and a History of the Monastery of St. Michael (cf. Mabillon, l.c.) Smaragdus also wrote poetry. Besides a hymn to Christ (Ebert, l.c. p. 112) there have been preserved his metrical introductions to his Collections and Commentary on the rule of St. Benedict, of which the first has twenty-nine lines in hexameter, and the second thirty-seven distichs.
