= Cadaver Tomb of René of Chalon =

Life sized funerary statue and memento mori

Coordinates: 48°46′05″N 5°09′34″E

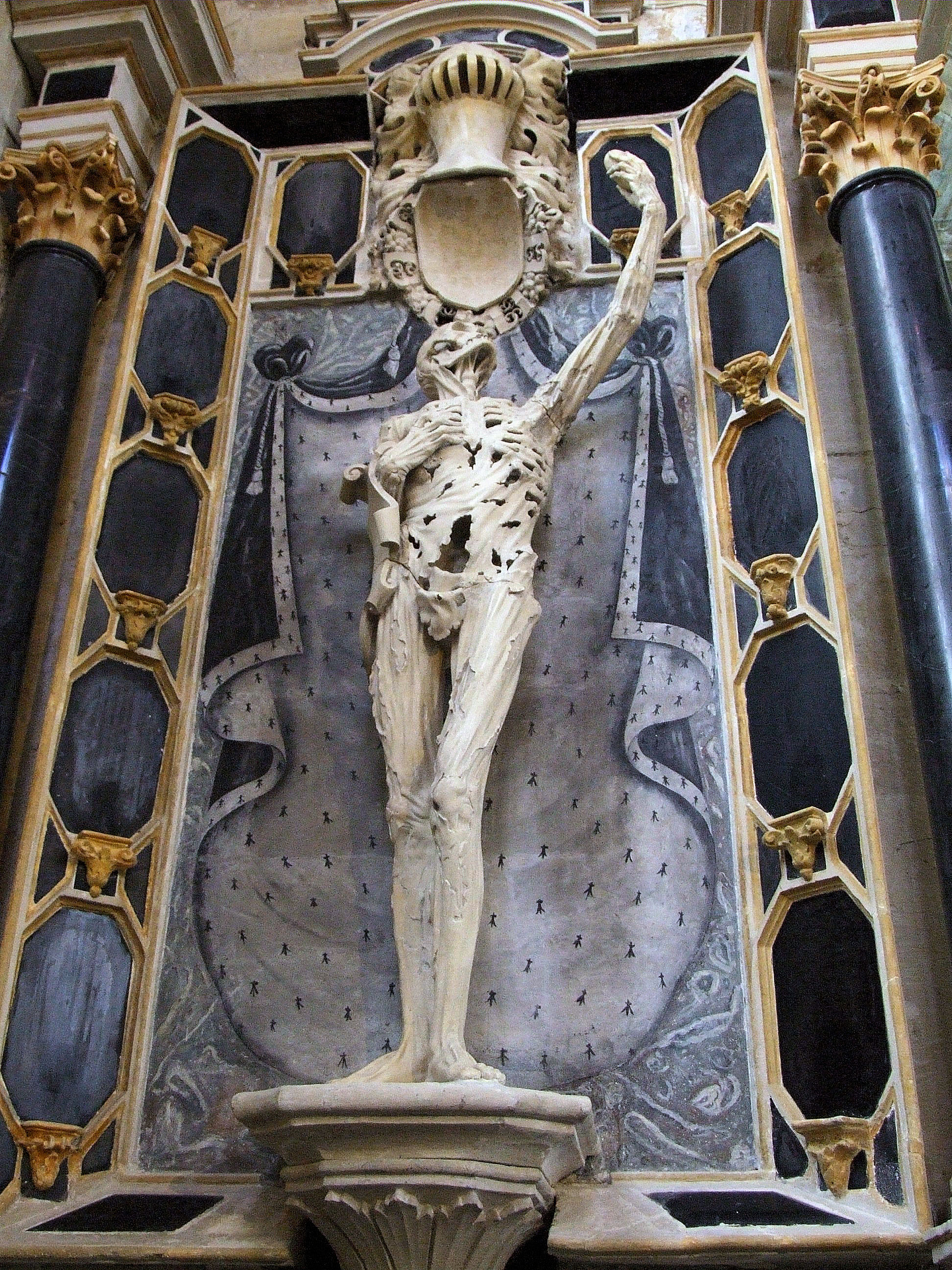
Ligier Richier, upper section of the Transi de René de Chalon, c. 1545–47

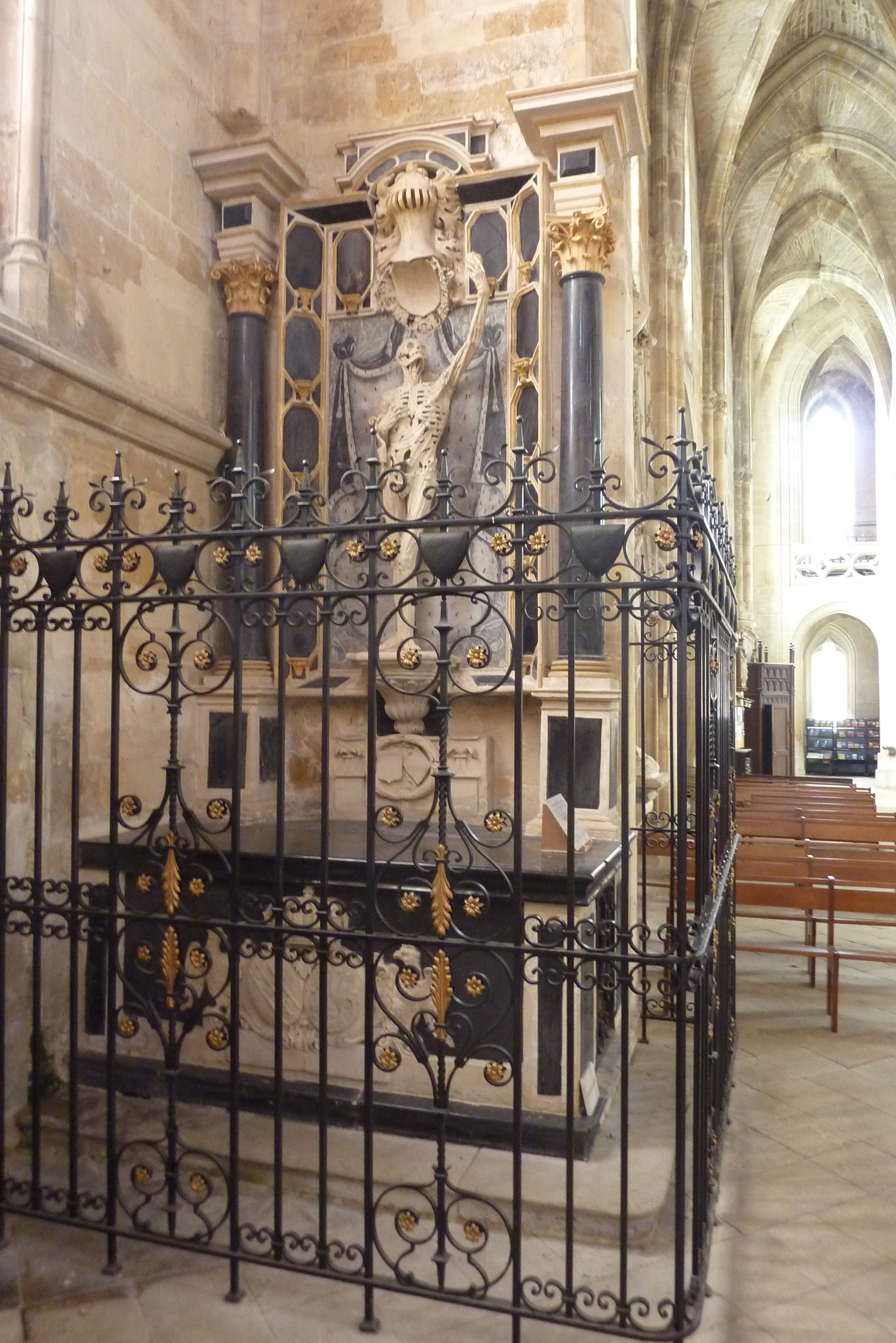
Full view with black marble columns and altarpiece

The Cadaver Tomb of René of Chalon (French: Transi de René de Chalon, also known as the Memorial to the Heart of René de Chalon or The Skeleton) is a late Gothic period cadaver monument (transi) in the church of Saint-Étienne at Bar-le-Duc, in northeastern France. It consists of an altarpiece and a limestone statue of a putrefied and skinless corpse which stands upright and extends his left hand outwards. Completed sometime between 1544 and 1557, the majority of its construction is attributed to the French sculptor Ligier Richier. Other elements, including the coat of arms and funerary drapery, were added in the 16th and 18th centuries respectively.

The tomb dates from a period of societal anxiety over death, as plague, war and religious conflicts ravaged Europe. It was commissioned as the resting place of René of Chalon, Prince of Orange, son-in-law of Duke Antoine of Lorraine. René died at the age of 25 during the siege of St. Dizier on 15 July 1544, from a wound sustained in battle the previous day. Richier presents him as an écorché, with his skin and muscles decayed, leaving him reduced to a skeleton. This fulfilled his alleged deathbed wish, that his tomb depict his body as it would be three years after his death. His left arm is raised as if gesturing towards heaven. At one point, his heart was supposedly held in a reliquary, placed in the hand of the figure's raised arm. Unusually for contemporaneous objects of this type, his skeleton is standing, making it a "living corpse", an innovation that was to become highly influential. The tomb effigy is positioned above the carved marble and limestone altarpiece.

Designated a Monument historique on 18 June 1898, the tomb was moved for safekeeping to the Panthéon in Paris during the First World War, before being returned to Bar-le-Duc in 1920. Both the statue and altarpiece underwent extensive restoration between 1998 and 2003. Replicas of the statue are in the Musée Barrois in Bar-le-Duc, the Palais de Chaillot in Paris, and the Palais des Beaux-Arts in Lille.

== Description ==
=== Statue ===
The statue is 177 centimetres (70 in) in height, and made from black marble and limestone. It consists of three limestone blocks which form the skeleton's head and torso, left arm, and legs and pelvis. Both the statue and its frame are supported by an iron stud located at the figure's pelvis. The corpse is life-sized, putrefied and emaciated, and hangs above the church altarpiece. Its left arm reaches out, while its right hand rests on its chest. The outstretched arm may have once have held René's preserved heart, and extended in a gesture that may have been either pleading or tribute to a higher being.

The rotting skeleton is depicted in an unflinching realistic manner, and placed on a stylobate supported on two black marble columns with Corinthian capitals. A coat of arms is placed underneath the figure, while the escutcheon is empty. The figure has been described as a "rotting corpse with shredded muscles falling from the bones and skin hanging in flaps over a hollow carcass".

His left hand reaches upwards as if pleading to heaven or God. The gesture may be in reference to the biblical passage from Job 19:26: "And though after my skin, worms destroy my body, yet in my flesh shall I see God". The gesture may represent contrite pleading or supplication, or the ability of the spirit to overcome mortality. The art historian Kathleen Cohen writes that the monument may be an illustration of the "doctrine of corruption as a necessary step toward regeneration".

René's outstretched hand was stolen by a French soldier in 1793. It was later replaced, but shown holding either a clepsydra or hourglass, obvious symbolic objects for a memento mori. However, that placement changed the meaning of the sculpture, from a representation of René to a depiction of the personification of death or as a danse macabre.

== Death of René of Chalon ==
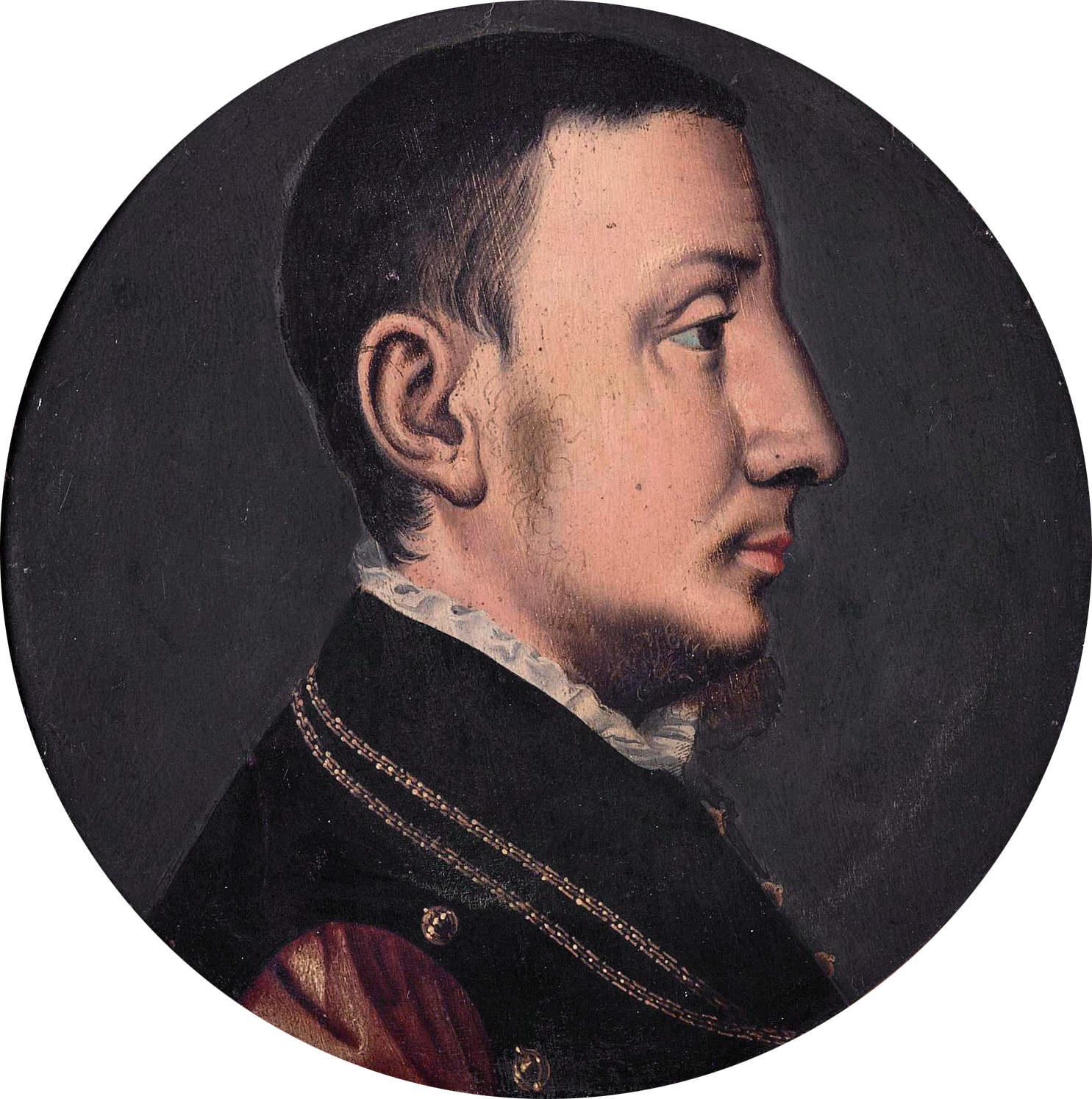
Jan van Scorel, René of Chalon, 1542

René of Chalon, Prince of Orange and stadtholder of Holland, Zeeland, Utrecht and Gelre, died on 15 July 1544, aged 25, during the siege of St. Dizier where he fought for Emperor Charles V. René had been mortally wounded in battle the previous day, and died with the Emperor in attendance at his bedside. He died without leaving any direct descendants. Charles wrote soon after to René's wife, Anna of Lorraine (d. 1568), setting out in detail the circumstances of René's last hours and death. The monument apparently fulfills his wish that he be represented above this tomb as an écorché, that is a body without skin, and "as he would be three years after his death". Cadaver monuments had been built for other members of the family, including his father Henry III of Nassau-Breda, his uncle Philibert of Chalon, his grandmother, and the uncle of his wife. René requested that his tomb present him "not as a standard figure but a life-size skeleton with strips of dried skin flapping over a hollow carcass, whose right hand clutches at the empty rib cage while the left hand holds high his heart in a grand gesture".

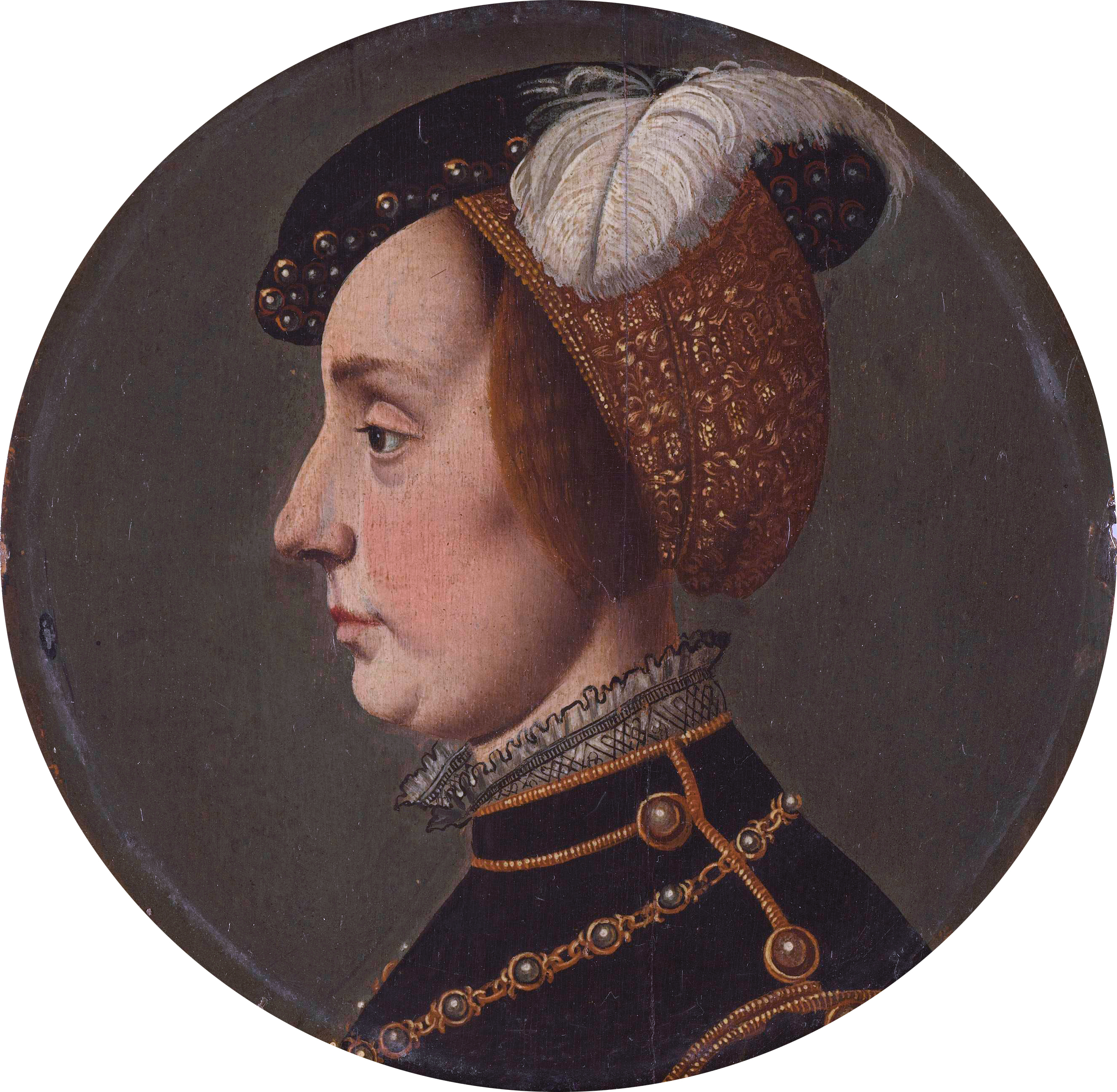
Jan van Scorel, Portrait of Anna of Lorraine, 1542

René's intention has never been definitively attributed, and there is no mention of it in either Charles' letter or René's will. Given this lack of record and that, at only 25 years, René was unlikely to have previously thought closely about his own burial and memorial, it seems most likely that the idea behind the design came from Anna. She is known to have commissioned the piece from Ligier Richier, who was then little known outside his local area of Saint-Mihiel in north-eastern France, but is today considered one of the most important sculptors of the late Gothic period. Although the precise dating is uncertain, it is known to have begun after 1544 and was completed before 1557. The tomb has become his most well known and influential work.

In accordance with funeral rites of the time, René's heart, bowels, and bones were separated. His heart and bowels were kept at Bar-le-Duc and placed in the Collegiate Church of St. Maxe, which was demolished during the French Revolution and abandoned in 1782, while the rest were transferred to Breda to be interred with his father and his daughter, who died in early infancy. His widow commissioned Richier to construct a transi to hold some of the remains of her husband. The monument, along with other remains and relics of members of his family, were reinterred at the church of Saint-Étienne in June 1790.

Anna commissioned the tomb as a memento mori, but the level of detail she may have specified is uncertain. It is perhaps Richier's best-known work, remarkable for its original presentation of a "living corpse", a motif unparalleled in earlier funerary art. He produced one more work in a similar vein, his Death, now in the Musée des Beaux-Arts de Dijon. Both works are comparable in form and intent to the 1520s La Mort Saint-Innocent originally from the Holy Innocents' Cemetery in Paris, now in the Musee du Louvre. In that work, a realistically depicted and severely emaciated corpse raises his right hand upwards while holding a shield in his left hand.

=== Altarpiece and frame ===
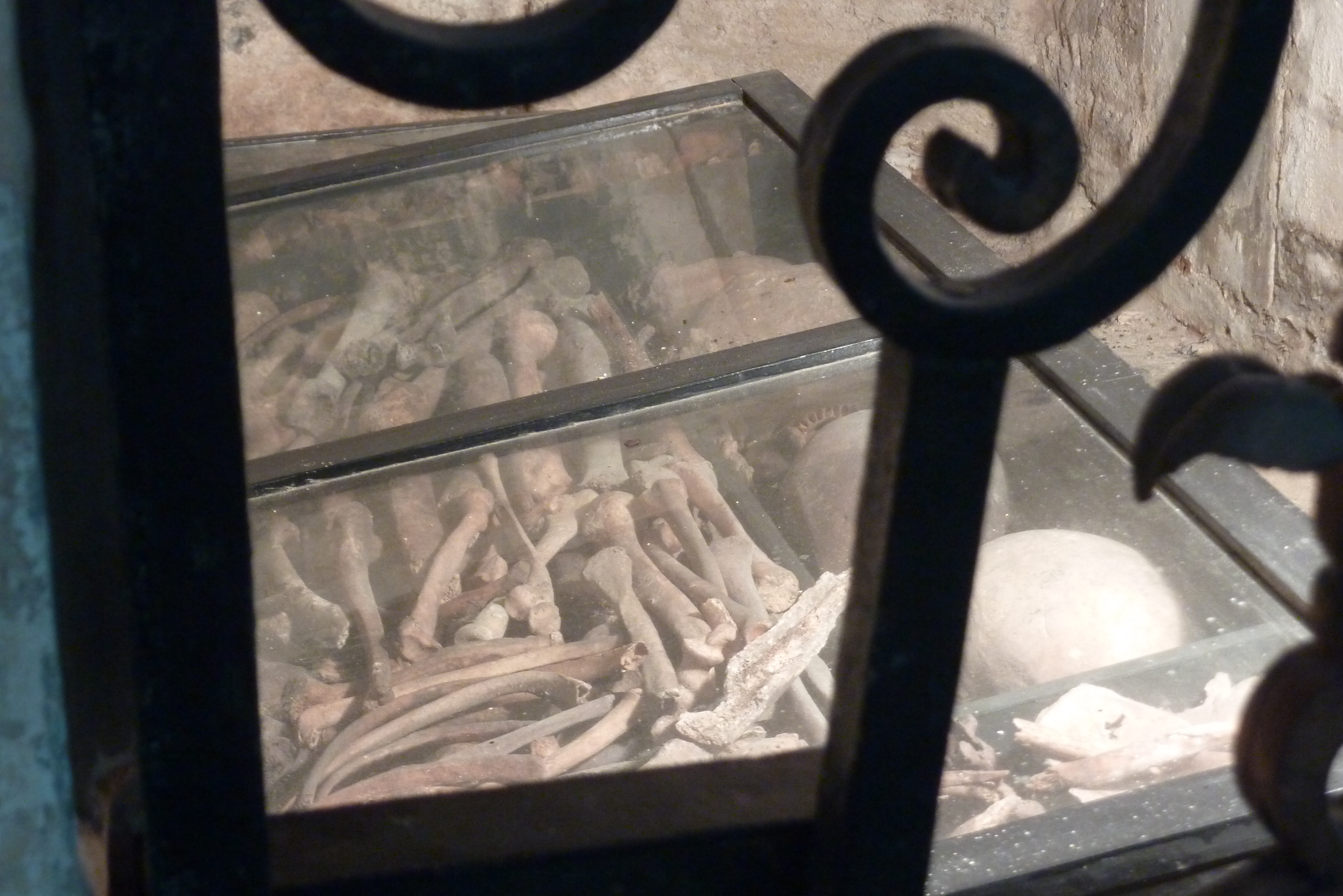
Interment of nobles of the Duchy of Bar at the tomb

The altarpiece is made from black carved marble and limestone and measures 267 cm × 592 cm (105 in × 233 in). Its top-slab is taken from the former tomb of Henry IV, Count of Bar (d. 1344) and Yolande of Flanders (d. 1395). The black slab contains two series of inscriptions which are also later additions. The coat of arms of Bar and Lorraine were added to the front face in 1810 at the request of the then vicar of Saint-Étienne, Claude Rollet. The funeral drapery is also a later addition.

The altar holds a glass-covered reliquary for the bones of other royals and nobles of the Duchy of Bar, and includes the remains of Henry IV and his wife Yolande, Robert, Duke of Bar (d. 1411) and his wife Marie of France (d. 1404), as well as those of their son, Edward III, Duke of Bar (d. 1415). Other possible burials include Frederick I, Duke of Upper Lorraine, Edward I, Count of Bar (d. 1336) and Mary of Burgundy (b. 1298). The mural on the wall behind the statue was painted by Varembel Barber in 1790.

The frame consists of black marble octagonal panels set in white stone, between which were twelve small corbel statuettes measuring between 38 and 40 cm (1.25–1.3 ft) in height. None remain today; six are known to have been destroyed in November 1793 during the French Revolution. The escutcheon above the statue is missing its emblem.

== Interpretation ==
Cadaver monuments, in France known as transis, were intended to show the human body's "transition" from life to decomposition. Art historians debate this particular example's meaning, specifically the symbolism of the raised hand and what it originally held. At one time, the raised hand is supposed to have contained the prince's actual dried heart.

The effigy is viewed by art historians in two distinct ways. The more literal interpretation is that the tomb is a dedication commissioned by a loving and pious wife. Other scholars, including Bernard Noël and Paulette Choné, read deeper meaning, and invoking a sense of the "spirituality of death", view the work as a comment on both the inevitability and effect of death. These opposing interpretations were juxtaposed in 1922 by the novelist Louis Bertrand when he wrote that the tomb may represent either despair or a romantic ideal of the eternal spirit. A further interpretation is that the work represents a mark of penance or repentance of past sins.

== Legacy ==
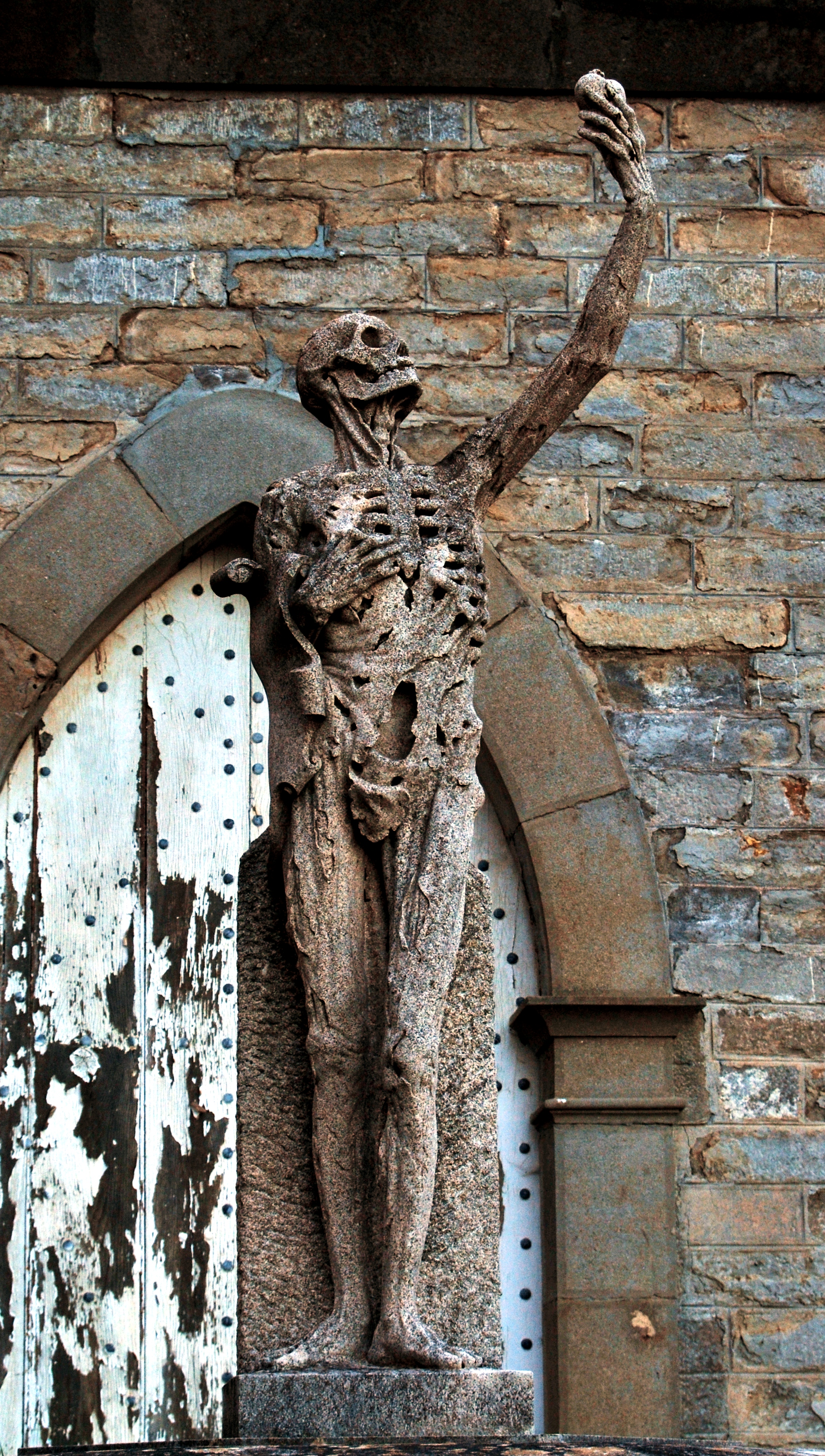
François Pompon, Statue at the Tomb of Henry Bataille in Moux, 1922

A copy of the cadaver for the Palais de Chaillot was produced in 1894. François Pompon made a further copy in 1922 for the tomb of the playwright and poet Henry Bataille at Moux, while another replica is in the Musée Barrois in Bar-le-Duc. Death, an unattributed 16th-century sculpture realistically depicting a corpse wrapped in a shroud, now in the Musée des Beaux-Arts de Dijon (catalog number 743), is very similar, but much smaller.

The first literary reference to the transi appears in Louis Des Masures' 1557 Epitaph on the Heart of René de Chalon, Prince of Orange, and a photograph of the statue appears on the cover of the 1992 Faber edition of the book. The French poet Louis Aragon evoked the tomb in "Le Crève-cœur", published in 1941. It inspired the titular poem in Thom Gunn's 1992 collection The Man with Night Sweats; elegies written in the aftermath of the deaths of friends from AIDS. The poems includes the lines "My flesh was its own shield:/Where it was gashed, it healed. / Stopped upright where I am / Hugging my body to me / As if to shield it from / The pains that will go through me". Simone de Beauvoir details her first encounter with the tomb in her 1974 autobiography All Said and Done, describing it as a "masterpiece" of a "living man...already mummified".

The tomb was designated as a Monument historique on 18 June 1898.

== Provenance and conservation ==
The tomb was originally placed in the collegiate church of Saint-Maxe in Bar-le-Duc, where it was positioned over a vault which may have held the hearts of René, his father-in-law Antoine, Duke of Lorraine, and other members of his family. It was moved to the church of St Ėtienne in 1782 when the former site was abandoned. It was moved to the Panthéon in Paris during the First World War and was returned to Bar-le-Duc in 1920.

Due to humidity and contact with water, the tomb has suffered damage over the centuries. It was restored in 1969 by Maxime Chiquet d'Allancancelles. Both the statue and altarpiece underwent further restoration between 1998 and 2003. In 1993 both the retable and the tomb were classified as historic monuments, and underwent restoration. An extensive assessment and historical study commissioned by the Direction régionale des affaires culturelles in 1998 was followed by a condition assessment and recommendations in 2001.

The 2003 restoration was conducted in stages, beginning with the dismantling of the statue which was painstakingly cleaned with cotton buds, before the altar was dismantled to clean its back wall. Microcrystalline cellulose wax was used to polish both the back wall and side columns. The restorer Françoise Joseph cleaned the mural, brightening the colours, and during the process discovered decorations at each of its four corners. Because the church's basement is often water-logged in winter, the mural had been damaged by humidity. Repairs to the statue included the removal of wrinkles, splinters, cracks, and graffiti; much of the work centered on areas around the groin, knee and pelvis. The iron fasteners were removed and replaced with stainless steel studs, removing the future risk of oxidation.

== Sources ==
- Beaujeu, Claude-Marie. Lalexandrin dans "Le Crève-Coeur dAragon: étude de rythme (in French). Paris: Presses de lUniversité de Paris-Sorbonne, 1993. ISBN 978-2-8405-0012-4.
- Chastel, André. French Art: The Renaissance, 1430–1620. Paris: Flammarion, 1995. ISBN 978-2-0801-3583-4.
- Chirat, Didier. Les petites histoires de l'Histoire de France (in French). Paris: Larousse, 2018. ASIN B07KXTRW97.
- Cohen, Kathleen. Metamorphosis of a Death Symbol: The Transi Tomb in the Late Middle Ages and the Renaissance. Berkeley and Los Angeles: University of California Press, 1973. ISBN 978-0-5200-1844-0.
- Cohen, Kathleen. The Changing Meaning of the Transi Tomb in Fifteenth and Sixteenth-Century Europe. Berkeley and Los Angeles: University of California Press, 1968.
- Denis, Paul. "Ligier Richier L'Artiste et Son Oeuvre". Nancy and Paris: Berger-Levrault, 1911.
- Gedo, Mary. Psychoanalytic Perspectives on Art, Volume 3. Abingdon-on-Thames: Routledge, 1998. ISBN 978-0-8816-3078-7.
- Gillis, Colin. "Rethinking Sexuality in Thom Gunn's 'The Man with Night Sweats'". Contemporary Literature, volume 50, No. 1, 2009. pp. 156–82 JSTOR 20616416.
- Hoffman, Tyler. "Representing AIDS: Thom Gunn and the Modalities of Verse". South Atlantic Review, volume 65, no. 2, 2000, pp. 13–39 JSTOR 3201810.
- Jones, David Annwn. Gothic effigy: A Guide to Dark Visibilities. Manchester: Manchester University Press, 2018. ISBN 978-1-5261-0122-8 .
- Kuyper, W. The Triumphant Entry of Renaissance Architecture Into the Netherlands. Alphen aan den Rijn: Canaletto, 2004. ISBN 978-9-0646-9693-0.
- Manca, Joseph; Bade, Patrick; Costello, Sarah; Charles, Victoria. 30 Millennia of Sculpture. New York: Parkstone International, 2016. ASIN B0769QD14W .
- Noël, Bernard; Choné, Paulette. Ligier Richier. Thionville Conseil général de la Meuse, 2000. ISBN 978-2-9126-4520-3.
- Quarré, Pierre. "Sculptures acquired by the Dijon Museum from 1940 to 1946". Bulletin des Musées de France, November 1946.
- Rowen, Herbert. The Princes of Orange: the Stadholders in the Dutch Republic. Cambridge: Cambridge University Press, 1988. ISBN 978-0-5213-9653-0 .
- Thuillier, Jacques. History of Art. Paris: Flammarion, 2003. ISBN 978-2-0801-0875-3.
