= Léopold Durand =

French architect (1666–1749)

Léopold Durand OSB (29 November 1666 – 5 November 1749) was a French architect.

== Life ==
Durand was born in Saint-Mihiel, Lorraine, on 29 November 1666. He studied law and architecture, after which he went to become a member of the Order of Saint Benedict in 1702.

Durand died on 5 November 1749.
