= Saint-Mihiel =

- Commune
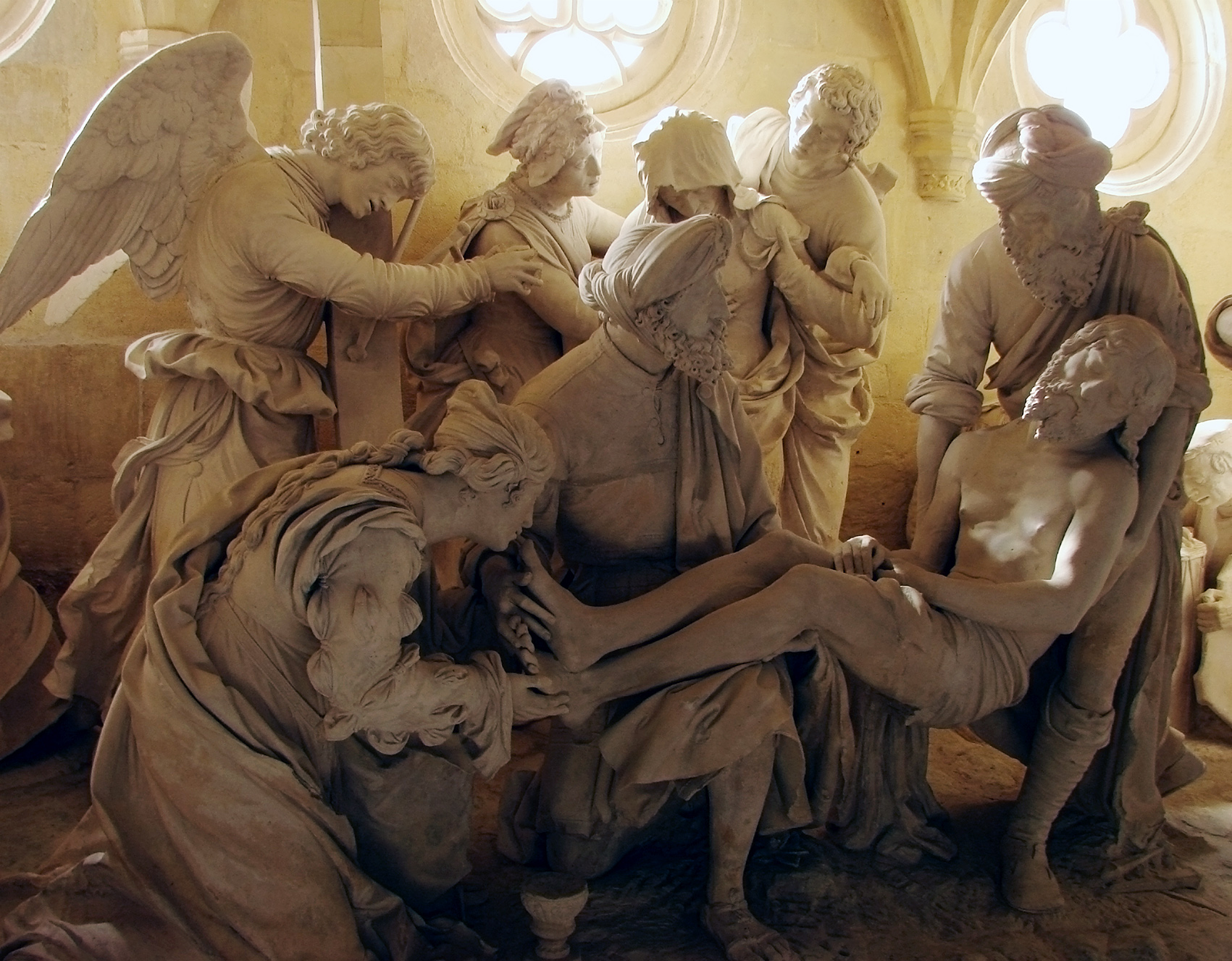
- Entombment of Christ, sculpture by Ligier Richier (16th century), in the Church of St Étienne, in Saint-Mihiel

- Coat of arms
- Location of Saint-Mihiel
- Location within France Location within Grand Est
- Coordinates: 48°53′21″N 5°32′37″E
- Country: France
- Region: Grand Est
- Department: Meuse
- Arrondissement: Commercy
- Canton: Saint-Mihiel
- Intercommunality: Sammiellois

Government
  - Mayor (2020–2026): Xavier Cochet
- Area^{1}: 33 km^{2} (13 sq mi)
- Elevation: 228 m (748 ft)
- Population (2023): 3,772
  - Density: 110/km^{2} (300/sq mi)
- Time zone: UTC+01:00 (CET)
  - Summer (DST): UTC+02:00 (CEST)
- INSEE/Postal code: 55463 /55300
- ^{1} French Land Register data, which excludes lakes, ponds, glaciers > 1 km^{2} (0.386 sq mi or 247 acres) and river estuaries.

Saint-Mihiel (French pronunciation: [sɛ̃ mijɛl]) is a commune in the Meuse department in the Grand Est region in Northeastern France.

== Geography ==
Saint-Mihiel lies on the banks of the river Meuse.

== History ==
Saint-Mihiel Abbey, a Benedictine abbey, was established here in 708 or 709 by Count Wulfoalde and his wife Adalsinde. The 11th-17th century abbey church and most of the 18th century abbey buildings have been preserved. The library, containing over 9,000 works, is still on the original site.

During World War I, Saint-Mihiel was captured by the Germans in 1914, and was recaptured during the Battle of Saint-Mihiel by the American Expeditionary Forces (AEF) from 12 September to 19 September 1918.

== Demographics ==
Historical population
Year	Pop.	±% p.a.
1968	5,295	—
1975	5,572	+0.73%
1982	5,525	−0.12%
1990	5,367	−0.36%
1999	5,260	−0.22%
2007	4,816	−1.10%
2012	4,339	−2.06%
2017	4,112	−1.07%
2023	3,772	−1.43%
Source: INSEE

== Features ==
Saint-Mihiel is known for its sculptures by Renaissance sculptor Ligier Richier (1500–1567).

Saint-Mihiel serves both as the starting and ending point of the 2014 video game Valiant Hearts: The Great War.

== See also ==
- Communes of the Meuse department
- Léopold Durand
- Sculptures by Ligier Richier
- List of World War I memorials and cemeteries in the area of the St Mihiel salient
