= Ligier Richier =

French sculptor

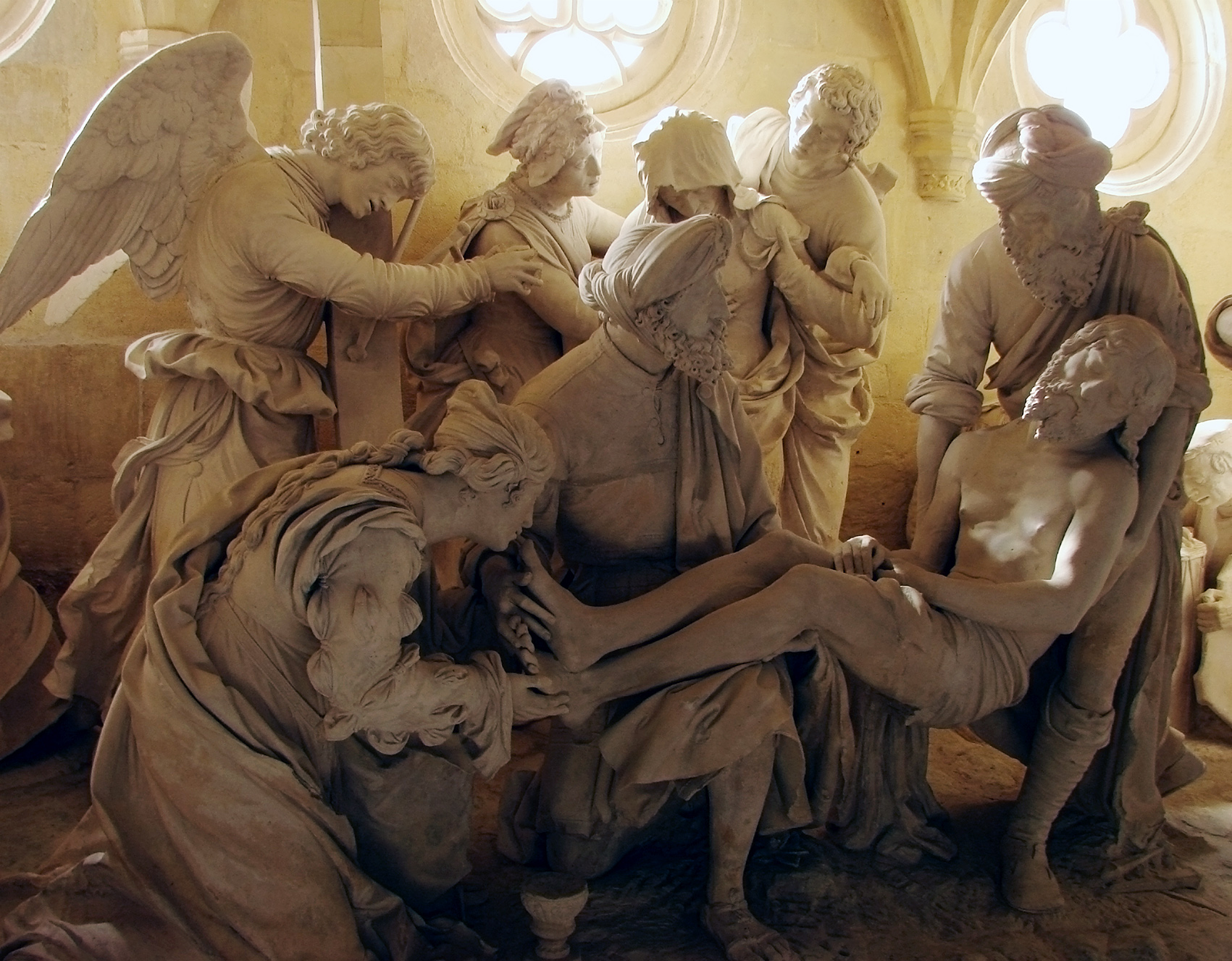
Ligier Richier, Lamentation of Christ, Church of St. Étienne, Saint-Mihiel, France

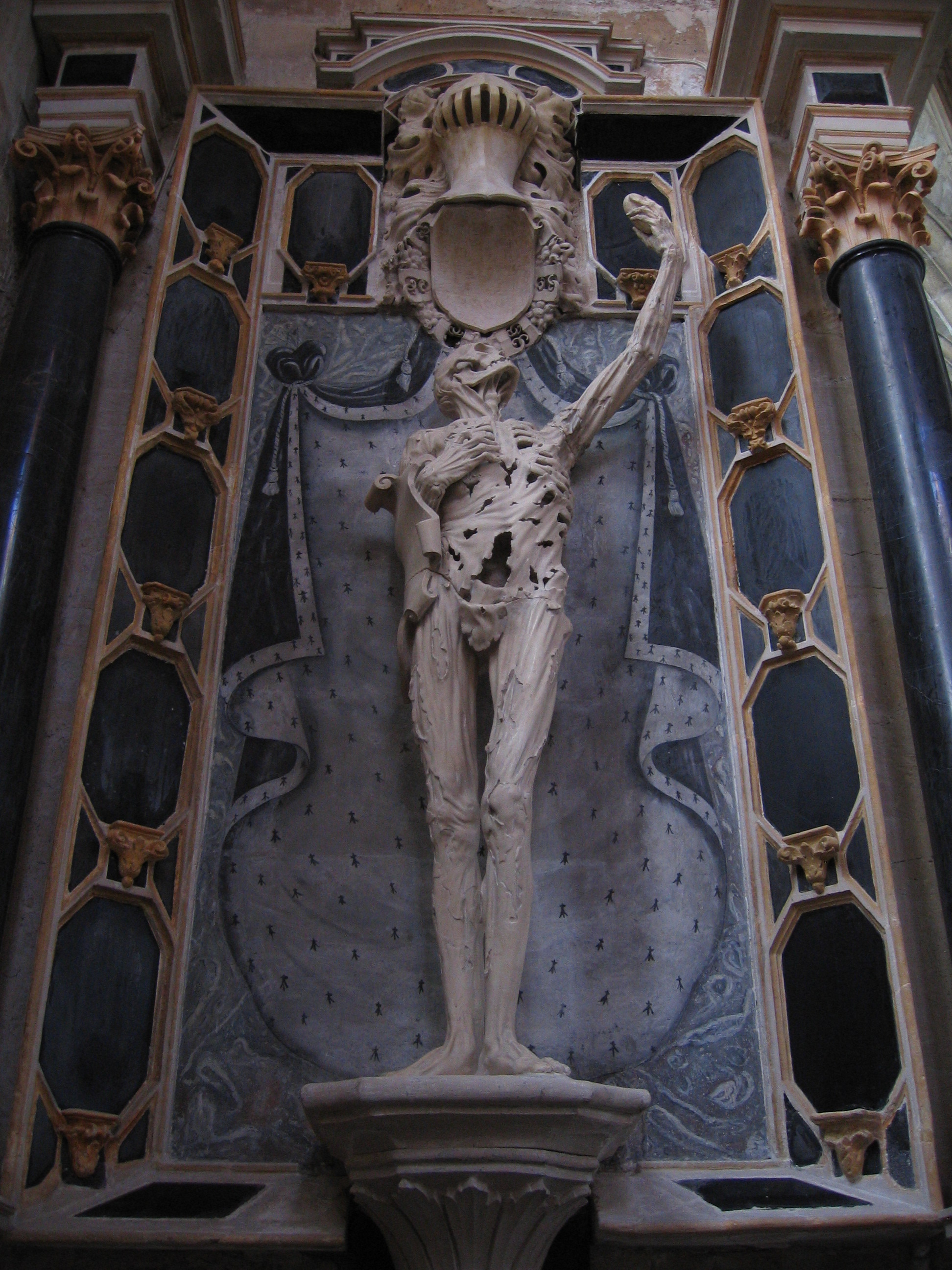
Le Transi de René de Chalon, Church of St. Étienne, Bar-le-Duc, France.

Ligier Richier (French pronunciation: [liʒje ʁiʃje]; c. 1500—1567) was a French sculptor active in Saint-Mihiel in Northeastern France.

Richier primarily worked in the churches of his native Saint-Mihiel. Starting in 1530, he enjoyed the patronage of Antoine, Duke of Lorraine, who commissioned his work. Whilst Richier did sometimes work in wood, he preferred the pale, soft limestone with its fine grain, and few veins, extracted at Saint Mihiel and Sorcy and when working in this medium he experimented with refined polishing techniques, with which he was able to give the stone a marble-like appearance. One of his finest works is the "Groupe de la Passion", consisting of 13 life-size figures made in the local stone of the Meuse region. It can be found in the Church of St. Étienne. It is also known as the "Pâmoison de la Vierge" (Swoon of the Virgin, the Virgin fainting, supported by St John). Other works attributed to him are in the Church of St. Pierre, Bar-le-Duc, and in the Louvre.

His work "Le Transi de René de Chalon" is in the church of Saint-Étienne in Bar-le-Duc. Made in Sorcy stone and standing at 1m74cm, it depicts the corpse of René of Châlon, Prince of Orange (who died on the 15th of July 1544) in the form of a flayed corpse clutching its own heart.

== Career ==
Whilst little is known of Ligier Richier's personal life, it is recorded that in 1560, with the others living in Saint-Mihiel, he petitioned the Duke of Lorraine in order to practice in the reformed Protestant religion. He was apparently unsuccessful, for in 1564 he joined his daughter Bernadine in Geneva, Switzerland. She had married Pierre Godart, another Protestant who left Lorraine because of his religious beliefs. Richier remained in Geneva until his death in 1567.

Perhaps more than any other French artist of his period, Ligier Richier produced some notable works linked to the "Passion"; a mixture of calvaries, pietàs and "mise au tombeau" (a depiction of the entombment). Some researchers believe he was born in Dragonville near Commercy, but there is evidence that he was born in Saint-Mihiel The people of Saint-Mihiel and its immediate neighbourhood are known as "Sammiellois". It is not clear when Richier was born.

Richier executed calvaries for the parish church in Briey and for Saint-Étienne's church in Bar-le-Duc, the famous "mise au tombeau" for the Saint-Mihiel church of Saint-Étienne, a pietà for a church in Étain, and a depiction of the Virgin Mary fainting for Saint-Michel's church in Saint-Mihiel and was responsible for other works in neighbouring villages and towns in Lorraine. He also executed some funerary statues including the statue on the tomb of René de Chalon, the Prince of Orange, killed in 1544 at the Siege of Saint-Dizier, located in the church of Saint-Étienne in Bar-le-Duc, this a macabre exercise in "écorché". He also produced a sculpture for the tomb of Philippa de Gueldres, the widow of Duke René II of Lorraine in Pont-à-Mousson where she died in 1547.

From 1530 onwards Richier worked under the protection of Duke Antoine of Lorraine, for whom he did commissions. Although he also worked in wood, he preferred the soft limestone available from quarries around Saint-Mihiel and Sorcy and by developing new polishing techniques he was able to give the limestone a marble-like appearance.

== See also ==
- Sculptures by Ligier Richier
