= Renaissance sculpture =

Sculpture during the Renaissance period

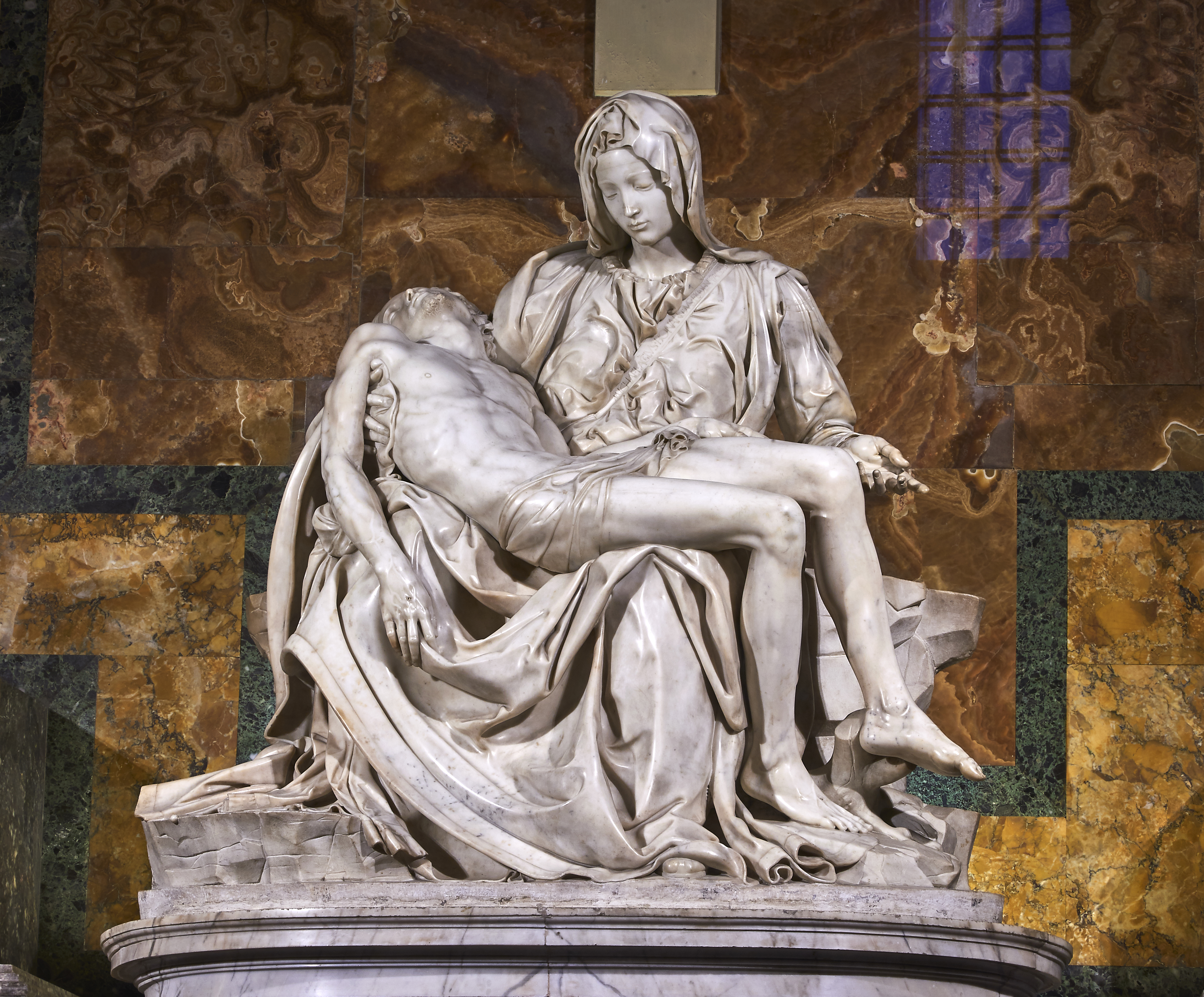
Vatican Pietà, a Renaissance work by Michelangelo Buonarroti.

Renaissance sculpture is understood as a process of recovery of the sculpture of classical antiquity. Sculptors found in the artistic remains and in the discoveries of sites of that bygone era, the perfect inspiration for their works. They were also inspired by nature. The Flemish artists in northern Europe, in addition to overcoming the figurative style of the Gothic, promoted a Renaissance distinct from the Italian one.

The rebirth of antiquity with the abandonment of the medieval, which for Giorgio Vasari "had been a world of Goths", and the recognition of the classics with all their variants and nuances was a phenomenon that developed almost exclusively in Italian Renaissance sculpture. Renaissance art succeeded in interpreting Nature and, with freedom and knowledge, translating it into a multitude of masterpieces.

== Characteristics ==
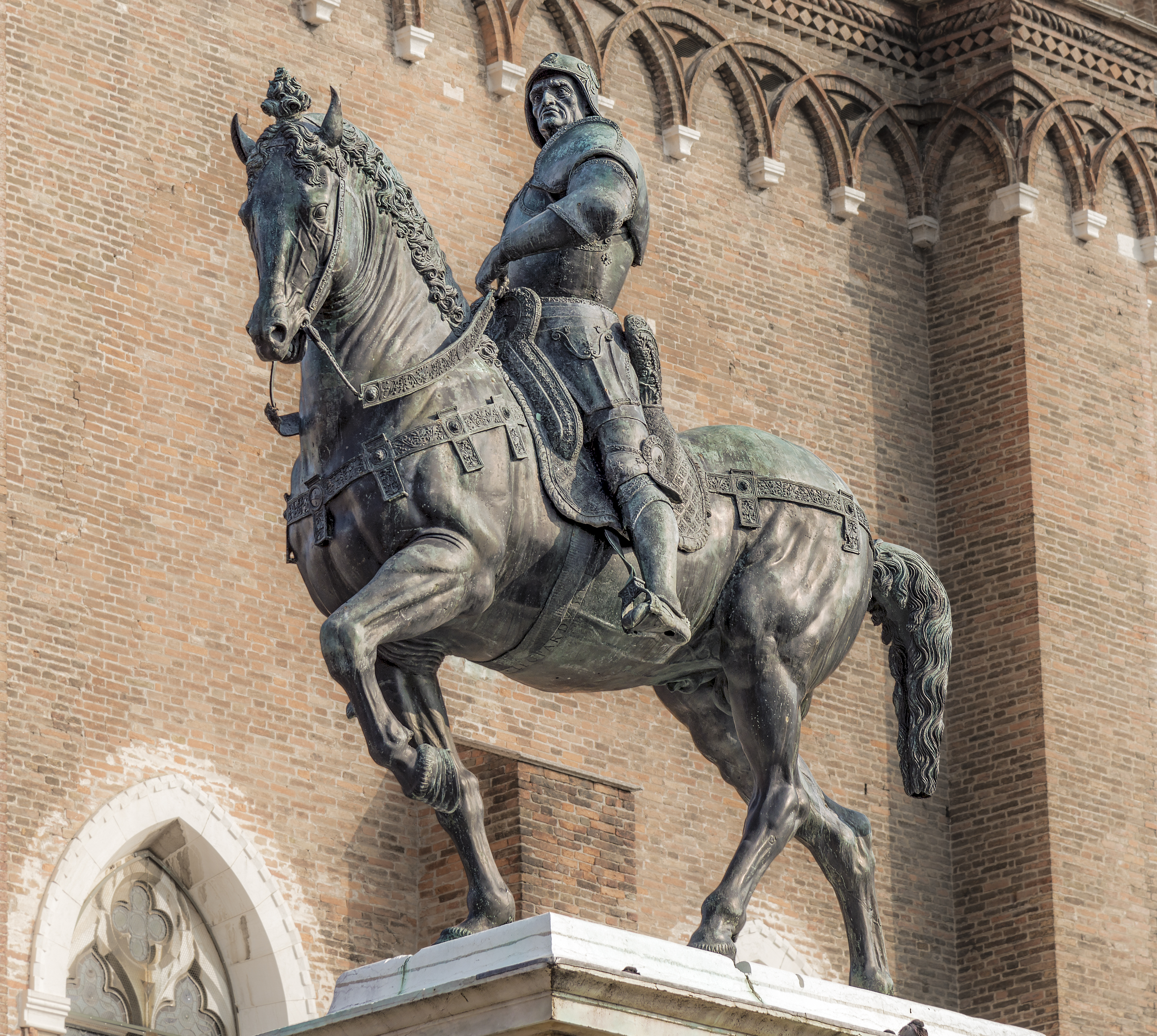
Equestrian statue of Bartolomeo Colleoni in bronze, Verrocchio.

Renaissance sculpture took as its basis and model the works of classical antiquity and its mythology, with a new vision of humanist thought and the function of sculpture. As in Greek sculpture, the naturalistic representation of the human body was seen as the highest subject, and aligned with the contemporary study of human anatomy. In Italy, profane and religious themes coexisted; this was not the case in other countries such as Spain and Germany, where religious themes prevailed.

The human body represented absolute Beauty, whose mathematical correspondence between the parts was well defined, and the contrapposto was used from Donatello to Michelangelo. It was at this time that sculpture was practically freed from the architectural framework, the reliefs were made with the rules of perspective and the characters were shown with dramatic expressions that led to the sensation of great terribilità in the feelings expressed in Michelangelo's sculptures, as in the face of his David.

A fundamental role was played by the figure of the Maecenas, represented by the church and noblemen who, with their patronage, obtained social prestige and political propaganda, and covered all themes: religious, mythological, daily life, portraits of characters, etc.

With the Renaissance, the Greco-Roman glyptics reappeared, which had been almost completely forgotten during the Middle Ages in fine stone carving (except for a few examples of Byzantine art), and from the 16th century, precious cameos of classical taste were carved, so perfect that sometimes they could be confused with the ancient ones. However, the use of fine stone carvings, so favoured by the Greek and Roman civilisations, was hardly restored. These small reliefs served as a model, once enlarged, for decoration by sculptors in large medallions for palaces in Italy and France.

=== Materials ===
Renaissance sculpture made use of a wide range of materials, mainly marble, bronze and wood. Reproductions of bronze statuettes were widespread in the Renaissance due to the large number of collectors. In Florence, Antonio Pollaiuolo (Hercules and Antaeus) and Andrea del Verrocchio (Winged Boy with Fish) were the initiators, commissioned by the Medici. From the workshop of Leonardo da Vinci, small bronzes with the rearing horse of a height of 23 cm are preserved. The Mantuan sculptor Pier Jacopo Alari Bonacolsi, called Antico, settled in Rome to execute bronze reductions of ancient marbles.

Wood was used in countries such as Germany and Spain, where the great forest wealth and the traditional polychrome woodwork were deeply rooted; it was used in the execution of religious imagery, altarpieces, and altars.

Terracotta was used as a more economical material, in natural colour and polychrome, as used by Antonio Rossellino and his disciple Matteo Civitali in the Virgin of the Annunciation in the church of the Servants of Lucca. The Italian artist Pietro Torrigiano made in Spain several sculptures in polychrome clay, some of them are preserved in the Museum of Fine Arts of Seville. Luca della Robbia, who followed the Donatello style, is credited with the invention of enameled clay, which he used in the tabernacle of Santa Maria Novella in Florence in combination with marble to give color to the work, and later in tondos and Madonnas; his workshop, followed by his nephew Andrea della Robbia, produced a large number of works in enameled terracotta that spread throughout Europe. This has reached different parts of the world as it is a manifestation of feelings and history.

=== Techniques ===
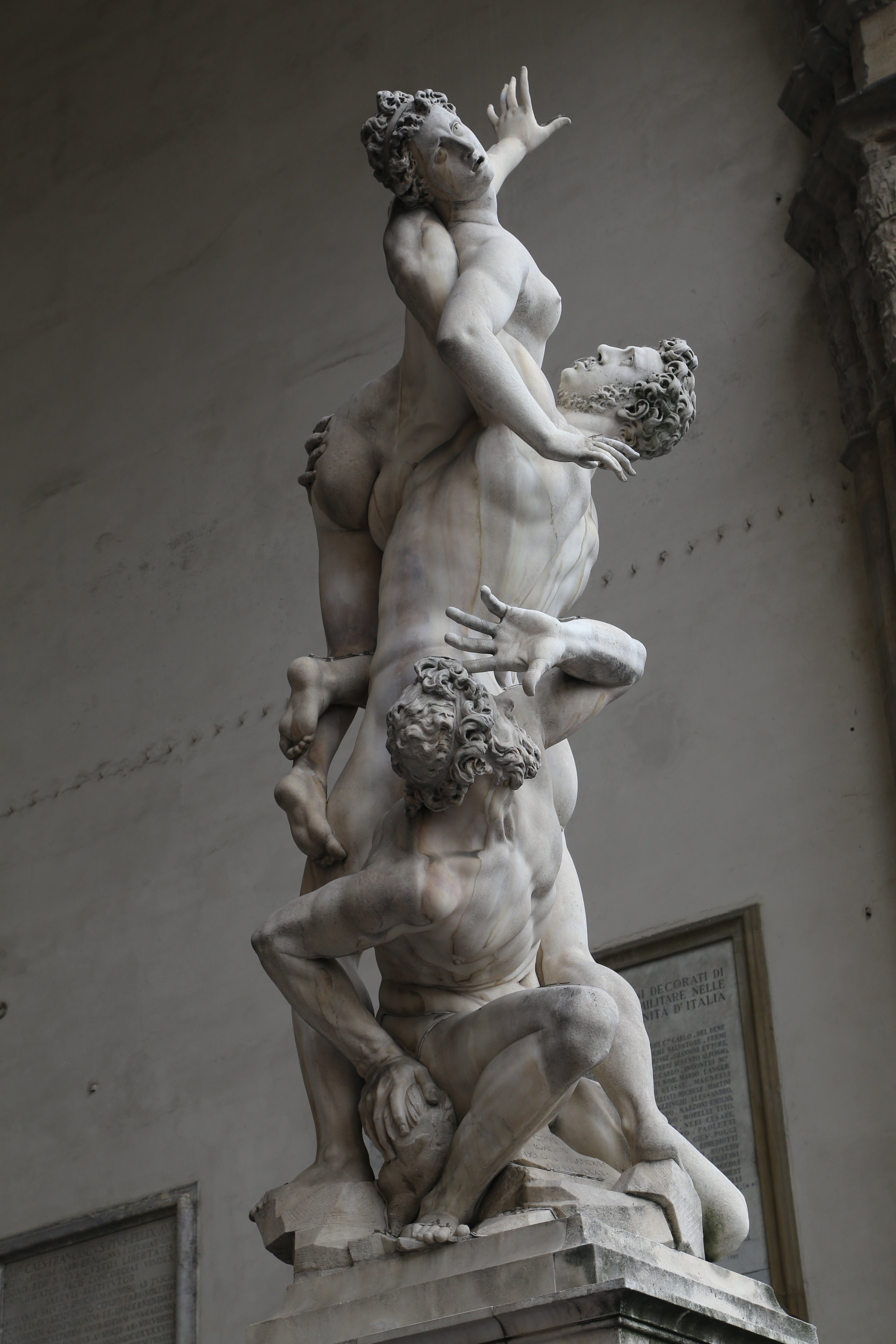
Abduction of a Sabine Woman, by the Flemish sculptor Giambologna, where the composition is shown in a spiral movement.

The technique of marble carving was revived during the Renaissance, with the perfection it had reached in the classical period. From the Renaissance onwards, the hand drill, or trepan, was used to remove stone to a certain depth. This tool was used whether the sculpture was made in direct carving, as Michelangelo had sometimes done, or whether the past of points from a model made in plaster was used, as was usually done by artists such as Giambologna, whose marked points can be seen in many of his sculptures. Donatello used the Greek method of working the block in the round, but Michelangelo carved it from one side. This is how Benvenuto Cellini described it:

The best method ever employed by Michelangelo; after having drawn the main perspective on the block, he began to tear off the marble from one side as if he intended to work a relief and thus, step by step, to bring out the complete figure.

— Benvenuto Cellini, on Miguel Angel, escultor.

For bronze works, the work had to be previously made in clay or wax for its subsequent casting; it was then chiselled to eliminate possible casting defects, the surface was polished with abrasives, and patinas were added to the sculptor's taste.

Wood carving was mainly used in Northern Europe and Spain and could also be done by direct carving on the wood block, with a small sketch for guidance, or with a previous model in plaster or clay, and also by passing it through points, as in marble.

=== Composition ===
- Sculpture in the round

The Renaissance adopted the basic elements that had been described by Vitruvius, who held:

... that the proportion of the human form was to serve as a paradigm for the proportions of man's creations. Since nature has designed the human body in such a way that its members are properly proportioned to the figure as a whole, it seems that the ancients had good reason for their rule, which says that in perfect buildings the different members must bear exact symmetrical relations to the general scheme as a whole.

— Vitruvius (1st century), on D'Architectura

The use of the human figure sought was rooted in the search for perfection in anatomy, about which many artists of this period acquired real knowledge through the practice of dissection. The first Renaissance free-standing sculpture that showed the harmony of the nude was Donatello's David during the Quattrocento, in which the influence of Praxiteles' style could be appreciated with a slight contrapposto to achieve balance in the composition. In the following years, knowledge of human anatomy was acquiring great perfection, until it reached a full contrapposto. The expressions on faces stopped being hieratic and began to reveal inner feelings; the so-called Renaissance terribilità (Michelangelo's David, around 1504). In the sculptural groups of religious character, the combination of naturalism with an intense expressiveness was shown, the Florentine serenity disappeared before the passions shown by the characters with their faces deformed by gestures of despair and pain, visible in the Burials of Christ by Guido Mazzoni and Niccolò dell'Arca. Sculpture evolved in its conception and in the compositions of its groups, until it reached the serpentinata typical of Mannerism, which is clearly shown in works such as the Florentine Pietà (Michelangelo) or the Rape of the Sabine Women (Giambologna).

- Relief sculpture

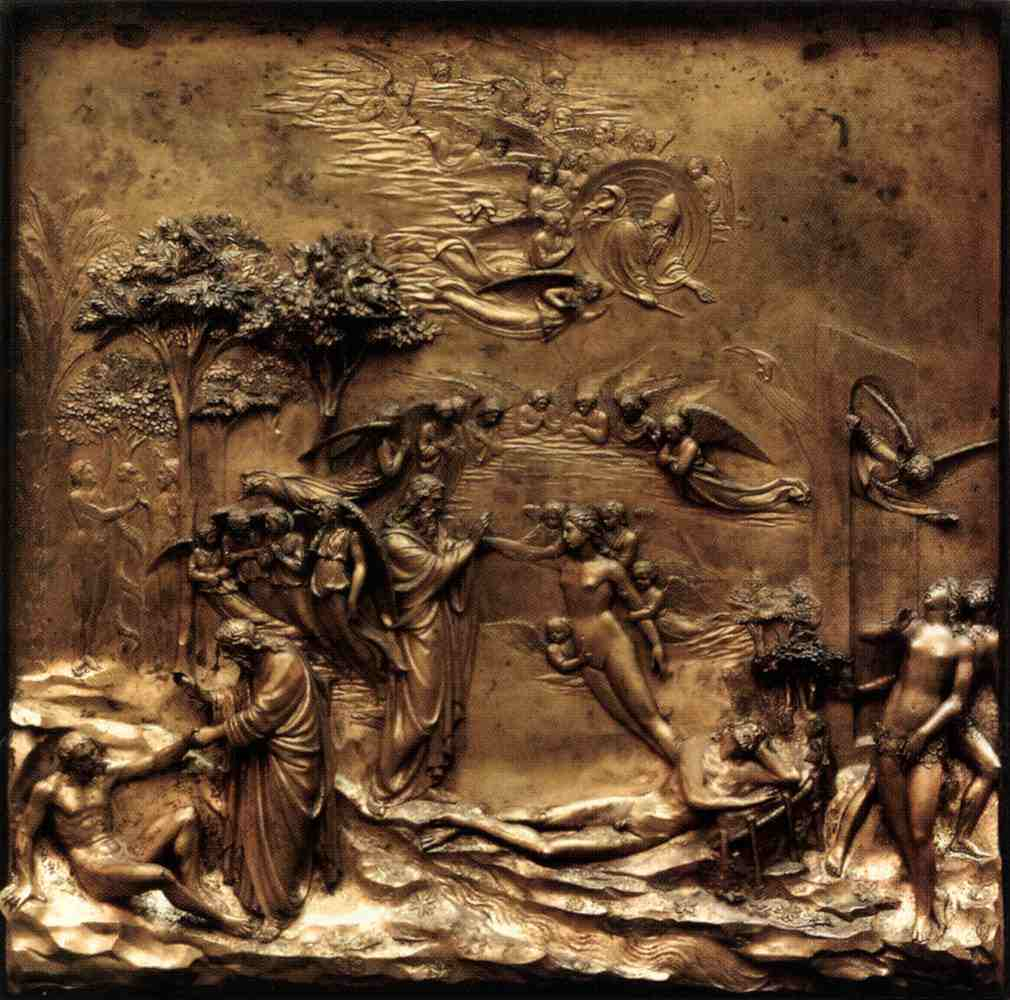
Relief of "Adam and Eve" by Ghiberti.

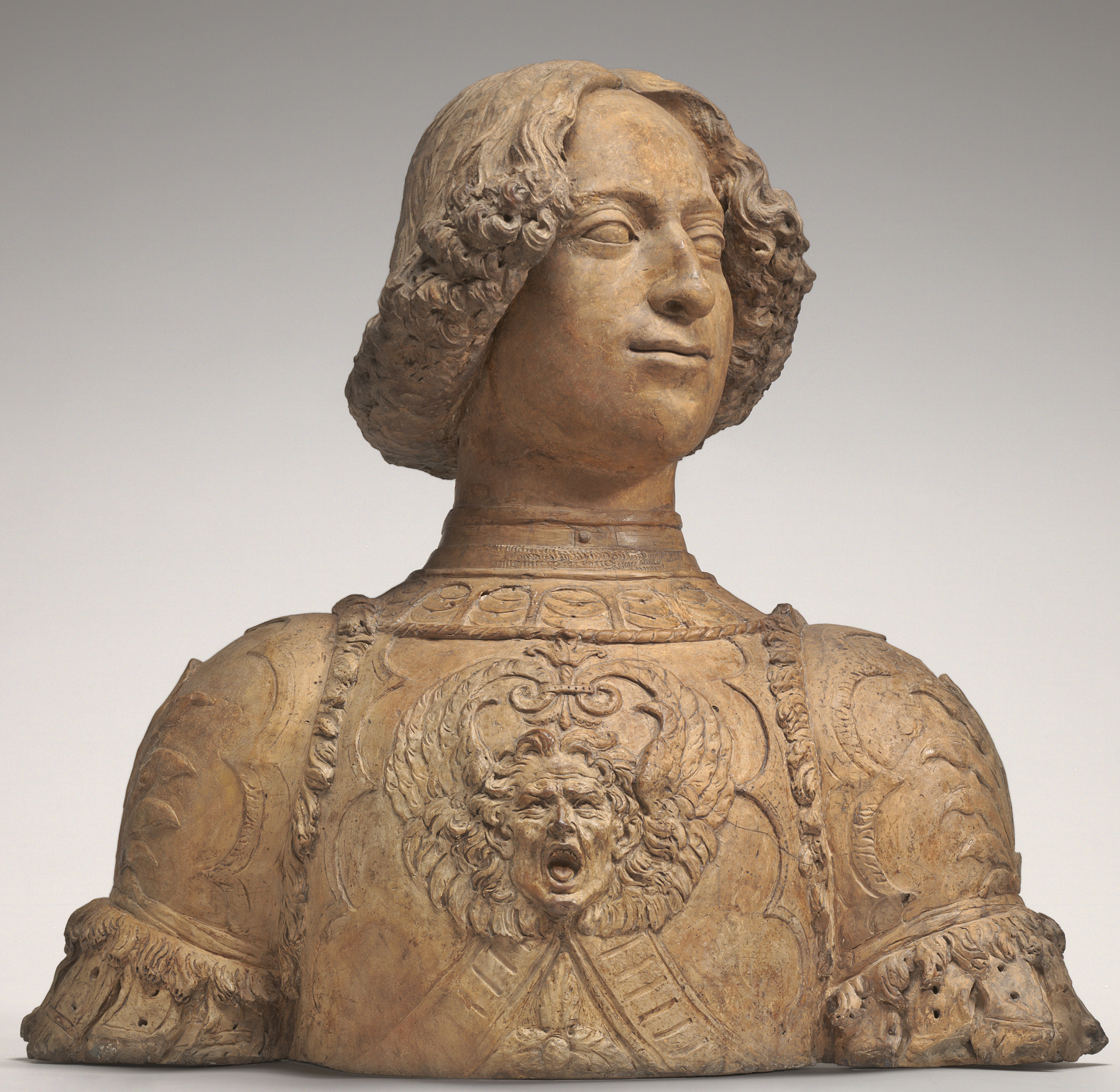
Bust-portrait of Giuliano de' Medici by Verrocchio (1475–1478).

In relief, architecture and the newly acquired laws of perspective were used to compose the backgrounds of the representations, as in the famous Gates of Paradise by Ghiberti or in the reliefs with the stiacciato technique for the altar of St. Anthony in Padua by Donatello. Architectural structures were composed as a backdrop, just as Giotto had done in his Proto-Renaissance paintings. Some Italian bronze laudas were transported to Spain, such as the one in the cathedral of Badajoz by Lorenzo Suárez de Figueroa.

Flemish sculpture, together with that of the Germanic countries, developed a realism that was appreciated in all the ornamental details, where the sculptural work was presented almost as a work of goldsmithing applied to the great wooden altars. Also in Spain, the Gothic-Flemish influence together with the Italian influence was reflected in reliefs, such as the one on one of the doors of the cathedral of Barcelona made by the Flemish sculptor Michael Lochner and by Bartolomé Ordóñez in Italian style in the backchorus of the same cathedral. The reliefs around the sarcophagi usually represented scenes from the life of the deceased: their life, miracles and martyrdom if they were religious, or battles and military deeds if they were nobility figures. The funerary monuments were developing different phases of composition, from the traditional structure of the funerary slab or the statue of the solitary recumbent in his sarcophagus used in medieval times, to the tombs attached framed by architectural elements in the manner of a triumphal arch, and with a result similar to an altarpiece, where in the central street was the urn usually with the figure of the recumbent on it and allegorical figures in the side streets. Finally, they were made with the representation of the deceased in a praying attitude, typical of Spain and France.

During the Renaissance, the Plateresque style originated in Spain, which represented a change in the way buildings were decorated with sculptural elements in a mainly Italian style, not only in the stone of the facades but also in wood and plaster in the interiors of the buildings, based on historiated reliefs and vegetal ornaments typical of the early Renaissance (called "in candelieri") with large heraldic escutcheon and putti around them.

- Bust

Bust portraits continued to be used in the Quattrocento, with the new humanistic conception that emphasised representation with great physical resemblance, while also affirming the sitter's personality. According to Alberti, the artist had to "characterize but also establish harmonious relationships". They were made in bronze, polychrome terracotta and marble (Donatello, Verrocchio, Francesco Laurana).

- Equestrian statue

The life-size equestrian statue in bronze had already been treated by Roman sculptors such as the Marcus Aurelius then located in St. John Lateran; also the bronze horses of St. Mark's in Venice served as a model for the Italian Renaissance, and can be considered inspirational for Donatello's Gattamelata and Verrocchio's Colleoni. Leonardo da Vinci's studies led to a change in the representation of the horse, which was placed on its hind legs and in an attitude of pouncing on the enemy; the idea was probably taken from reliefs of ancient sarcophagi.

== Italian Sculpture ==
The historiography divides this period between the 15th and 16th centuries, in two stages that take the name of Quattrocento and Cinquecento.

=== The Quattrocento Florentine sculptors ===
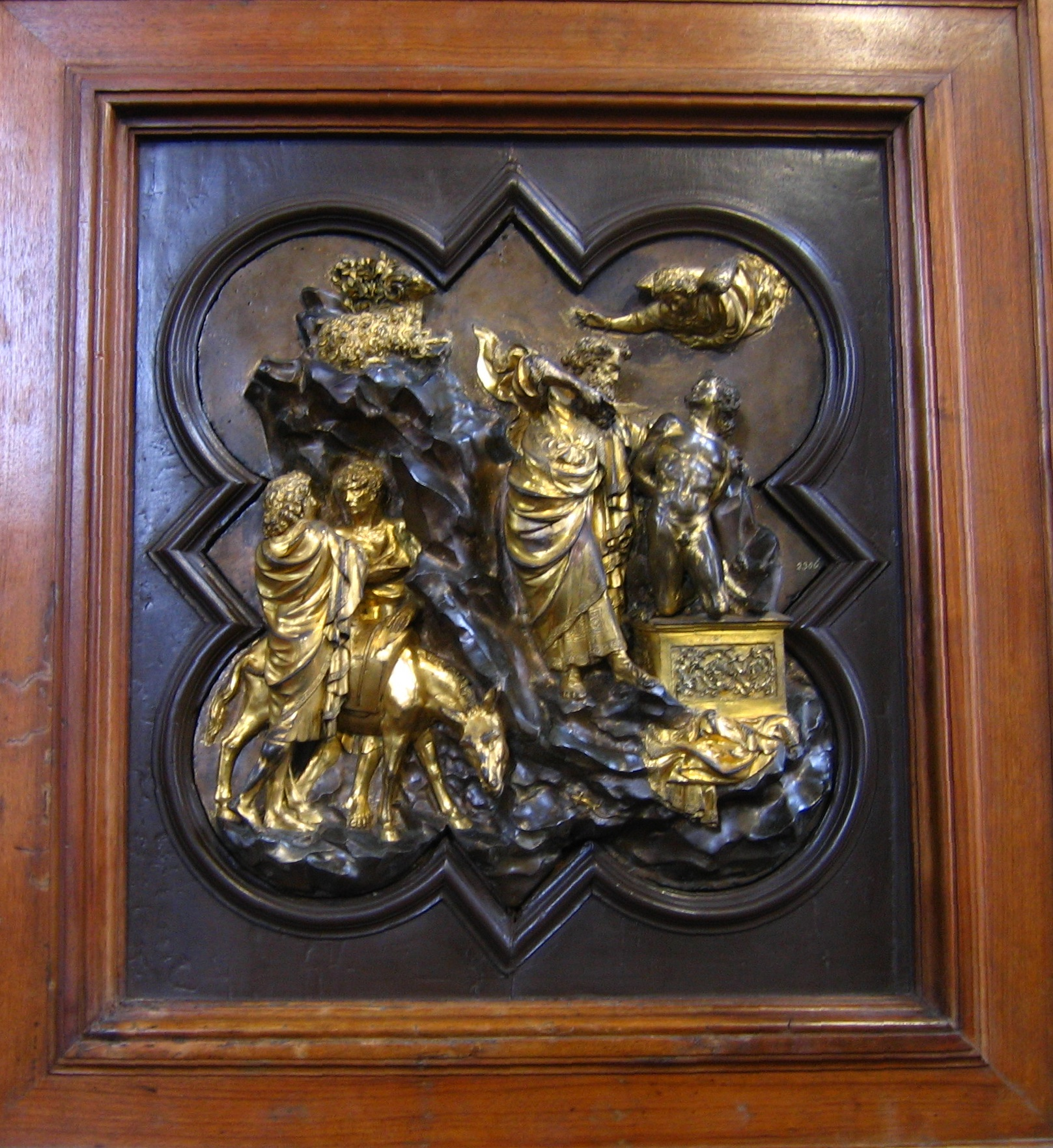
Relief on the Sacrifice of Isaac, by Ghiberti.

While in the rest of Europe Gothic art still prevailed, in Italy the Quattrocento or early Renaissance began in the 15th century. It was the moment when Man and Nature triumphed. Sculpture was ahead of architecture and painting, developing vertiginously. Its antecedents took place in the south of Italy, in the court of Frederick II, under whose protection an artistic school was born that already brought anticipated lights of what would be the Renaissance of the 15th century. It was the region of Tuscany during the previous Trecento period that inherited this new way of making sculpture in the figure of Nicola Pisano, followed by his son Giovanni Pisano, and later Andrea Pisano (first bronze doors of the Baptistery of Florence) and Nino Pisano.

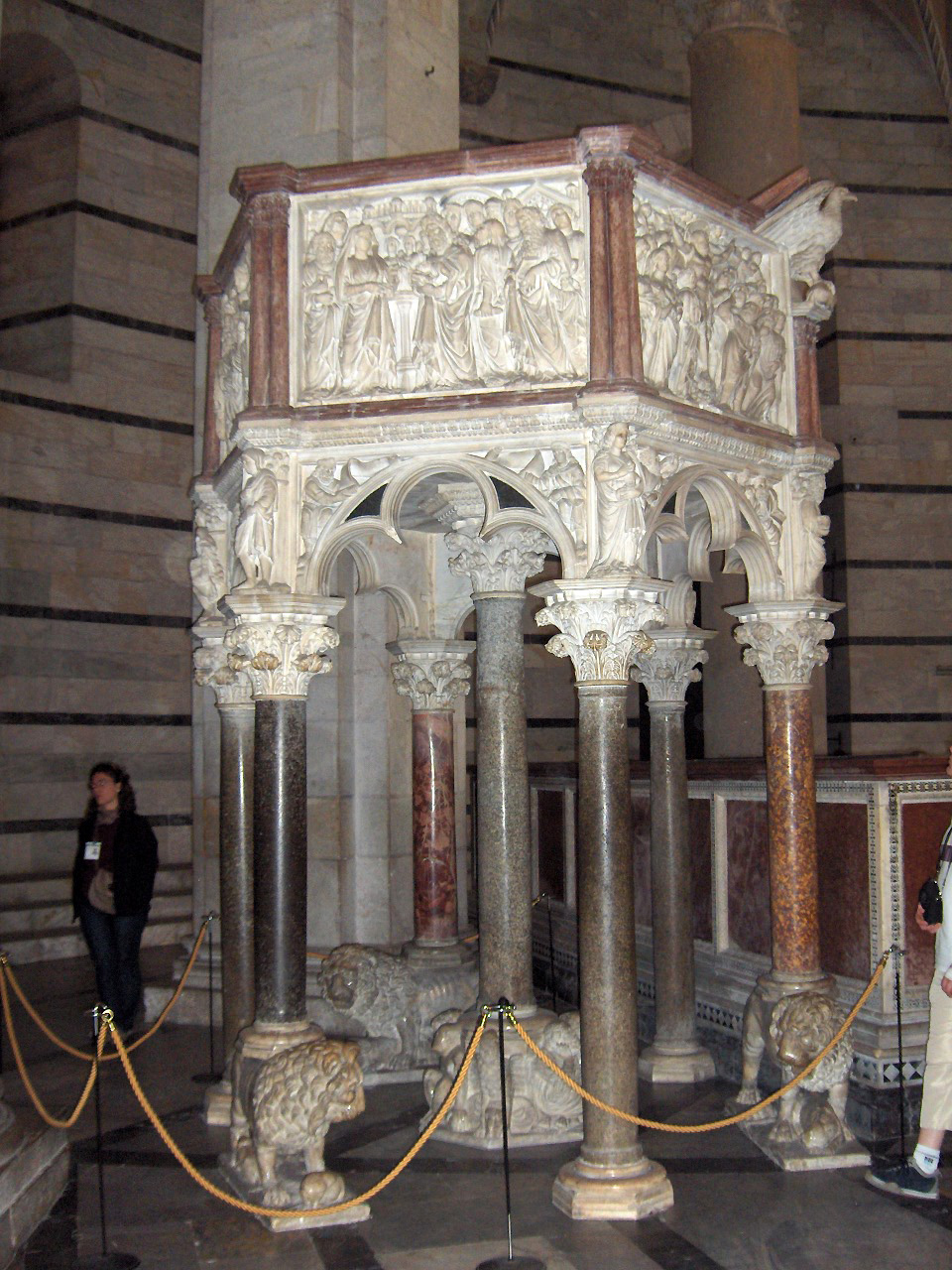
Pulpit in the Pisa Baptistery, by Nicolò Pisano, 1260, precursor of the Renaissance in Italy.

Nicola Pisanus (he signed his works with this appellative), whose name was Nicola de Apulia, came from this region of southern Italy to settle in Pisa (Tuscany). In Pisa (as in most regions of Europe) Romanesque art was still maintained and Gothic art was beginning to be used. Nicola Pisano was commissioned to carve the pulpit of the baptistery of the cathedral of this city. He did it following the new trends learned in Apulia, especially emphasizing the classical form of the naked Hercules. This work, the pulpit, is considered a precursor of the Italian Renaissance.

After this background, it will be the city of Florence (a prosperous city at this time, with the powerful Medici family, Maecenas and promoters of art), which will take the lead in the figure of its best representative: Lorenzo Ghiberti. From this moment on, no more medieval traces or ballast will be detected. For a century and a half, Florentine sculpture would dominate bust portraits, equestrian portraits, reliefs and in the round sculptures. The material used par excellence in this period was marble followed by bronze.

Ghiberti, Donatello and Jacopo della Quercia as the best, followed by della Robbia family, Verrocchio, Antonio Pollaiuolo and Agostino di Duccio, formed the group of great sculptors of the Florentine school of the Quattrocento. This stage of the Quattrocento began with the sculptural work on the reliefs of the doors of the Florence Baptistery by Lorenzo Ghiberti, a young sculptor in his twenties. The Baptistery already had two doors carved by Andrea Pisano in 1330, and in 1401 a competition was held for the remaining two. The competition was won by Ghiberti (in competition with Brunelleschi), completing the first of the two doors in 1424; his work was admired and highly regarded, so the city commissioned the second door from him. He invested about twenty years in carving each one; it was practically his life's work. This second door made by Ghiberti and fourth of the baptistery is known as the Gates of Paradise, so named by Michelangelo and considered one of the landmarks of the Quattrocento.

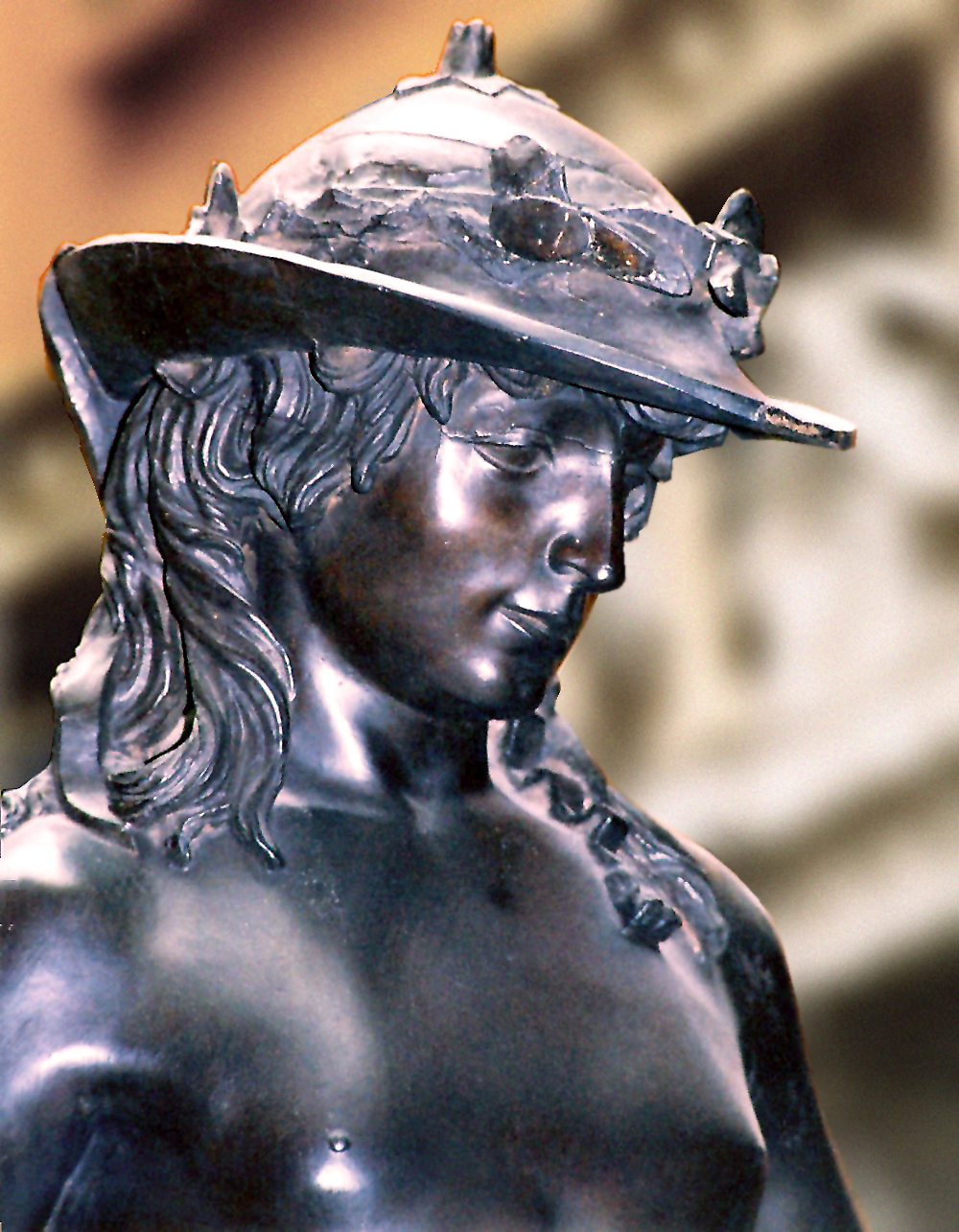
Donatello's David.

The second great sculptor of this period was Donatello, ten years younger than Ghiberti. He was much more multifaceted in his work, concentrating mainly on the human figure. Donatello is considered in Art History as the precursor of Michelangelo and is, in truth, an independent, fiery and realistic artist. His main interest was the human figure in different ages, covering all kinds of types, varied gestures and expressing in his work the most heterogeneous spiritual states. On the other hand, Donatello is considered a great expert in children's themes, especially in the expression of the joy of children (tribunes of the cathedrals of Florence and Prato). In round sculpture Donatello spread the Renaissance portrait of the bust cut horizontally across the chest and not on pedestal (as was customary in Roman sculpture). Examples: Bust of Antonio de Narni wearing a large cameo around his neck; terracotta bust of St. Lawrence, depicted as a young deacon, in the Old Sacristy of San Lorenzo in Florence. This manner of presenting portrait busts was adopted by Renaissance sculptors and continued almost until the Baroque period. In the 16th century the bust was lengthened until it was cut at the waist. Also within the round sculpture, Donatello was the precursor of the figure on horseback (in bronze) in homage to a great personage and placed in the center of a public square. The first equestrian statue by Donatello was the one known as Gattamelata (condottiero Erasmo de Narni).

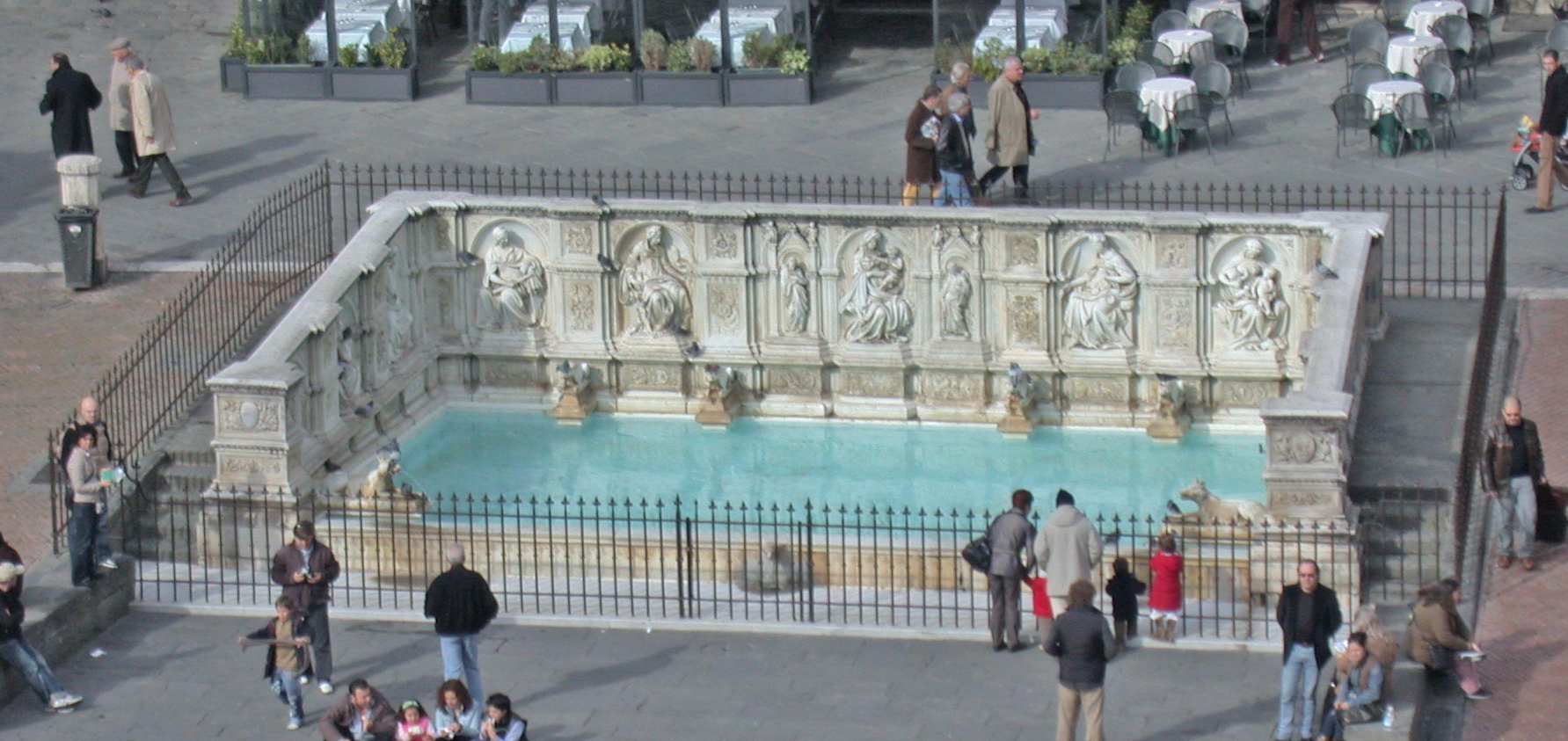
Gaia Fountain in Siena.

Jacopo della Quercia (died 1438) is the third great sculptor of this Florentine school and the only one of the group who was not born in Florence but in Siena. He belongs to the generation of Ghiberti. His style is grandiloquent and massive, in contrast to the detailed style of Ghiberti. His masterpiece was the central portal of San Petronio in Bologna, begun in 1425. It is a series of reliefs depicting Genesis and the infancy of Jesus, with busts of prophets and the image of the Virgin of San Petronio. In his reliefs dominates the monumentality and the treatment of herculean nudes, anticipating the style of Michelangelo. Jacopo della Quercia is the author of the Gaia Fountain in Siena, of the tombs of Ilaria del Caretto in Luca and of Galeazzo Bentivoglio in Bologna.

The group of the Robbia family is headed by Luca della Robbia (died 1482), who devoted himself almost entirely to the treatment of childhood and youth of the female figure. Luca created a school in which he introduced the technique of glazed clay, which appeared in the most diverse subjects, from the small relief to the altarpiece with copious figures. He also worked in marble and bronze. Andrea della Robbia, nephew of Luca, was the most gifted of his followers. He is the author of the tondos (circular medallions) of children carved in the Spedale degli Innocenti in Florence. The last of the group was Giovanni della Robbia, who was not only a sculptor, but also a decorator and, on occasion, a potter.

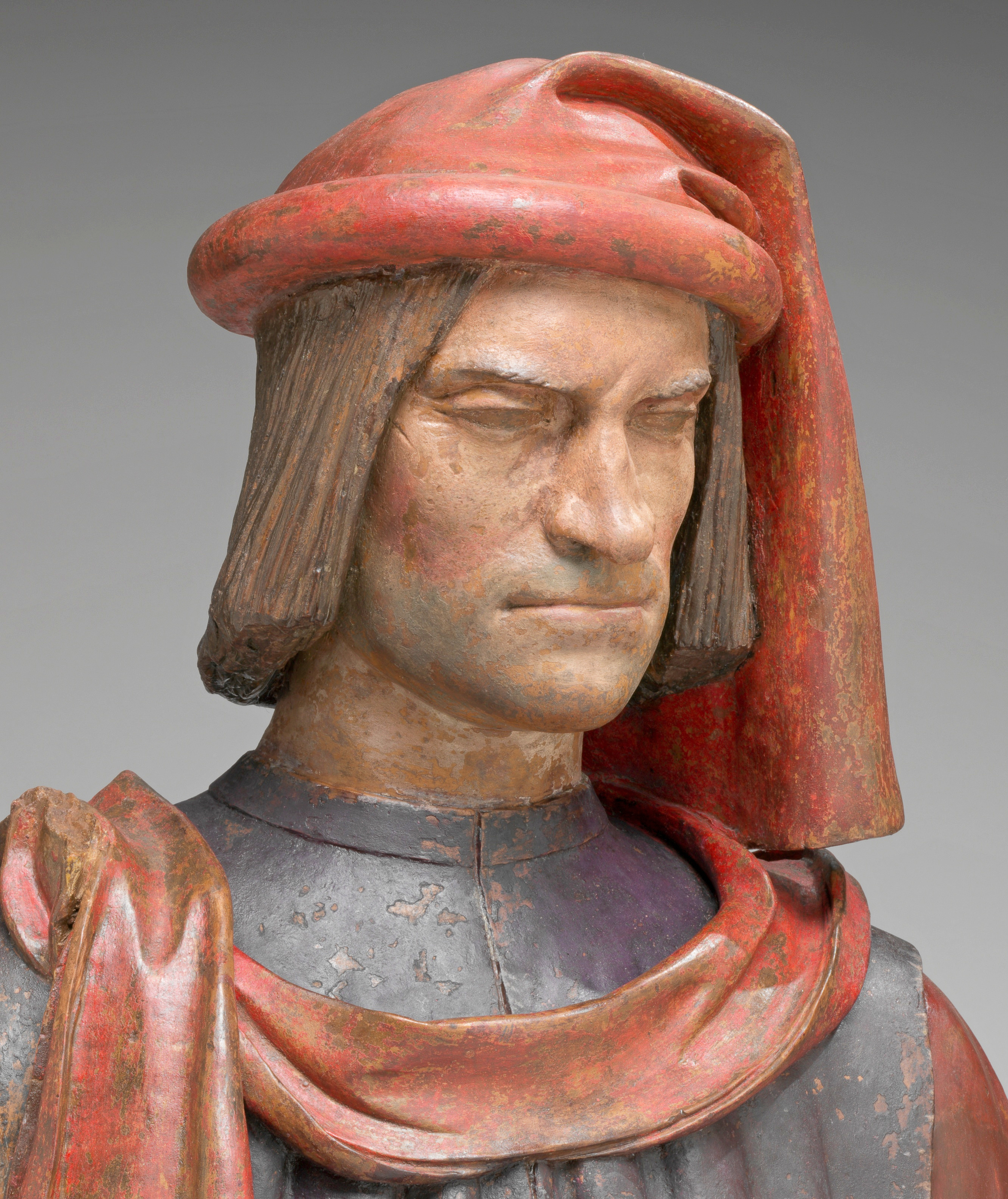
Lorenzo de' Medici by Verrocchio.

Andrea del Verrocchio (1435–1488) was greatly influenced by the works of Donatello to the point of repeating some of his themes, such as the David in Florence or the equestrian statue of the condottiere Colleone in Venice (both in bronze). Verrocchio is characterized by his deep anatomical study. Antonio Pollaiuolo was also a good Florentine representative of the interpretation of corporeal energy and violent movement. His masterpiece in this style is Hercules and Antaeus, kept in the Bargello Museum. Agostino di Duccio (1418–1481) was also a follower of Donatello, imitating his famous schiacciato relief style, especially in the decoration of the façade of the oratory of San Bernardino in Perugia and in the Malatesta temple in Rimini.

Another great sculptor who worked in Modena was Guido Mazzoni (died 1518), whose work was mostly done in painted terracotta, a technique that was then in great demand. One of his most famous compositions was the Lamentation over the dead Christ for the church of San Giovanni in Modena, which in turn must have influenced the work of the same title produced by Juan de Juni in 1463, following a trip to the cities of Bologna, Modena and Florence.

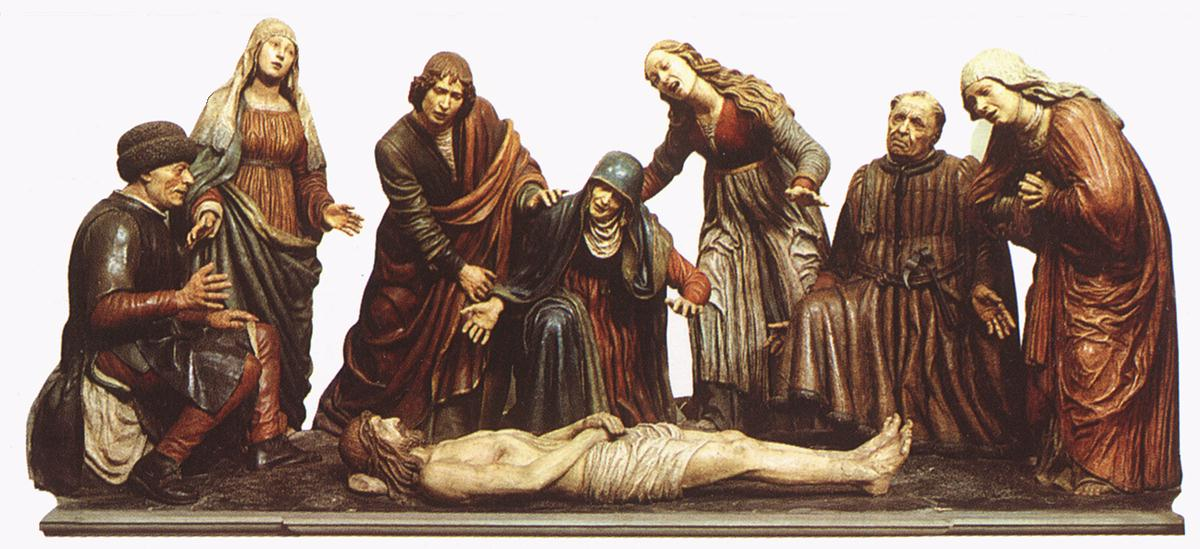
Lamentation over the dead Christ by Mazzoni.

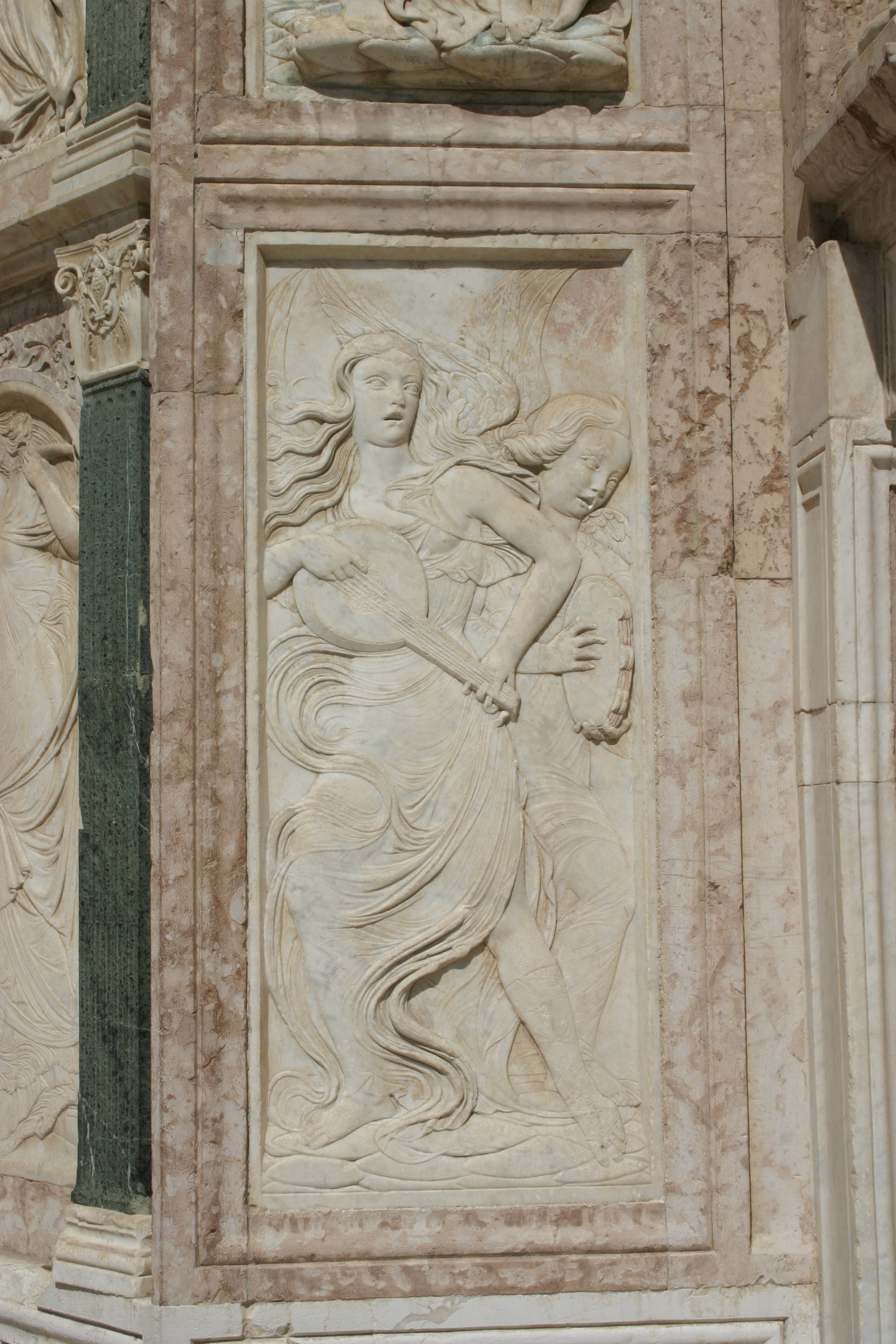
Reliefs by Agostino di Duccio in the oratory of San Bernardino (Perugia).

=== Cinquecento ===
The Cinquecento or full Renaissance developed throughout the 16th century with differentiated characteristics in each of the two halves of the century, with classicism dominating in the first half and mannerism in the second. It was the triumph of the experiences of the Quattrocento. One of its main characteristics is the taste for monumental grandeur, always bearing in mind the discovery of the classical Laocoön and His Sons, discovered in 1506. While the artists of the Quattrocento created a school in Florence, the artists of the Cinquecento created their works and developed their art mainly in the city of Rome, which became the artistic center of the new century. Florence remained an important Renaissance city, and masterpieces of art continued to be made in the Tuscan capital during this period, such as the David, the sepulchres of the Medici Chapels, Cellini's Perseus, etc. The representative artist of this period is Michelangelo, a character of great strength and personality.

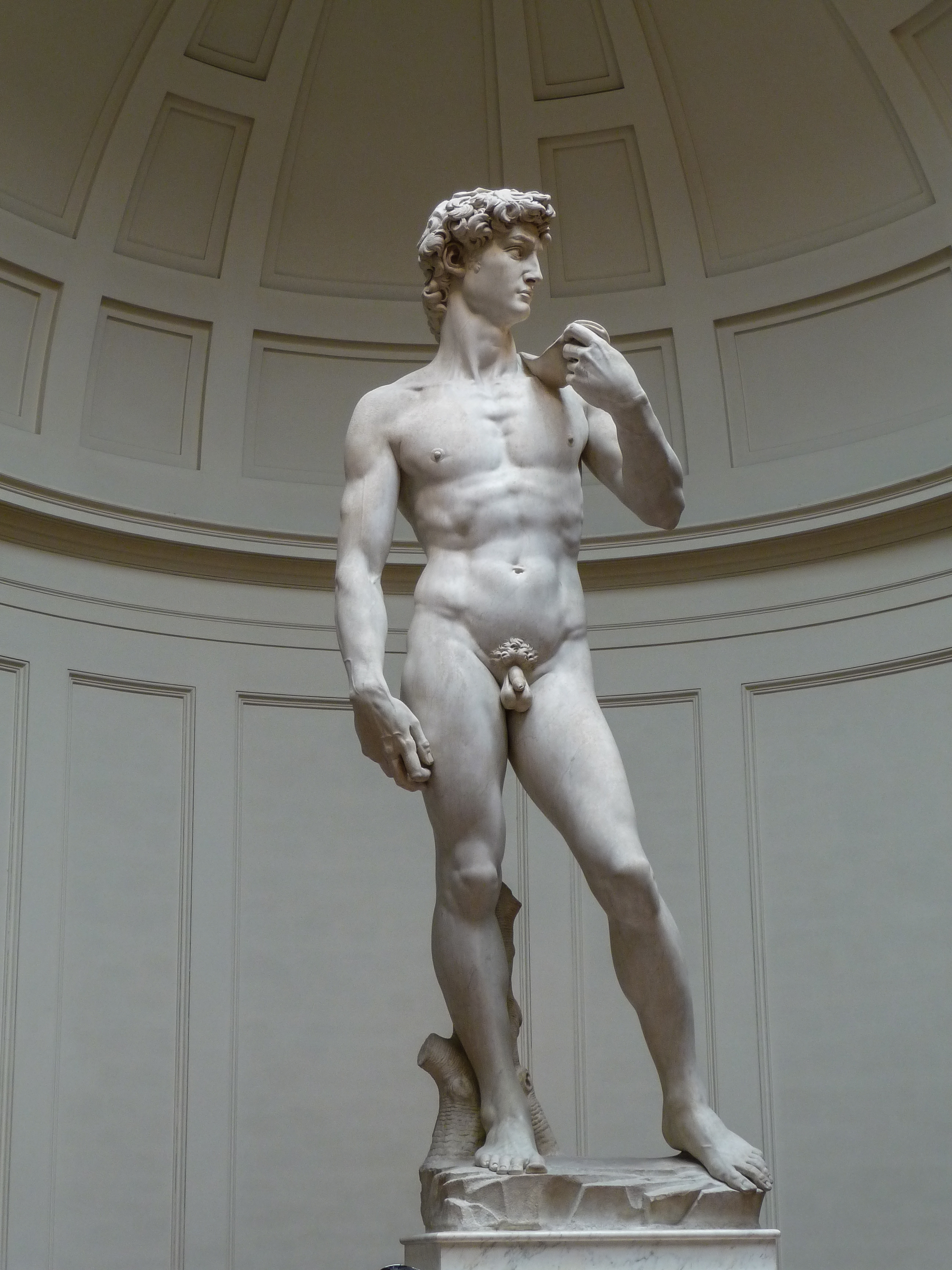
Michelangelo's David.

Michelangelo Buonarroti, also a disciple of the Florentine school, summarizes in his person almost all the sculptural art of his time in Italy (1475–1564). In the first thirty years of his life he preserved his chisel some of the traditions of the 15th century, producing moderate and beautiful but vigorous works. To this first epoch we owe his highly regarded sculptures of the Madonna of Bruges and the Pietà with some Bacchus and Cupids and the David of Florence. But from the year in which the popes began to commission him to build grandiose monuments, he created a gigantic style, very vigorous, full of passion, independent and called terribilità uniquely his own. Of this genre are the sculptures of the tombs of the Medici in their chapel in Florence (of Giuliano and his brother Lorenzo, whose seated statue is known by the name of Il Pensieroso for its pensive attitude) and the statues that the artist prepared for the tomb of Pope Julius II, especially the famous Moses that he found in the basilica of San Pietro in Vincoli.

Sansovino (his proper name is Andrea Contucci) was an artist educated among Florentine artists who manifests himself in his sculptures, a lover of the external form, anatomy and classicism, especially in the statues that decorate the mausoleums of Cardinal Ascanio Sforza and Bishop Basso Rovere in the church of Santa Maria del Popolo, as well as others in Florence and Venice. His disciple Jacobo Sansovino worked mainly in Venice, being the great disseminator of Michelangelo's work. One of his best sculptural works is the Bacchus.

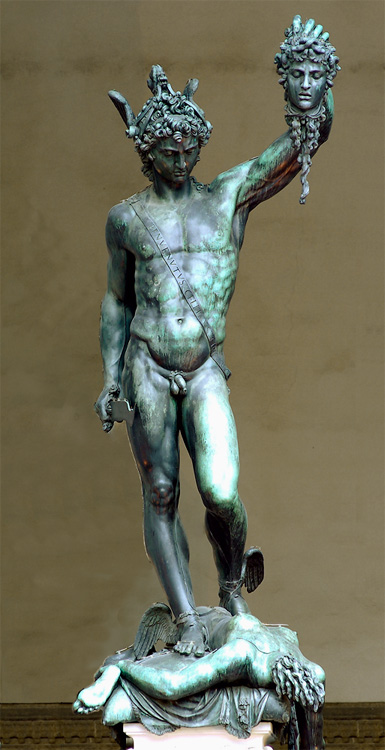
Perseus with the Head of Medusa by Cellini.

Benvenuto Cellini was, in addition to being a sculptor, a great goldsmith. His monumental bronze work of Perseus with the head of Medusa was a symbol of the triumph of the Medici family over the Florentine Republic. He is the author of the marble Christ of the monastery of El Escorial.

Bandinelli and Ammanati were two contemporary sculptors of Cellini who sculpted the monumental statues of Hercules and Cacus and Neptune for the Piazza della Signoria in Florence. The two Leoni, Leone and Pompey (father and son) were great bronze casters and worked mainly in Spain, during the reign of Philip II.

=== Mannerism ===
The term Mannerism refers to a style with its own characteristics within the Renaissance, in the 16th century, especially after 1520. The characteristic that best defines it is the constant search for the unconventional together with the destruction of a logical balance by applying deforming lines or postures, something that at first sight can be disconcerting for the spectator. It is the rejection of balance by adopting forced postures.

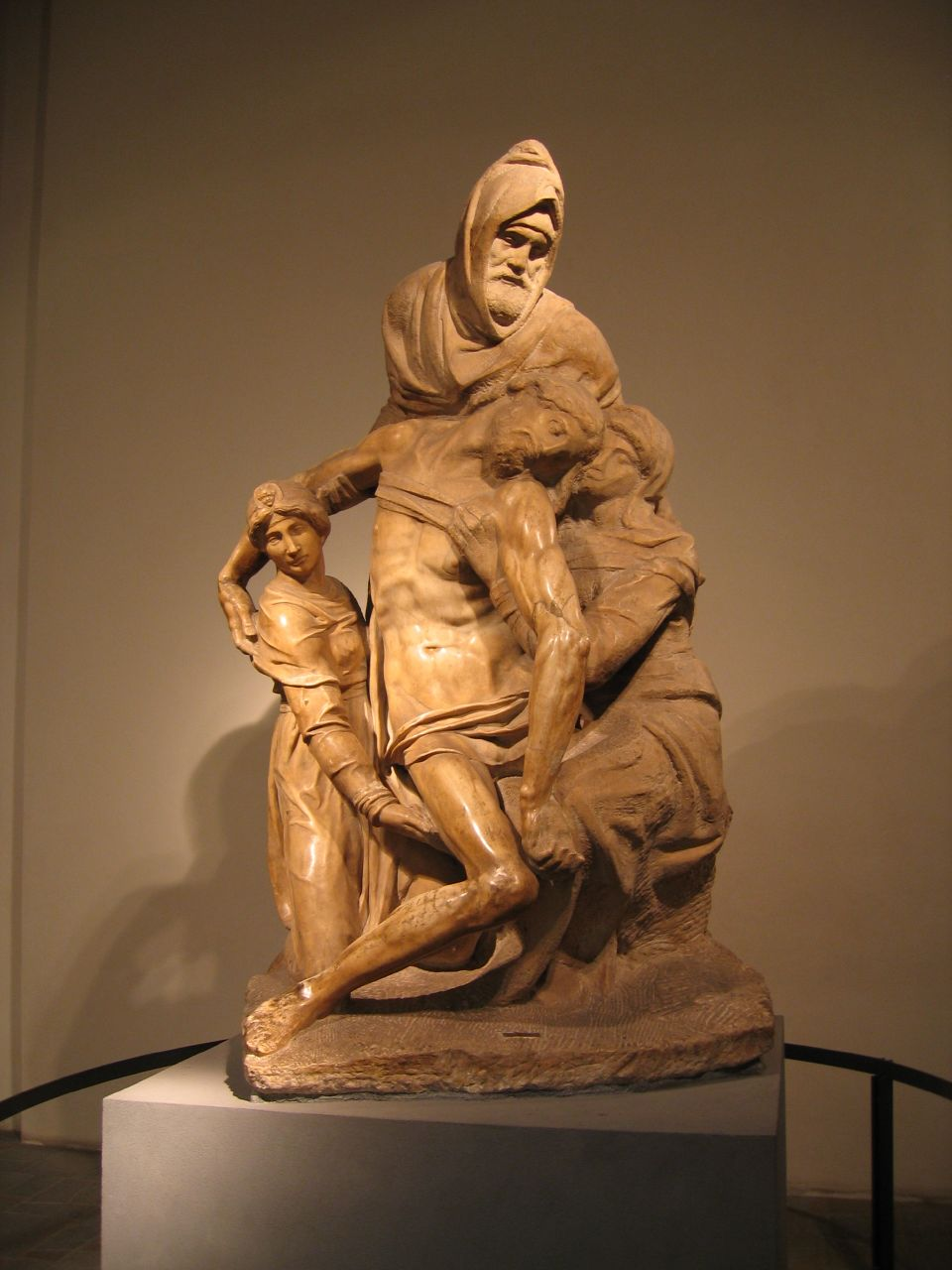
The Deposition by Michelangelo

In Mannerism, sculpture rejected classicism by seeking curvilinear and dynamic forms, the so-called serpentinata or composition of curves and counter-curves in which the bodies turned in on themselves, in narrow spaces and sometimes with very pronounced foreshortenings.

In Italy, Mannerist sculpture is represented by Giambologna ("John of Bologna"), for example the Rape of the Sabine Women, Benvenuto Cellini and Michelangelo, one of whose best examples is the Deposition where Christ is shown with serpentinata posture.

This style spread throughout Europe thanks to the extensive collection of engravings, and especially in the field of sculpture in the profusion of small bronzes from Italy. Thus it developed in the European courts of Francis I in Fontainebleau with Francesco Primaticcio, who was in charge of bringing copies of antiques from Rome. It also developed at the court of Rudolph II in Prague, and of Philip II at El Escorial, where academic correctness characterized the style of Mannerism employed by the Leoni family. Influenced by Michelangelo, Gaspar Becerra imposed his mannerist style on the reredos of the cathedral of Astorga, and it is in Valladolid, where Juan de Juni, in addition to Becerra, was located, where more sculpture of this classical-heroic type was made.

== French sculpture ==
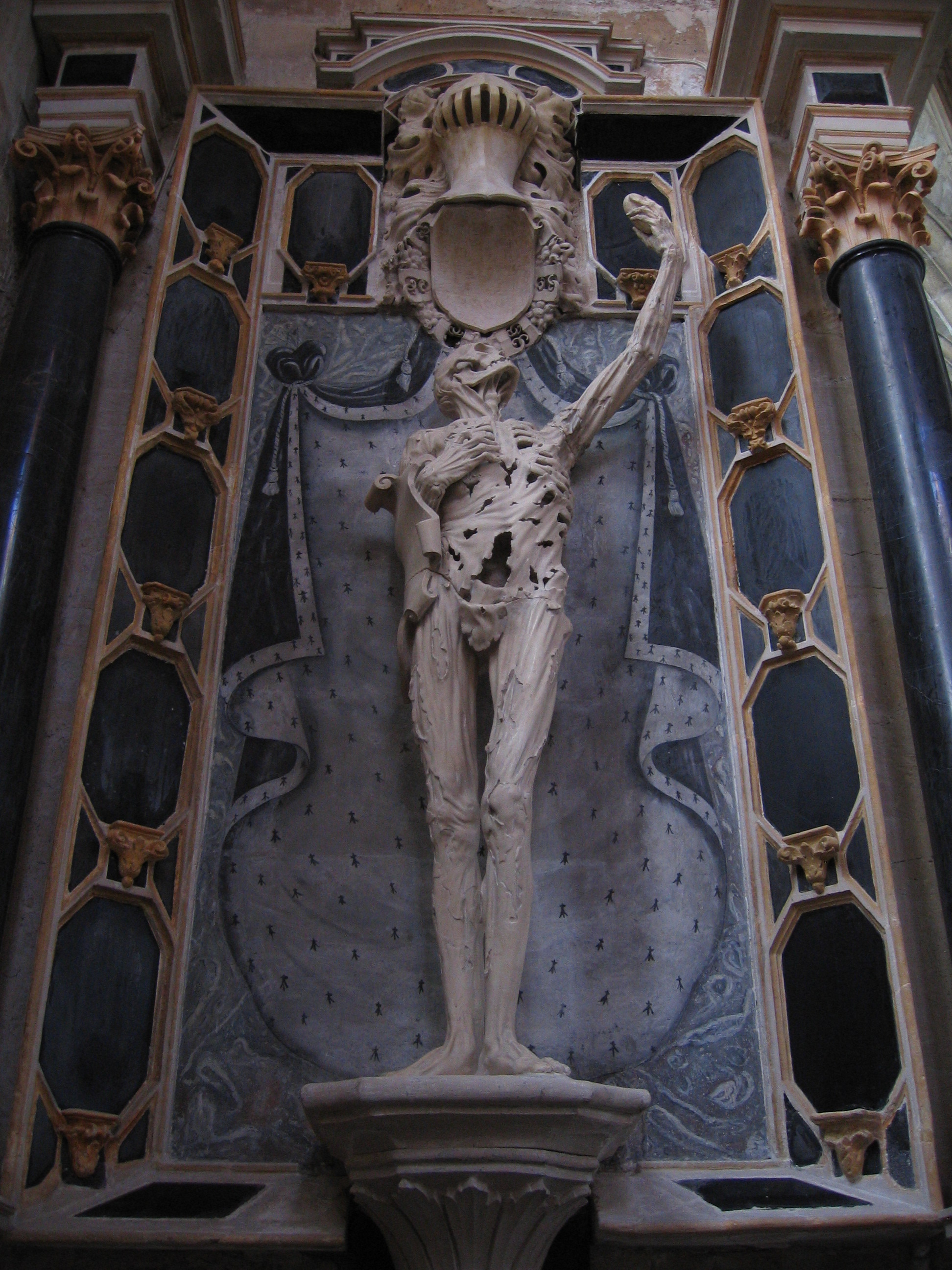
Memorial to the Heart of René de Chalon in Bar-le-Duc by Ligier Richier.

The political interest of the kings of France to settle their dominions in Italian lands had cultural consequences, since there were several Italian artists who from the second half of the fifteenth century settled in the French court, being Francis I the main Maecenas of these artists, including Leonardo da Vinci. Around 1460, the sculptor Francesco Laurana, who is considered the introducer of the Renaissance in France, settled in Provence and worked mainly in the southern part of the country. One of his best known sculptures is the tomb of Charles IV of Anjou in the cathedral of Le Mans.

One of the most treated themes in French sculpture of this period is that of the Holy Burial and sepulchral monuments where the figure of the recumbent is treated with great realism. The deceased is represented as a corpse or even as a skeleton; at the time of the transition, as is the case of Joanna of Bourbon in the Louvre. Of this type are two works by Ligier Richier with polychrome in black, white and gray: the Memorial of René de Chalon in Bar-le-Duc in which the partially fleshless skeleton tends a heart towards the sky; and the emaciated recumbent body of Philippa of Guelders in the Church des Cordeliers in Nancy. This allegory of the resurrection of the dead comes by way of the Italian "terribilità" and the unveiling of the interior of the body, even if it does not present a perfect anatomy to the eyes of science.

Michel Colombe, sculptor of Queen Anne of Brittany at the beginning of the 16th century, who commissioned the tomb of her parents, Duke Francis II and Margaret de Foix in the cathedral of Nantes, stands out with the influence of Italian work. In the recumbent figures of the sepulcher Gothic features are still visible, but not in the decorative elements and in four life-size figures of the Virtues placed in the corners of the funerary monument.

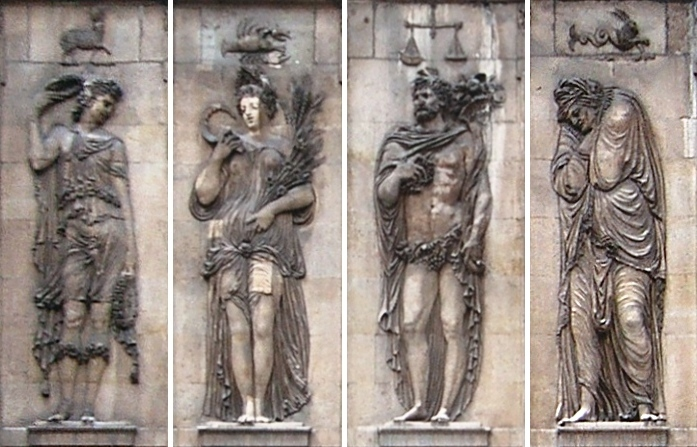
The Four Seasons by Jean Goujon, (c.1547) (Musée Carnavalet, Paris).

His nephew Guillaume Regnault, also a sculptor, succeeded him as sculptor to the Queen. His masterpieces are the recumbent statues of the royal advisor Louis Porcher and his wife, now in the Louvre Museum.

Also in the early sixteenth century, Jean Goujon (called the French Phidias) began his work in Rouen, and in 1544 he went to Paris to be appointed royal sculptor in 1547, where he carried out numerous commissions such as the allegories of The Four Seasons, the Nymphs, some Caryatids for the tribune of the Musicians and made the signs of the Zodiac for the old town hall of Paris. During these same years Germain Pilon made numerous funerary monuments with great influence of Michelangelo, among which stands out the Resurrected Christ with figures of the guardians, a group for the chapel of Henry II preserved in the Louvre Museum, whose figures are inspired by pictorial compositions such as the Joseph of Arimathea by Rosso Fiorentino. The dead Christ resembles the engravings of Parmigianino, as the figures look for the diagonals and the foreshortenings are spectacular, with the folds of the clothes tight and very thin, recalling the reliefs of classical antiquity. His disciple Bartholomew Prieur, who worked in the service of Henry IV of France, was a faithful follower. Pierre Puget, called the "French Bernini", was already a late Renaissance sculptor; his work Milon of Croton was outstanding.

== Spanish sculpture ==
The ideas and sculptural forms of the Italian Renaissance penetrated into Spain with the Florentine artists who came to work at the Spanish court during the 15th century, and continued to spread with the work of artists of various nationalities and of some Spaniards who had learned in Italy since the last years of that century. However, the new style did not become firmly established until the accession of King Charles I of Spain to the throne at the beginning of the 16th century.

Already in 1339 the art of the Pisans had arrived in Catalonia with the tomb of Santa Eulalia in the cathedral of Barcelona, carved by Lupo di Francesco, apart from some other influences described above. Almost a century later some reliefs were carved in the trascoro of the cathedral of Valencia by the Florentine Giuliano, a disciple of Ghiberti, along with others by Spanish hand. But these trials and attempts remained isolated until the arrival of other masters of the Florentine school at the end of the 15th century and the beginning of the following one.

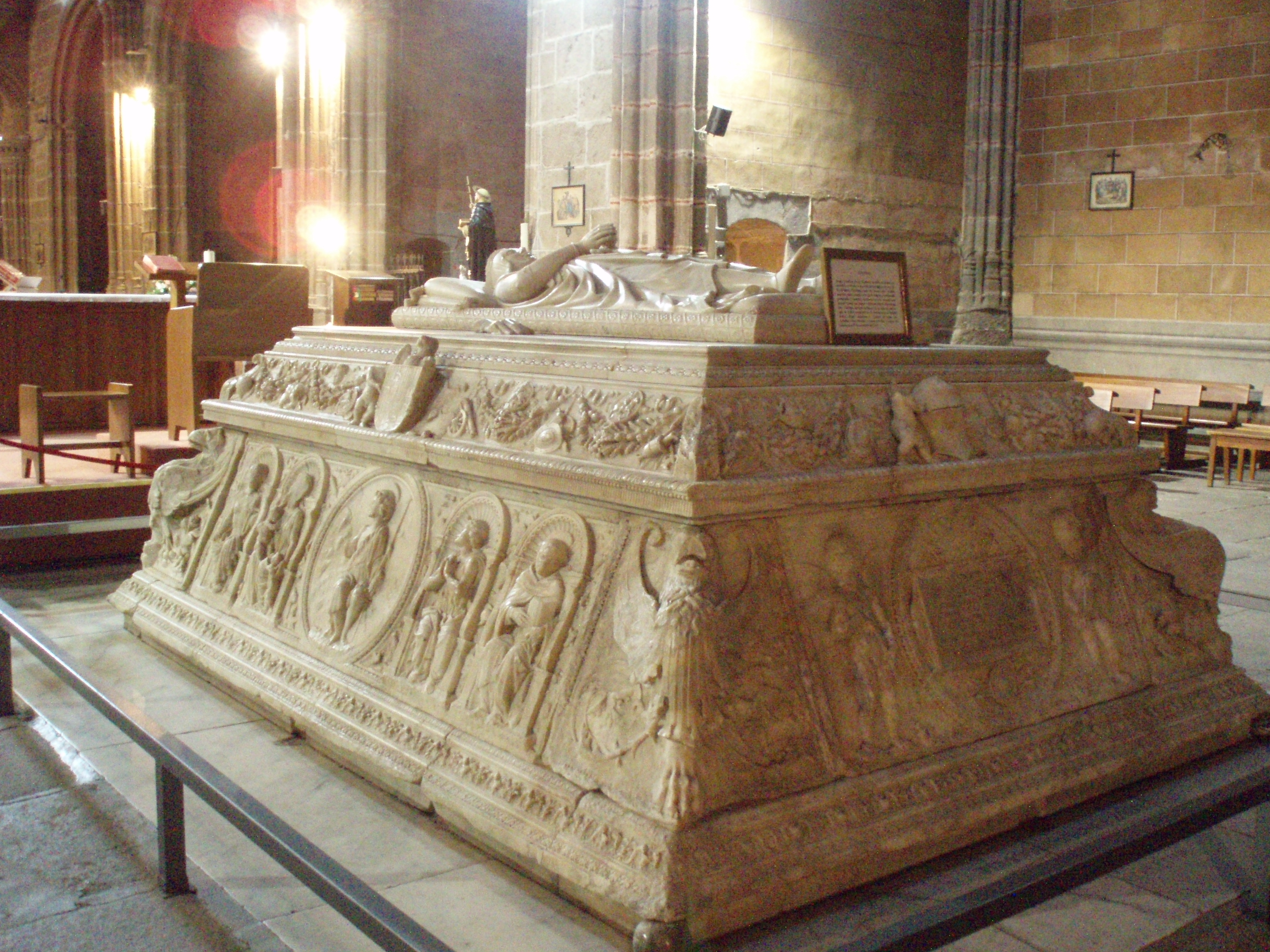
Sarcophagus of Prince John of Asturias, by the sculptor Domenico Fancelli.

Renaissance sculpture made its presence felt through three different channels: Italian sculptors sent for by Maecenas and who carried out their works in Spain; imported works, coming from Italian workshops; first generation of Spanish artists. In the first group are the sculptors Domenico Fancelli, Pietro Torrigiano and Jacopo Torni, also called the Indaco.

- Domenico Fancelli carved the tomb of the infant John (son of the Catholic Monarchs, died in 1497) in the church of the monastery of St. Thomas in Ávila, the tomb of the Catholic Monarchs in Granada and the mural mausoleum of Diego Hurtado de Mendoza in the cathedral of Seville (year 1509).
- Pietro Torrigiano was a great sculptor of terracotta to whom a Saint Jerome and a statue of the Virgin are attributed and are currently in the Museum of Seville.

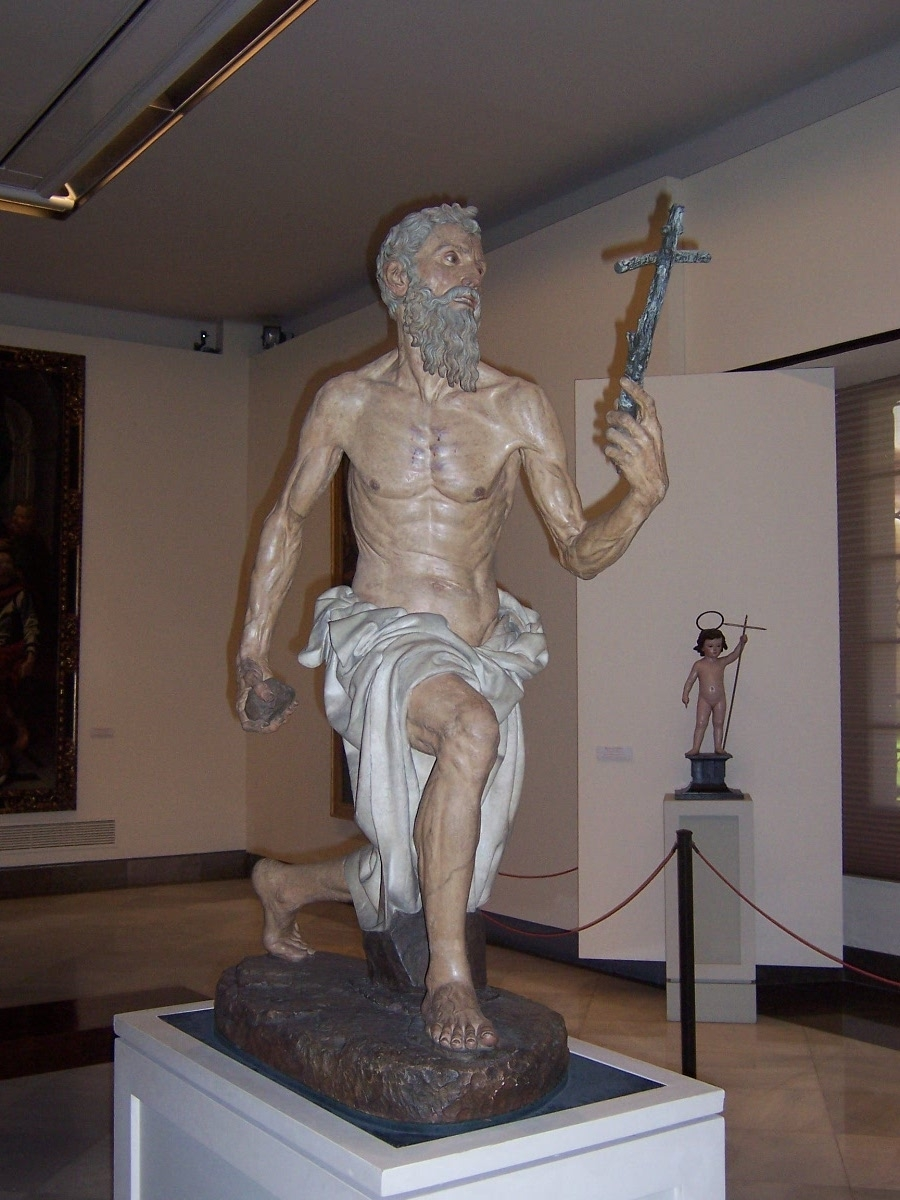
St. Jerome by Pietro Torrigiano

Among the works commissioned from Italy, the Saint John from Michelangelo's workshop for the city of Úbeda and a few reliefs from the workshop of the Della Robbia family serve as examples.

As for the Spanish sculptors, the first generation consisted of Vasco de la Zarza (the choir stalls of the cathedral of Avila), Felipe Bigarny (the main altarpiece of the cathedral of Toledo), Bartolomé Ordóñez (the choir stalls of the cathedral of Barcelona) and Diego de Siloé (the tomb of Don Alonso Fonseca in Santa Úrsula de Salamanca).

Alonso Berruguete and Juan de Juni, of French origin and with a workshop in Valladolid, author of the major altarpieces in the churches of Santiago and La Antigua, as well as many other works found in Segovia, Ciudad Rodrigo and other towns in Castile, stood out in the second third of the 16th century and continued until 1577. Other great masters of the Spanish Renaissance also emerged who, following Italian standards, knew how to give their works a purely Spanish character, creating a school in the different regions of the country.

The third third came with the classicist taste. The two Italian sculptors Leoni (Leone and Pompeyo, father and son) worked at the court of Emperor Charles, casting in bronze the statues of Charles I, Philip II and other members of the Royal Family.

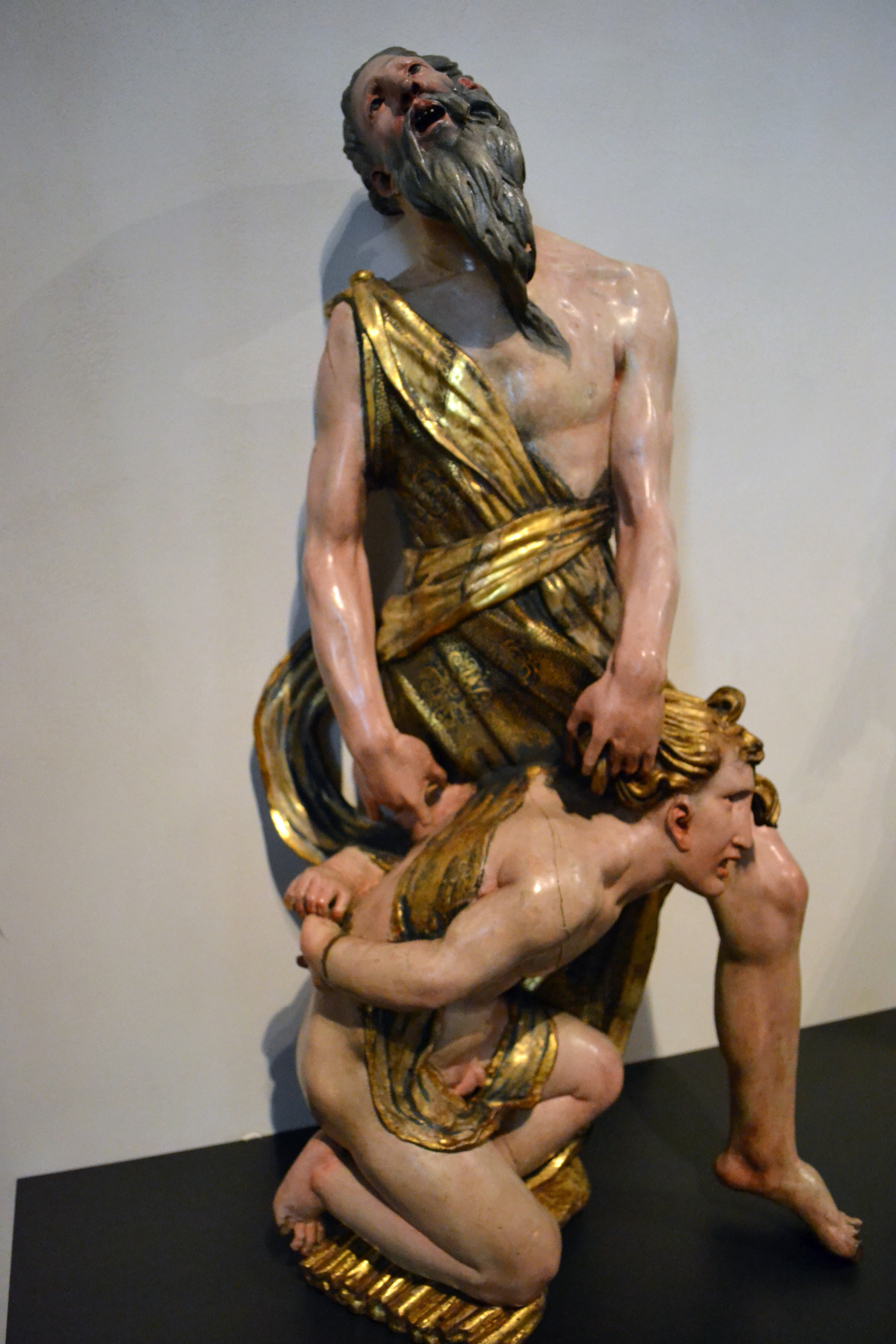
Sacrifice of Isaac by Alonso Berruguete.

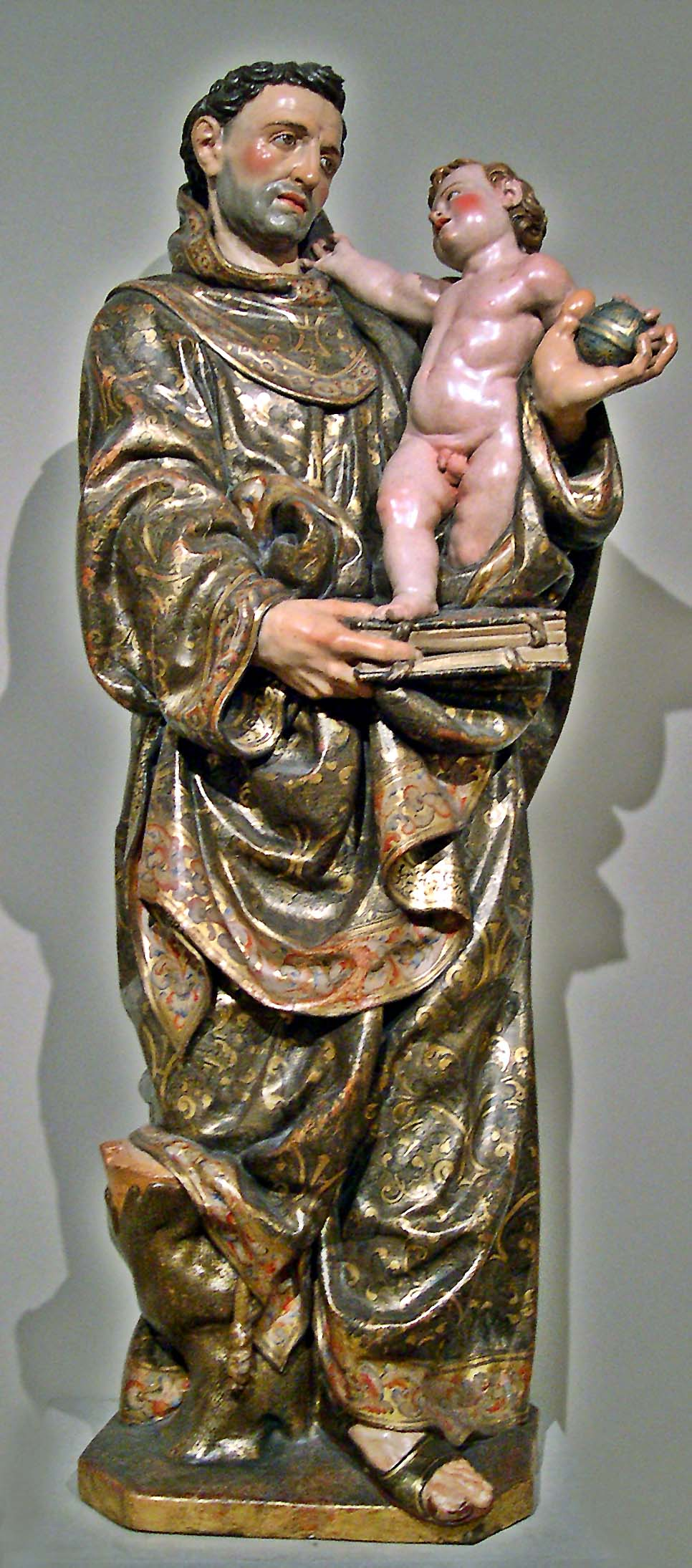
Saint Anthony of Padua, by Juan de Juni.

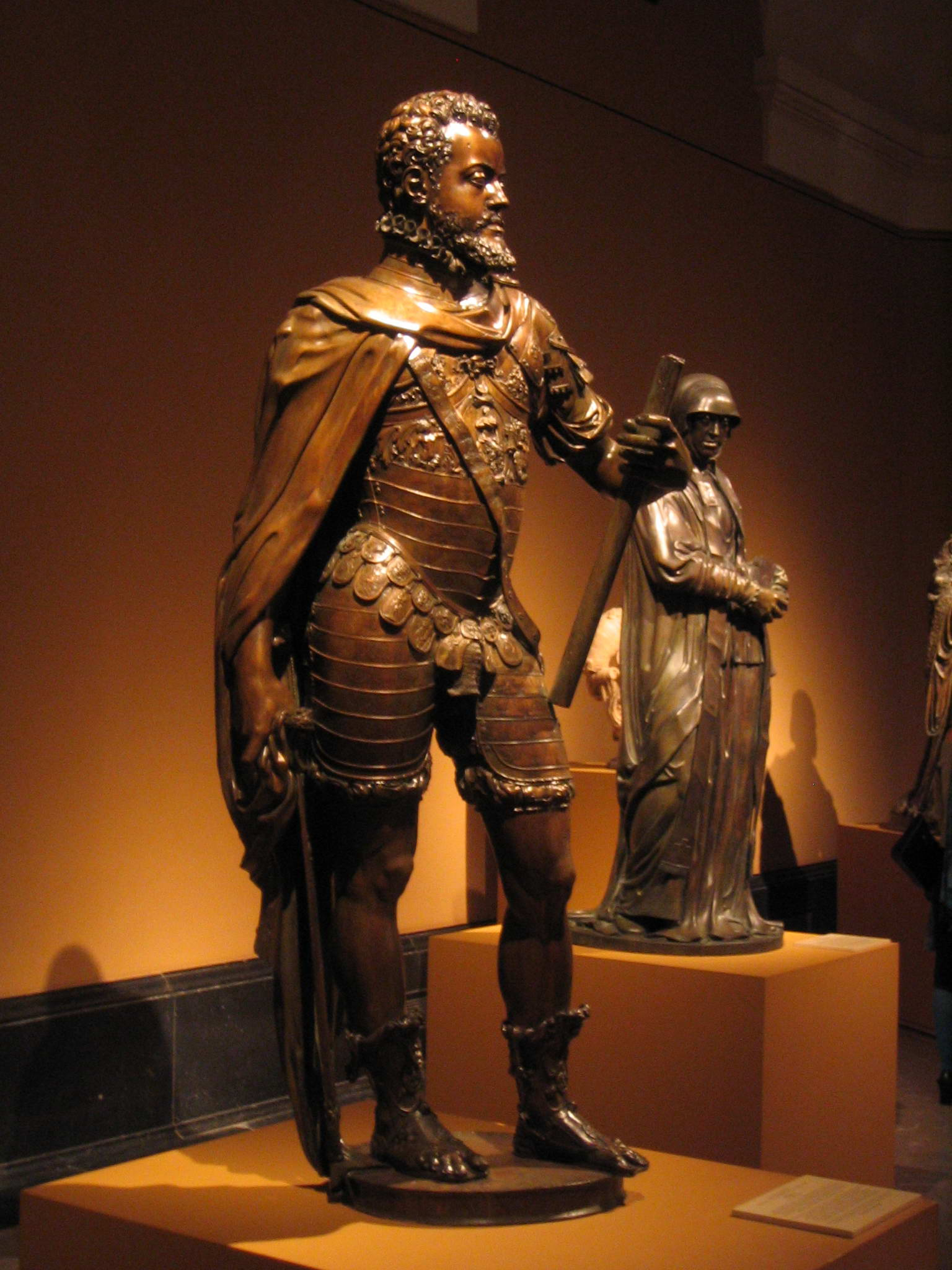
Philip II by Pompey and Leone Leoni.

=== Plateresque ===
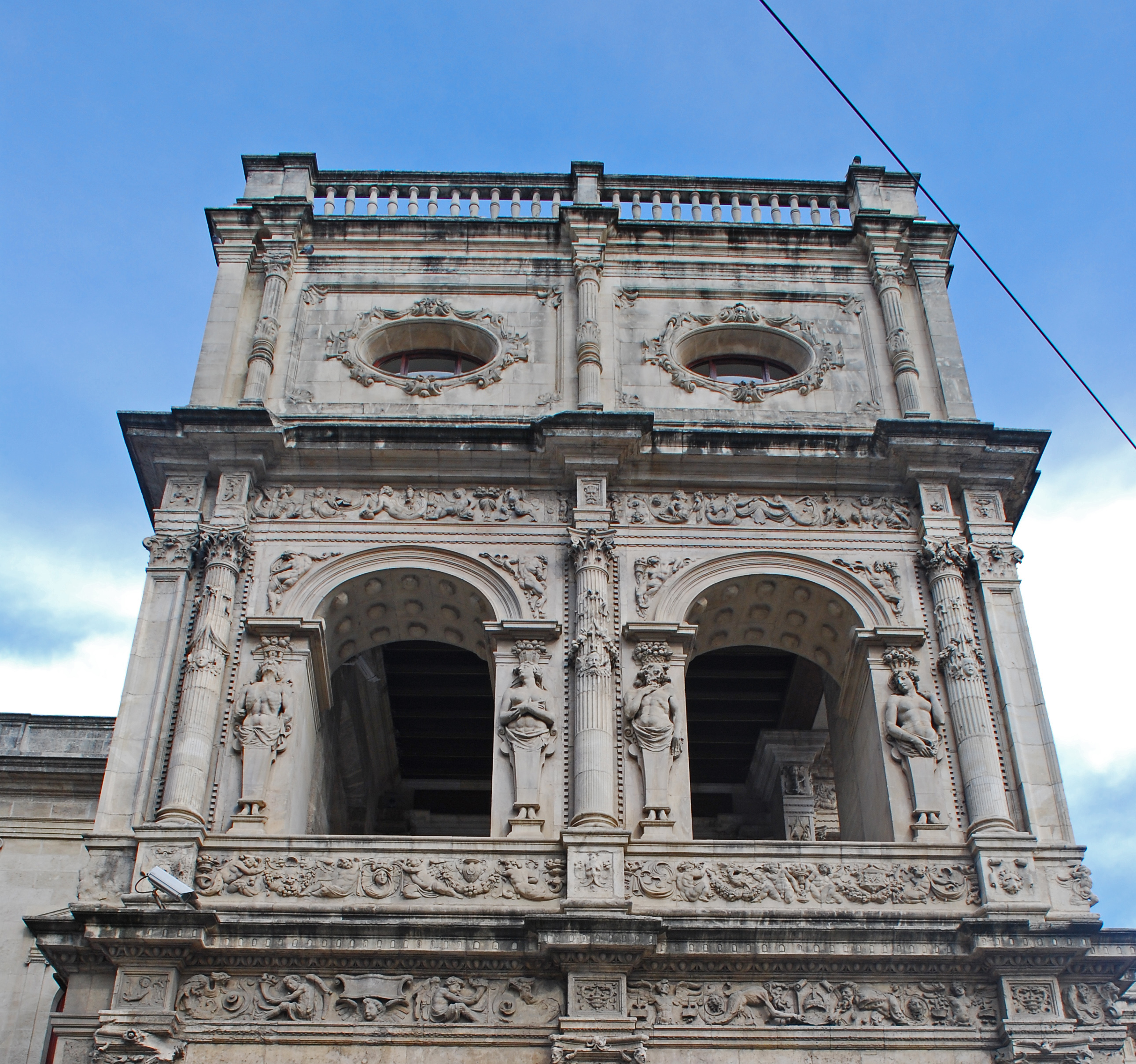
Plateresque lateral façade of the Seville City Hall

The Spanish Renaissance style, which corresponds to the Portuguese Manueline is also called Isabelline Gothic or Catholic Kings style, for having begun with the reign of these monarchs, although it extends to the time of Philip II. The term plateresque is usually used for architecture, but as it is a purely decorative art and form of sculptural ornamentation, it can be included in this small section.

It is characterised by the retention of certain Gothic and Mudejar elements within the Renaissance style. The façades are sculpted as if they were altarpieces, and together with the typical Renaissance cushioning, they feature columns with grotesques, abundant decoration, and Gothic-style windows. There is a proliferation of tondos or medallions and coats of arms placed in the keystones of the vaults and in the spandrels of the arches. This is a highly decorative genre. It reached its greatest exuberance in Andalusia. A good example is the façade of the Seville City Hall by Diego de Riaño.

== German sculpture ==
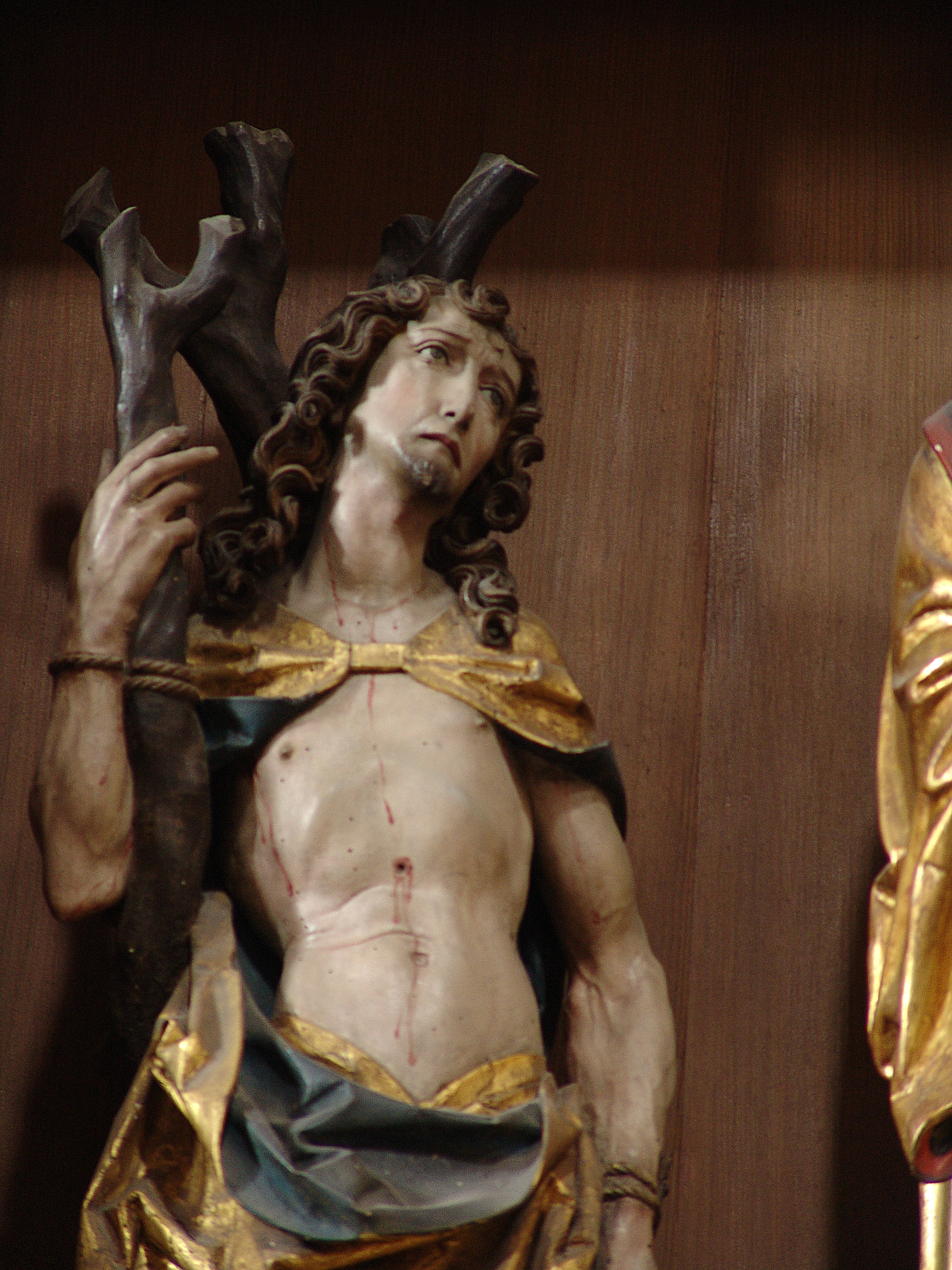
Detail of Saint Sebastian, polychrome wood sculpture by Riemenschneider.

The prosperity of the Germanic cities was consolidated with the extension of the Gothic period, producing in the first decades of the 16th century the introduction of Renaissance sculpture with the influence of the Italian Florentine school. Most of this sculpture was made in wood, due to the great forest wealth of its regions and with a magnificent polychromy and gilding. The German sculptors found it difficult to abandon the Gothic costumes and for their characters to acquire the classical spirit, as can be clearly seen in the works of Veit Stoss, in the altarpiece of the Virgin in St. Mary in Krakow, in the reliefs of the cathedral of Bamberg or in the Annunciation of the Rosary in the church of St. Lawrence in Nuremberg. Also in the same style are the sculptures of Tilman Riemenschneider, extraordinary works such as the Altar of the Annunciation in the church of Creglingen.

As "sculpted world" is known the character that sculpture adopted in the Germanic countries during the second half of the 15th century, which can be seen in the large polyptychs of altars of some German churches and cathedrals. These are often altars with two or even four fully sculpted leaves, with spires and high pinnacles that house, in their central part, the "box", with a religious scene. Vasari, a connoisseur of the German style, said about it:

(...) patience and great subtlety... the sculptors operate continuously in such a way that they reduce things to such subtlety that they leave the world astonished.

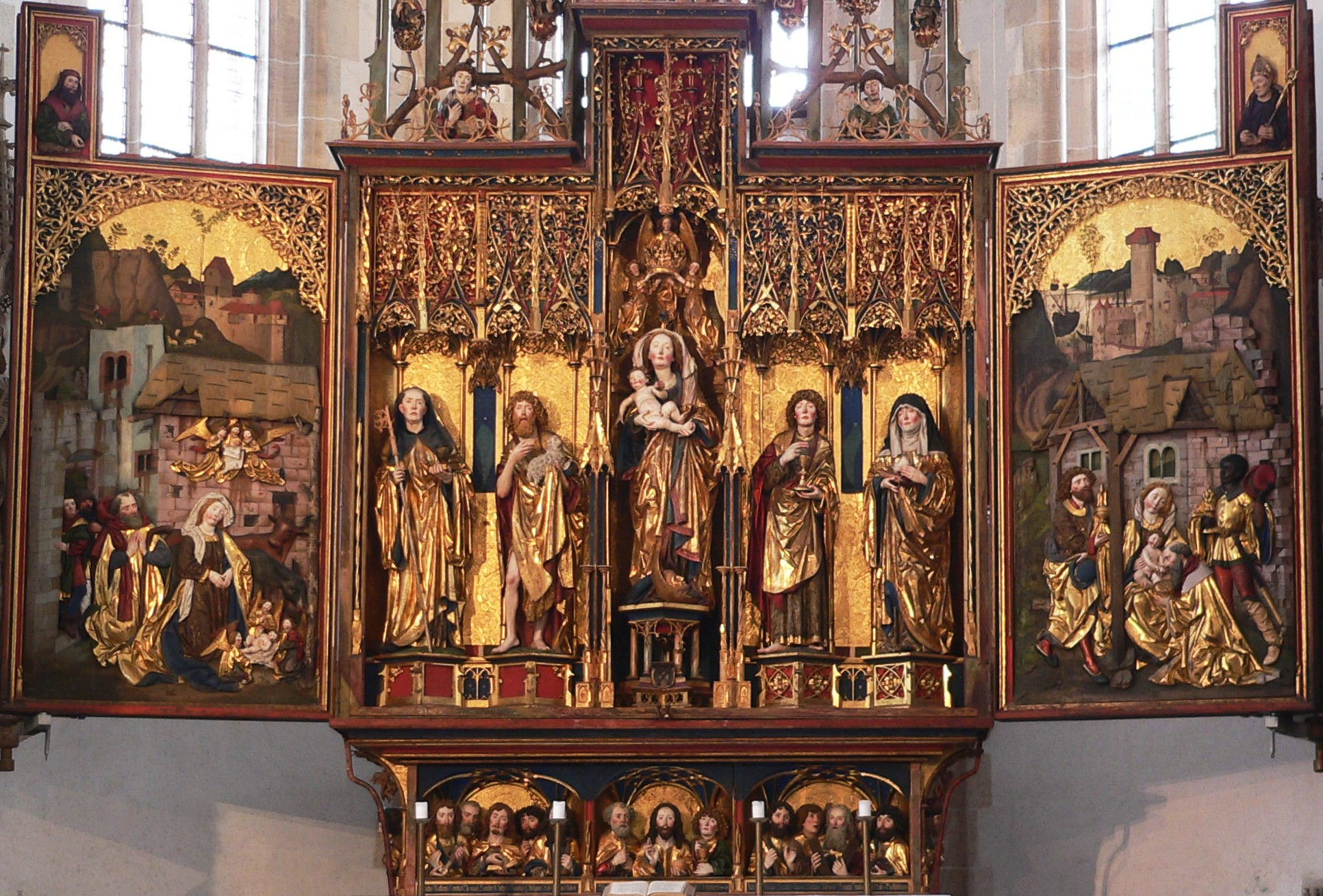
Central box of the Blaubeurer altar by Michel Erhart.

Michel Erhart of Ulm achieved great stylistic control. His most important work is the altar of the Benedictine monastery of Blaubeurer (Baden-Württemberg) where five large polychrome sculptures can be seen in the box. In the Germanic peripheral territories, in South Tyrol, the sculptor Michael Pacher worked; among his works, the main altar of St. Wolfgang, eleven meters high and where painting is masterfully combined with sculpture, stands out.

German sculpture was short-lived in the Renaissance period. Peter Vischer stood out as a sculptor along with other members of his family, inspired more directly by the Italian Quattrocento, as can be seen in the tomb of St. Sebald (1507–1519) in Nuremberg, as well as his participation in the mausoleum of Emperor Maximilian in Innsbruck, which was to group forty larger-than-life-size statues and one hundred smaller statuettes with forty busts of emperors. Only a third of this work was completed, and the sculptures were cast in bronze. Albrecht Dürer was also involved in this work, for which he designed the Head of King Arthur and made the full body sculpture Vischer, with the decoration and armor in medieval style, but with the clear contrapposto of a hero of Antiquity.

== Sculpture in the Netherlands ==
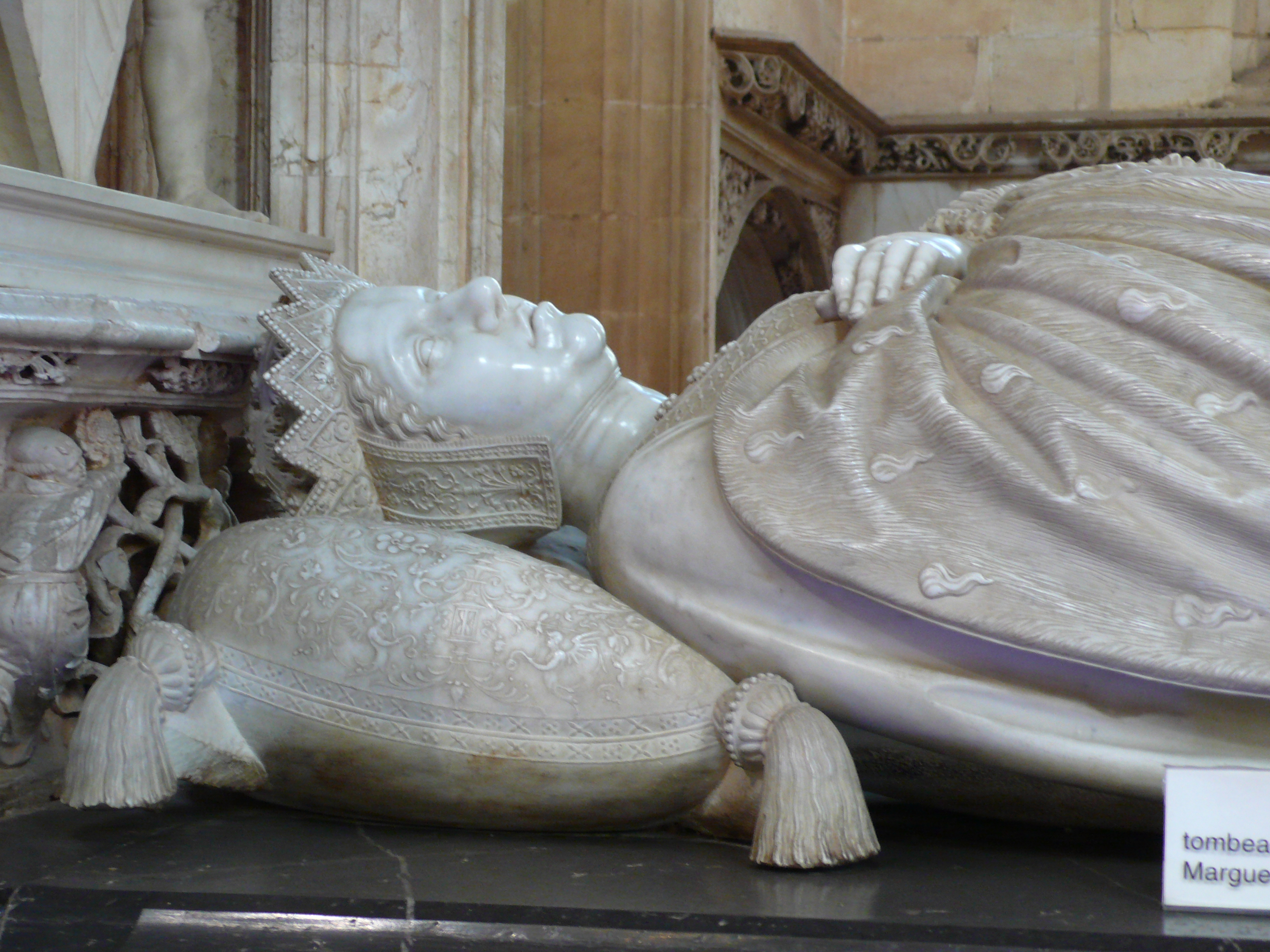
Detail of the tomb of Margaret of Austria in Bourg-en-Bresse, by Conrad Meit.

In the Netherlands, artistic activities had been fully developed and consolidated during the Gothic period to very high levels, which makes it understandable that they were reluctant to admit other criteria. Thus, the acceptance of the new style coming from Italy was late and the Gothic decorations were still maintained for a long time. In the realization of altarpieces, choir stalls and religious furnishings including sculpture, wood carving was used, in which Renaissance elements were elaborated in the style of those made in the Lombard part of Italy.

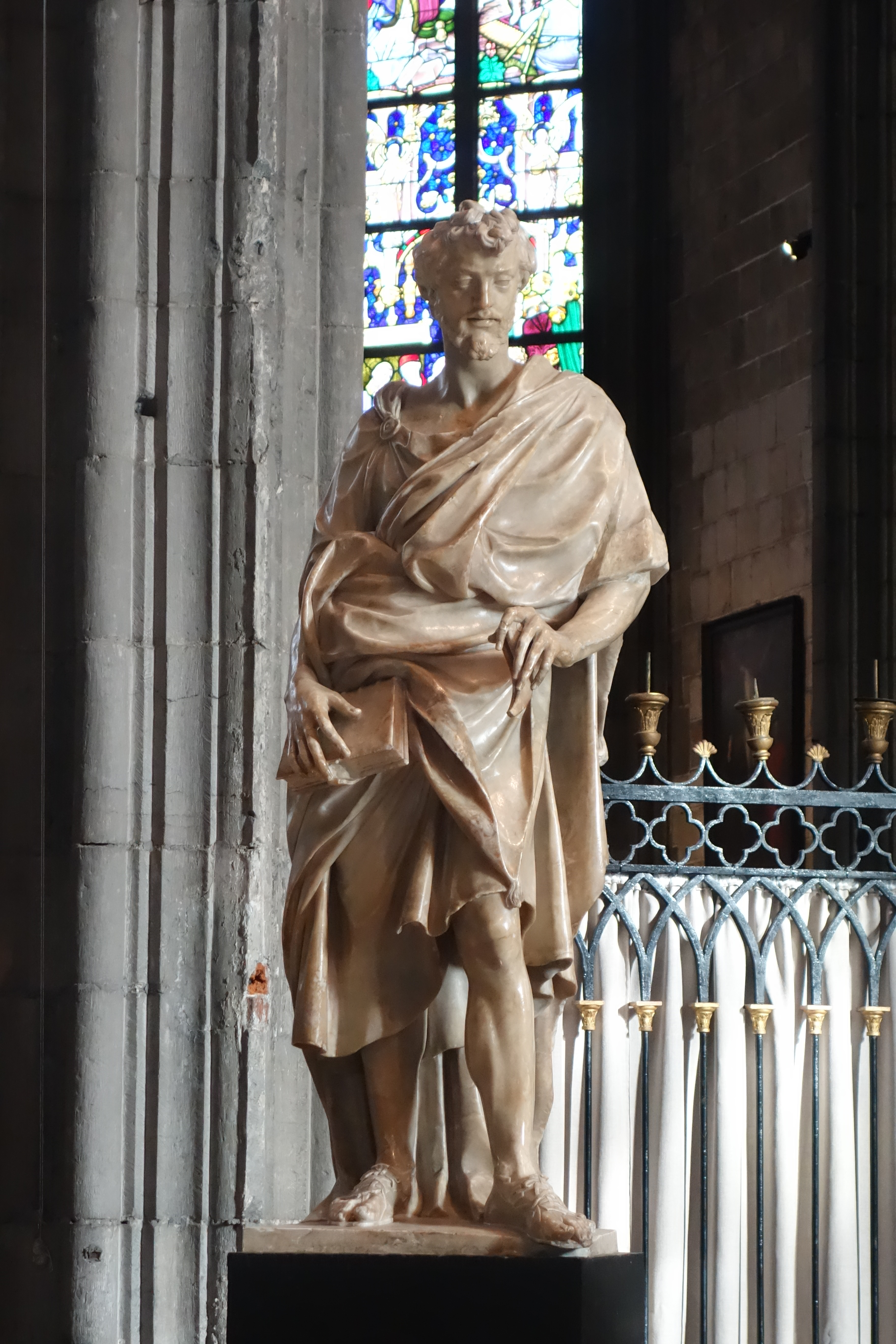
Artwork by Jacques du Broeuq.

In 1507 Margaret of Austria became governor of the Netherlands on behalf of her nephew Charles I, creating a humanist court in Mechelen. Margaret was a great collector of art and took into her service all kinds of artists, among them the sculptor Conrad Meit, born in Worms, who worked in the art of portraiture and small boxwood or bronze statuettes. Marguerite commissioned him to make the figures of her husband Philibert the Handsome, that of her mother Mary of Burgundy, and her own for the church of Brou of Bourg-en-Bresse.

The Belgian Herman Glosencamps built the decorative sculptures of the chimney of the Town Hall of Bruges. In Utrecht there are several statues by the sculptor Uries and Kéyser, in which Renaissance naturalism can be seen in the anatomical details and in the folds of the vestments, with full acceptance of the new style in the second half of the sixteenth century.

Jacques du Broeuq, master of John of Bologna, was appointed architect and court sculptor by Mary of Austria, daughter of Charles I of Spain, for whom he carried out numerous works, among them a set of sculptures in alabaster for the choir of Sainte-Waudru de Mons. His reliefs are close to contemporary Italian sculptors, and classicist features can be seen in the folds of their clothes, in the style of ancient statuary. In the larger reliefs such as that of the Resurrection, the figures are shown with elongated silhouettes, almost rounded and very pronounced.

The work of the sculptor and architect Cornelius Floris de Vriendt was manifested with great resemblance to the Italian style in the façade of the Antwerp town hall, in the tombs of the kings of Denmark and the dukes of Prussia in Königsberg, and in the decoration of the choir of the cathedral of Our Lady of Tournai, made with a great resemblance to the style of Andrea Sansovino.

== English sculpture ==
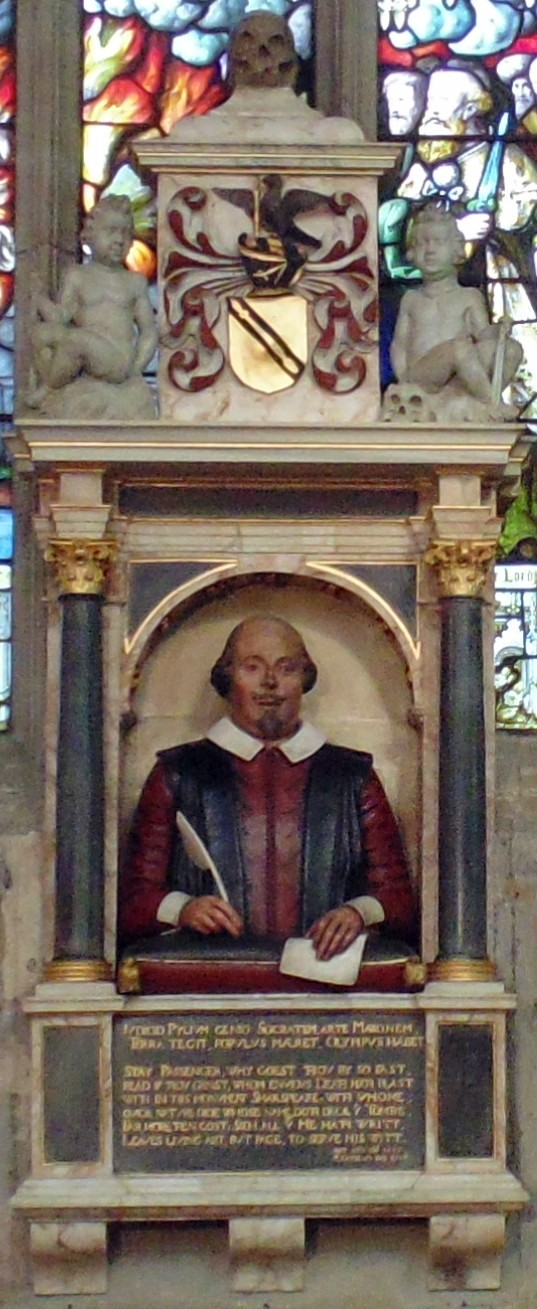
Shakespeare's funerary monument at Holy Trinity Church, Stratford, by Gerard Johnson.

English sculpture of the 16th century is derived from Italian sculpture, the most notable artists working in England being from the latter country. The monarchs, in order to encourage artistic life, exercised a very important role in developing this artistic movement. Among the first and principal Italian sculptors was Pietro Torrigiano, to whom we owe the tomb of Henry VII and Elizabeth of York. It is made of marble and gilded bronze, with the recumbent figures of the monarchs and at each corner of the tomb angels holding coats of arms; it is in a chapel of Westminster Abbey in London. In 1511 he sculpted the tomb of Margaret Beaufort, mother of Henry VII. From 1516 dates the tomb of the royal archivist, John Young, whom he also represented in a bust preserved in the National Portrait Gallery in London.

He was also commissioned by Henry VIII for his own tomb and that of his wife Catherine of Aragon in 1518. Despite the sculptor's trip to Italy to hire assistants, the reasons why he did not complete the work are unknown and he left the English court to settle in Spain in 1525. This tomb was finally made between 1524 and 1528 by the Italian sculptor Benedetto da Rovezzano.

With the implementation of the Protestant Reformation, religious sculpture was suppressed in England, as well as contact with anything that could come from Italy because it was identified as a way of papal influence. Only in the superb pantheons and in commemorative statues of characters had since then some life in plastic arts, such as the one made by the Englishman Richard Parker for the tomb of the Earl of Rutland (1543) in Bottesford.

The Italian influence was replaced by the French and by the arrival of Flemish artists, among them Gerard Johnson (also called Garret Jansen), who made the tomb of the Earl of Southampton in Titchfield and the funerary monument in honor of William Shakespeare in Stratford.

== Portuguese sculpture ==
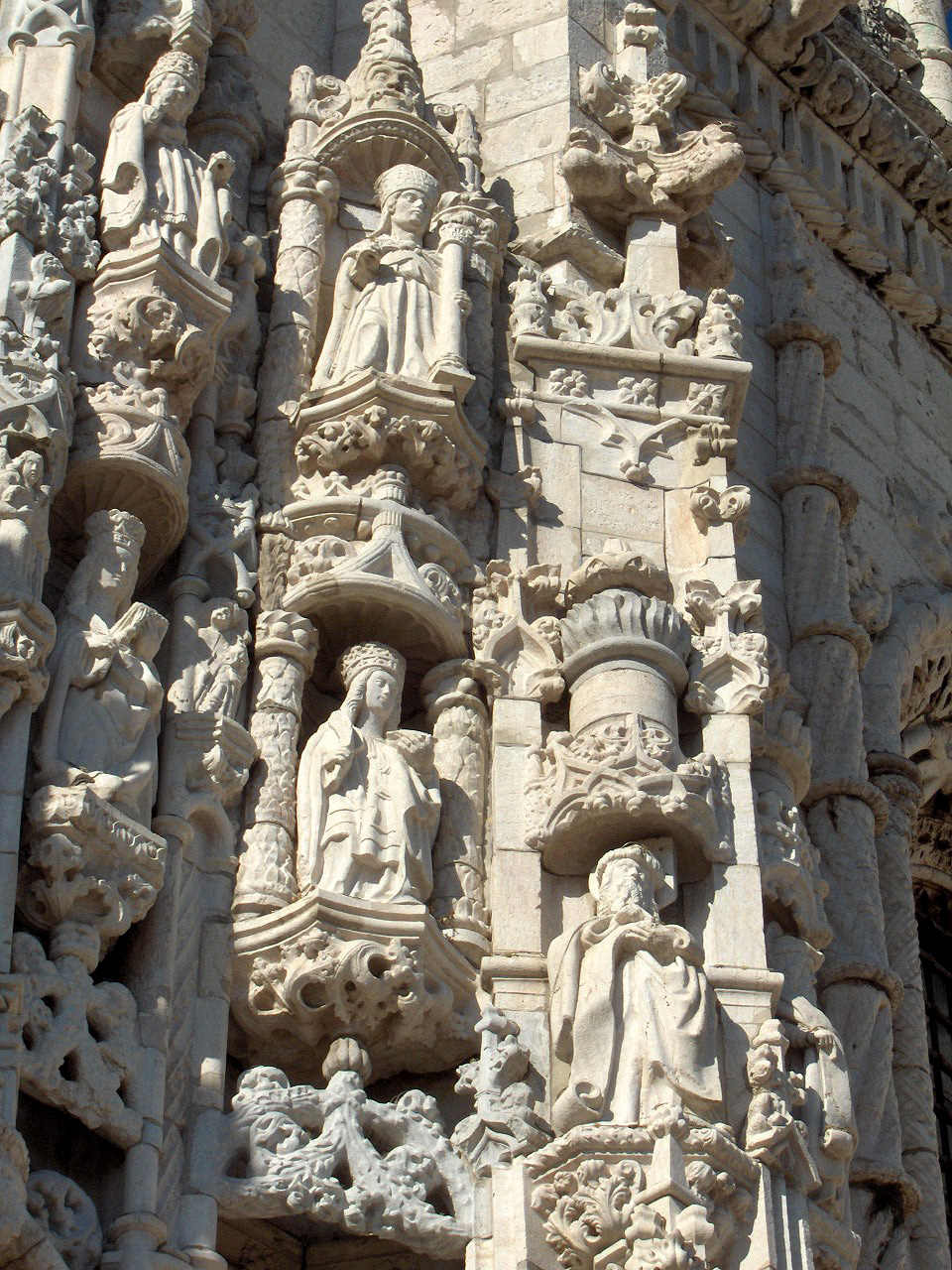
Portico of the Jerónimos Monastery in Belém by Nicolás Chanterenne.

At the end of the 15th century, Andrea Sansovino went to work for King John II of Portugal; there seems to have been a feeling that the Italians, with their almost exclusive monopoly on ancient art, also possessed the gift of what was right in art.

A focus of humanism on the model of the Italian courts was created around the court of John III. The Renaissance imposed itself in the cities of Coimbra, Tomar and Évora with such force that in this region of Alentejo it was very difficult for the later implantation of the Baroque. Portuguese sculpture was also Italianist in its first Renaissance, its main works being three beautiful reliefs in the cloister of the church of Santa Cruz in Coimbra, carved by Portuguese artists:

- Christ before Pilate
- Passage of the cross on his shoulders
- Mass of St. Gregory

Coming from France, the artist Nicolas Chanterenne made in 1515 the royal sepulchres for this church in Coimbra. In 1517 he was commissioned the central portico of the Jerónimos Monastery in Belém and the praying figures of King Manuel and Queen Maria; among the many works of this sculptor is the alabaster altarpiece of the Pena Palace for the city of Sintra. Chanterenne also practiced the art of portraiture with busts of great realism.

Two other French sculptors were also in Coimbra: Juan de Ruan and Felipe Duarte or Orarte, who came from Toledo and who was hired to make the group of The Supper, which was completed in 1534 with an extraordinary realism in agitated and impetuous attitudes. The group is currently preserved in the Museum of the city of Coimbra. Rouén worked on an altarpiece for the chapel of the Sacrament in the cathedral of this city; also noteworthy is the pulpit he made for the monastery of Santa Cruz. This artist set up an important workshop, where a great number of works were sculpted. In the middle of this century the Spanish influence could be appreciated in several works of the monastery of Belém, as in a wooden Crucified whose style is similar to that of the circle of Diego de Siloé.

== Hispano-American Sculpture ==
In general, Hispano-American Renaissance sculpture was achieved, thanks in large part, to the religious orders and their teaching work together with the availability of models of works brought from Spain, from where in many occasions the iconography of the images was copied, especially the iconography of the images.

In Ecuador, it was precisely the Franciscan missionaries of Flemish origin Pedro Gosseal and Jodoco Ricke who founded the first school in the convent of San Francisco in Quito, teaching knowledge in the art of architecture and carving, both in stone and wood, as well as religion and letters. The local artists achieved good interpretations mixed with motifs of their tradition with the ingenuity of the faces of the images as well as the polychrome with more primary colors and much more striking, where it can be seen in the altarpieces that were built during the fifteenth century in Mexico, as well as in the decoration used in the baptismal fonts and in the crosses of the conventual courtyards.

A relevant sculptor is the Guatemalan Quirio Cataño, who was the author, among other images, of the Black Christ of Esquipulas in 1594.

== Bibliography ==
- DDAA (2004). Historia del Arte Espasa (in Spanish). Espasa-Calpe. ISBN 84-670-1323-0.
- DDAA (1984). Historia Universal del Arte (in Spanish). Vol. 5. Madrid: Sarpe. ISBN 84-7291-593-X.
- Alcolea Gil, Santiago (1988). Historia Universal del Arte: Renacimiento (II) y Manierismo (in Spanish). Barcelona: Editorial Planeta. ISBN 84-320-8906-0.
- Angulo Íñiguez, Diego (1982). Historia del Arte (in Spanish). Vol. II. Madrid. ISBN 84-400-8723-3.
- Azcárate, José María de (1981). Historia del Arte en cuadros esquemáticos (in Spanish). Editorial E.P.E.S.A. ISBN 84-7067-099-9.
- Bozal, Valeriano (1983). Historia del Arte: La escultura del Renacimiento en Italia (in Spanish). Barcelona: Carroggio. ISBN 84-7254-313-7.
- Castelfranchi Vegas, Liana (1997). El arte en el Renacimiento (in Spanish). Barcelona: M. Moleiro. ISBN 84-88526-26-1.
- Ceysson, Bernard (1996). La Escultura: Siglos XV-XVI. El Renacimiento (in Spanish). Barcelona: Carroggio. ISBN 84-7254-245-9.
- Hernández Perera, Jesús (1988). Historia Universal del Arte: El Cinquecento italiano (in Spanish). Barcelona: Planeta. ISBN 84-320-8906-0.
- Hodson, Rupert (2000). Miguel Ángel, escultor (in Spanish). Florència: Faenza. ISBN 88-8138-044-7.
- Kahsnitz, Rainer (2006). Carved Altarpieces, Masterpieces of the late ghotihc. London: Thames & Hudson Ltd. ISBN 978-0-500-51298-2.
- Morante López, Felisa; Ruiz Zapata, Ana María (1994). Análisis y comentario de la obra de arte. Estudio de obras de pintura, arquitectura y escultura (in Spanish). Iniciación universitaria Edinumen. ISBN 84-85789-72-5.
- Panofsky, Irvin. Tomb Sculpture. London: Harry Abrams, 1964. ISBN 0-8109-3870-7
- Sureda, Joan (1988). Historia Universal del Arte: El Renacimiento I (in Spanish). Barcelona: Planeta. ISBN 84-320-8905-2.
