= Terribilità =

Quality ascribed to Michelangelo's art

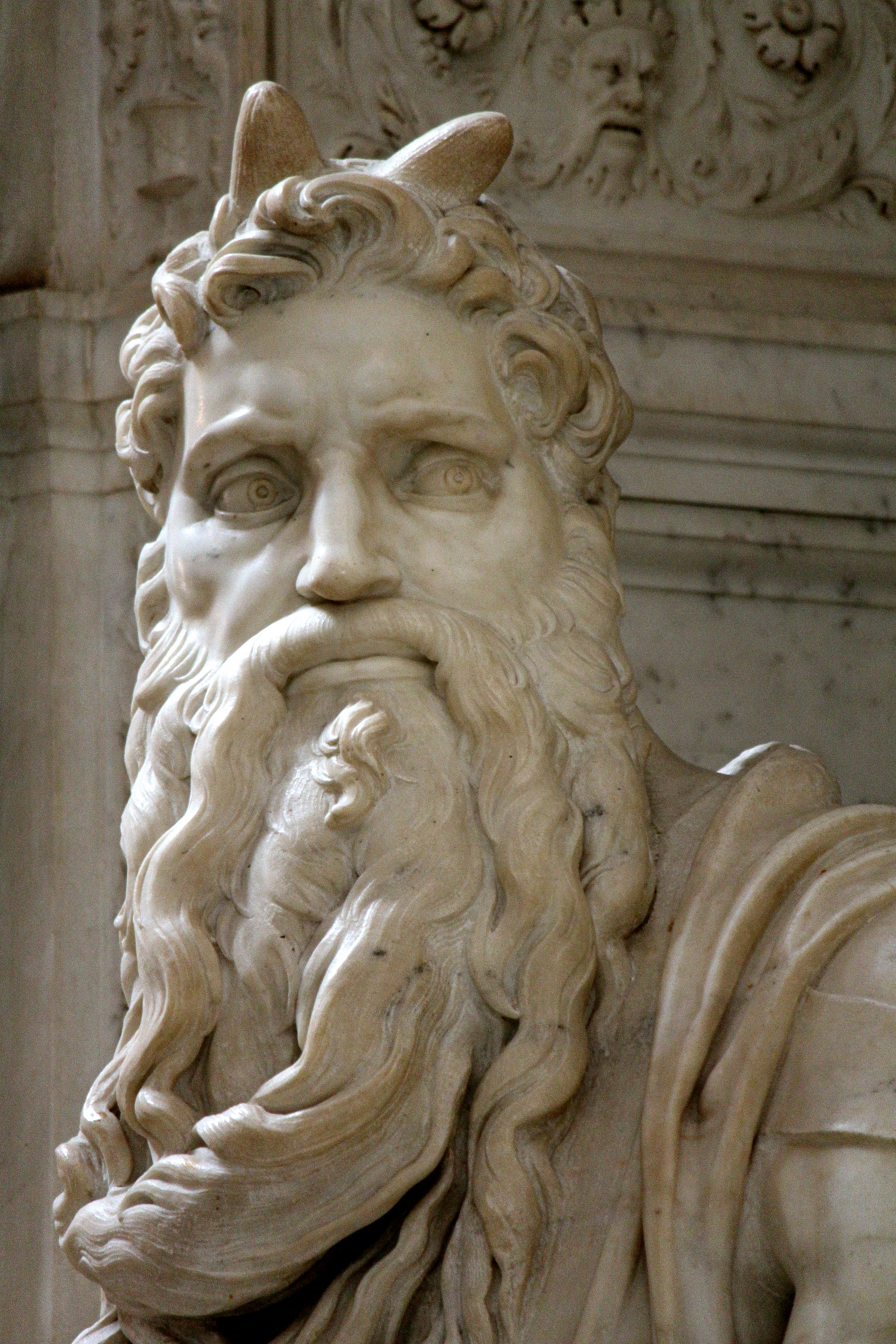
Moses by Michelangelo

Terribilità, the modern Italian spelling, or terribiltà, as Michelangelo's 16th century contemporaries tended to spell it, is a quality ascribed to his art that provokes terror, awe, or a sense of the sublime in the viewer. It is perhaps especially applied to his sculptures, such as his figures of David or in Moses.

Pope Julius II was apparently the first to describe Michelangelo as a uomo terribile ("terror-inducing man"), apparently describing his difficult character as much as his art. This terribilità also references the neoplatonics of humanists such as Marsilio Ficino, who had known Michelangelo in his youth.

Michelangelo's friend and collaborator Sebastiano del Piombo reported in a letter to him of 15 October 1520 on a private audience with Pope Leo X. After praising Michelangelo's work, the pope continued "But he is terribile, as you see; one cannot deal with him". Sebastiano responded "that your terribile character did not harm anyone, and that you appear terribile for love of the great works you carry out."

== Bibliography ==
- Hodson, Rupert (2000). Miguel Ángel, escultor. Brand. ISBN 978-84-95481-02-3.
- Martín González, Juan José (1974). Juan de Juni: vida y obra. Dirección General de Bellas Artes, Ministerio de Educacíon y Ciencia, [Patronato Nacional de Museos. ISBN 978-84-369-0335-5.
