= Ossuary =

Container for dead remains

Ossuaries

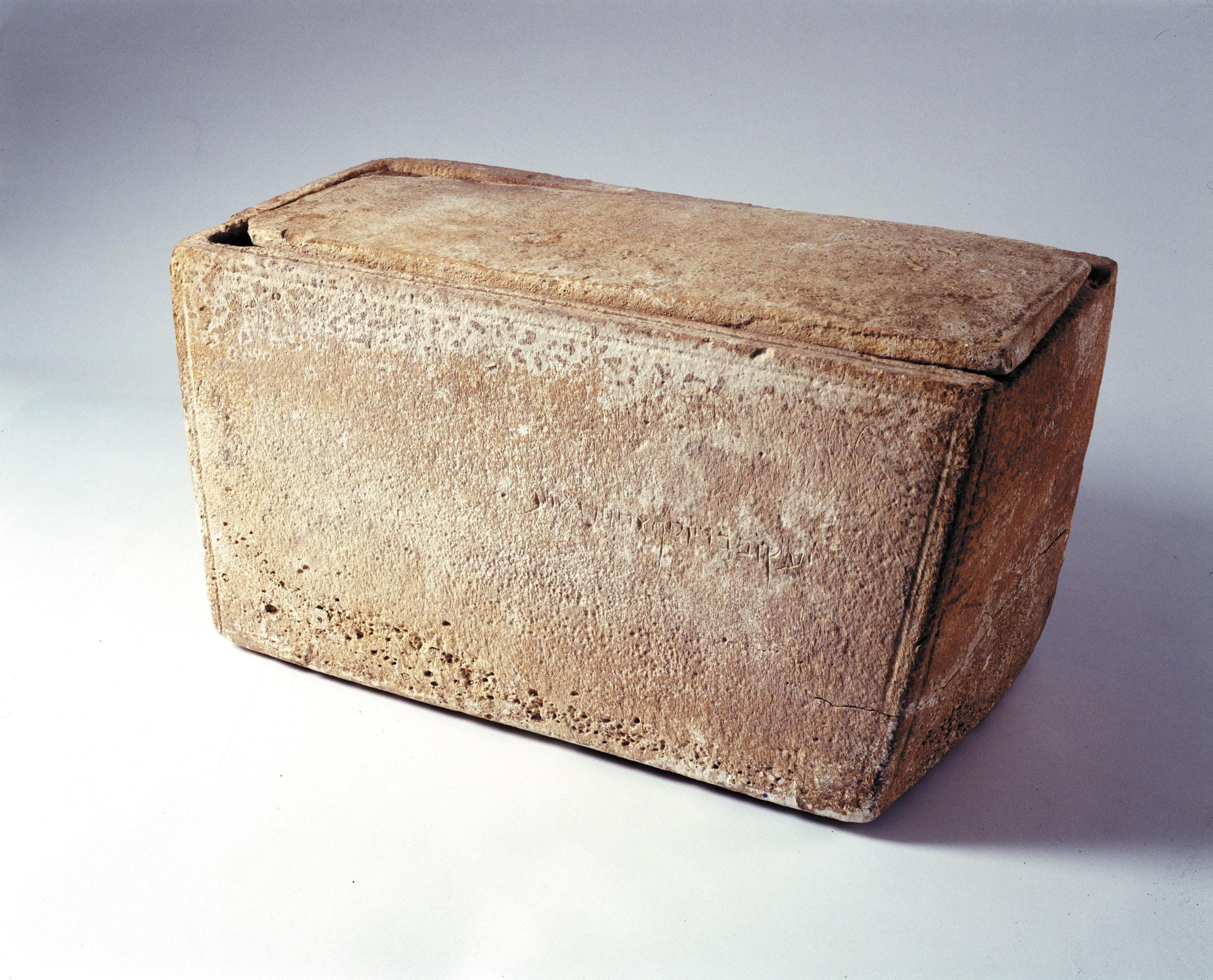
The limestone James Ossuary from the 1st century

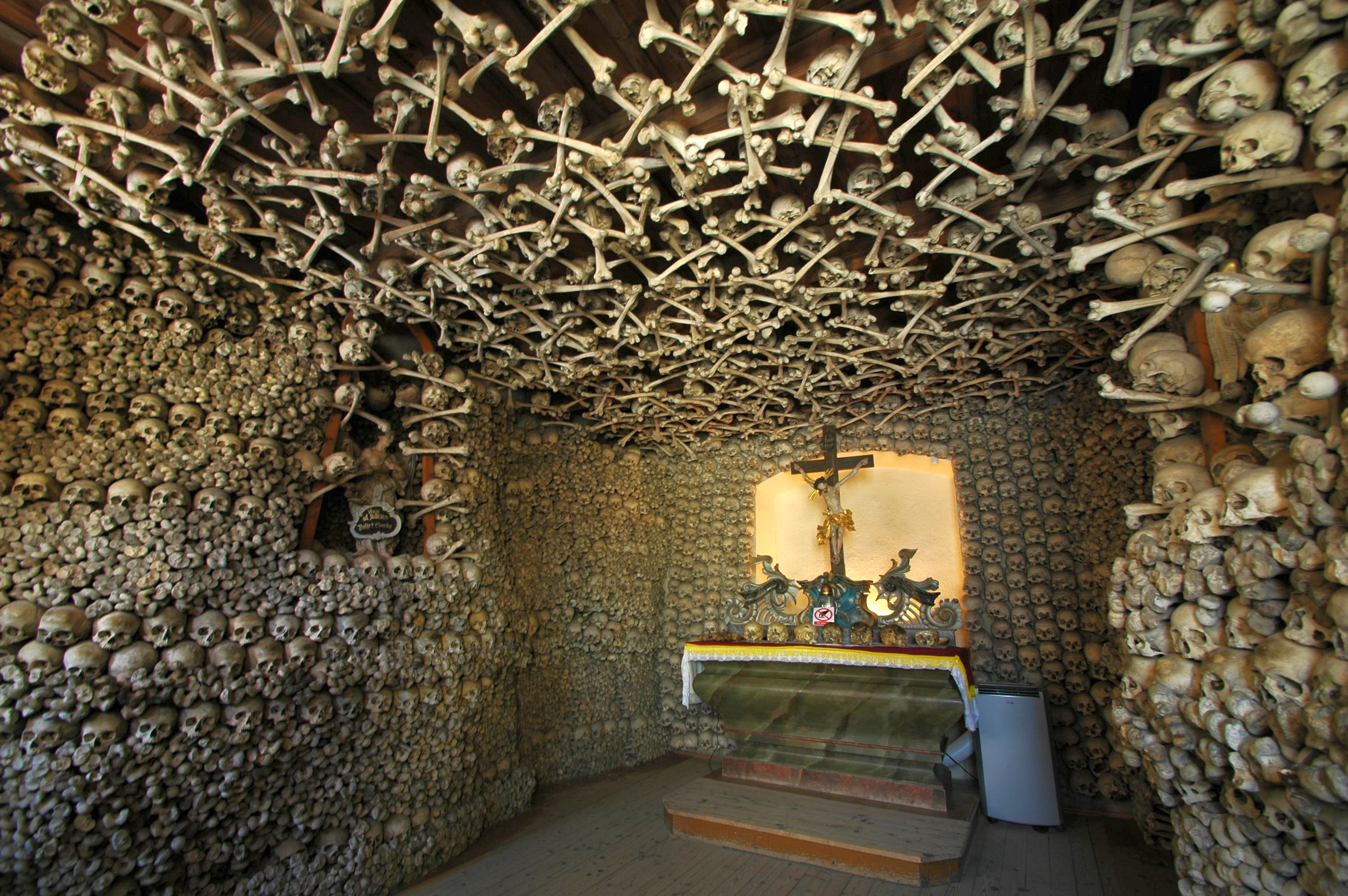
Human remains on the walls and ceiling of Skull Chapel, Poland

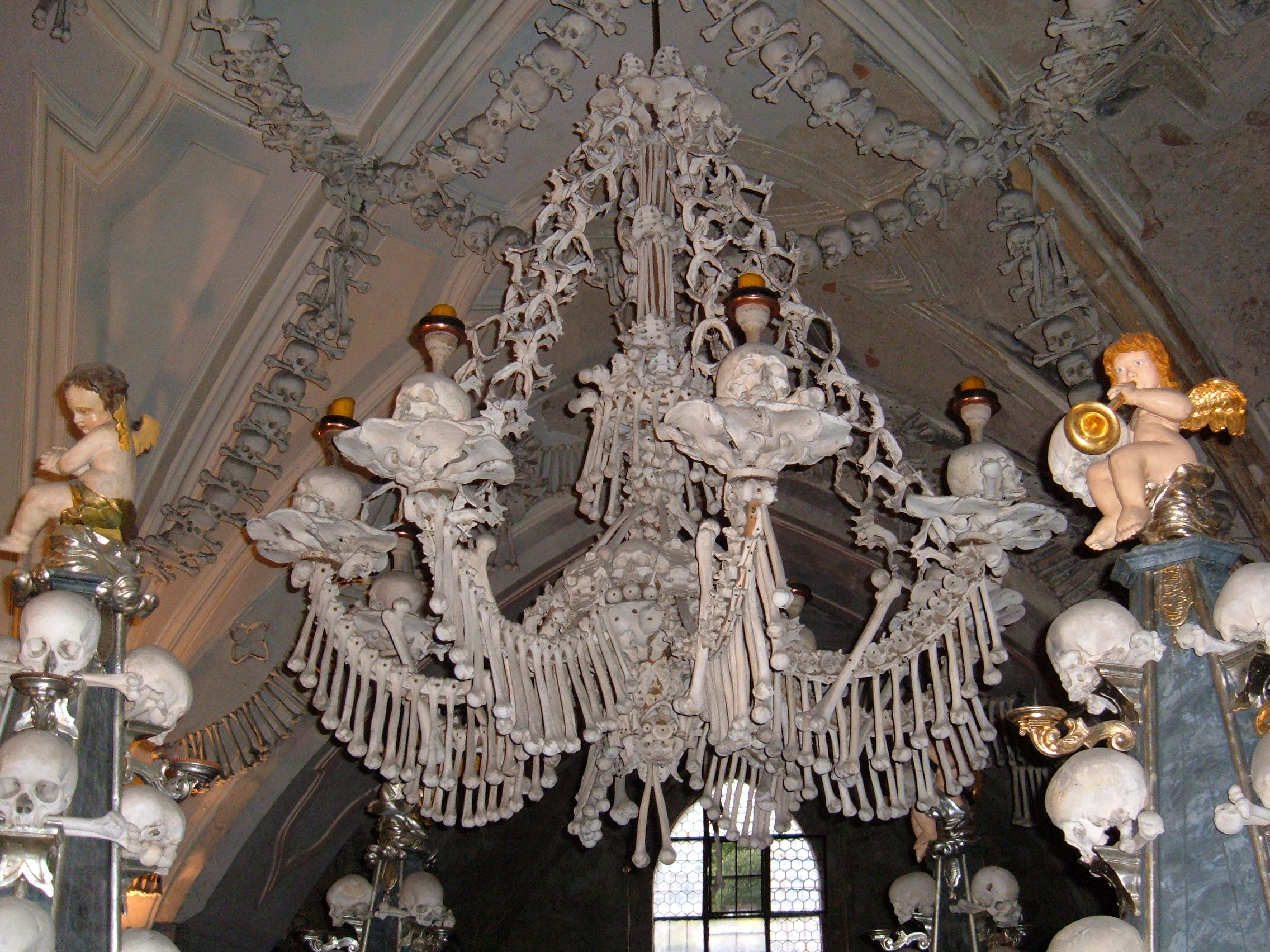
A chandelier made of bones in Sedlec Ossuary, Czech Republic

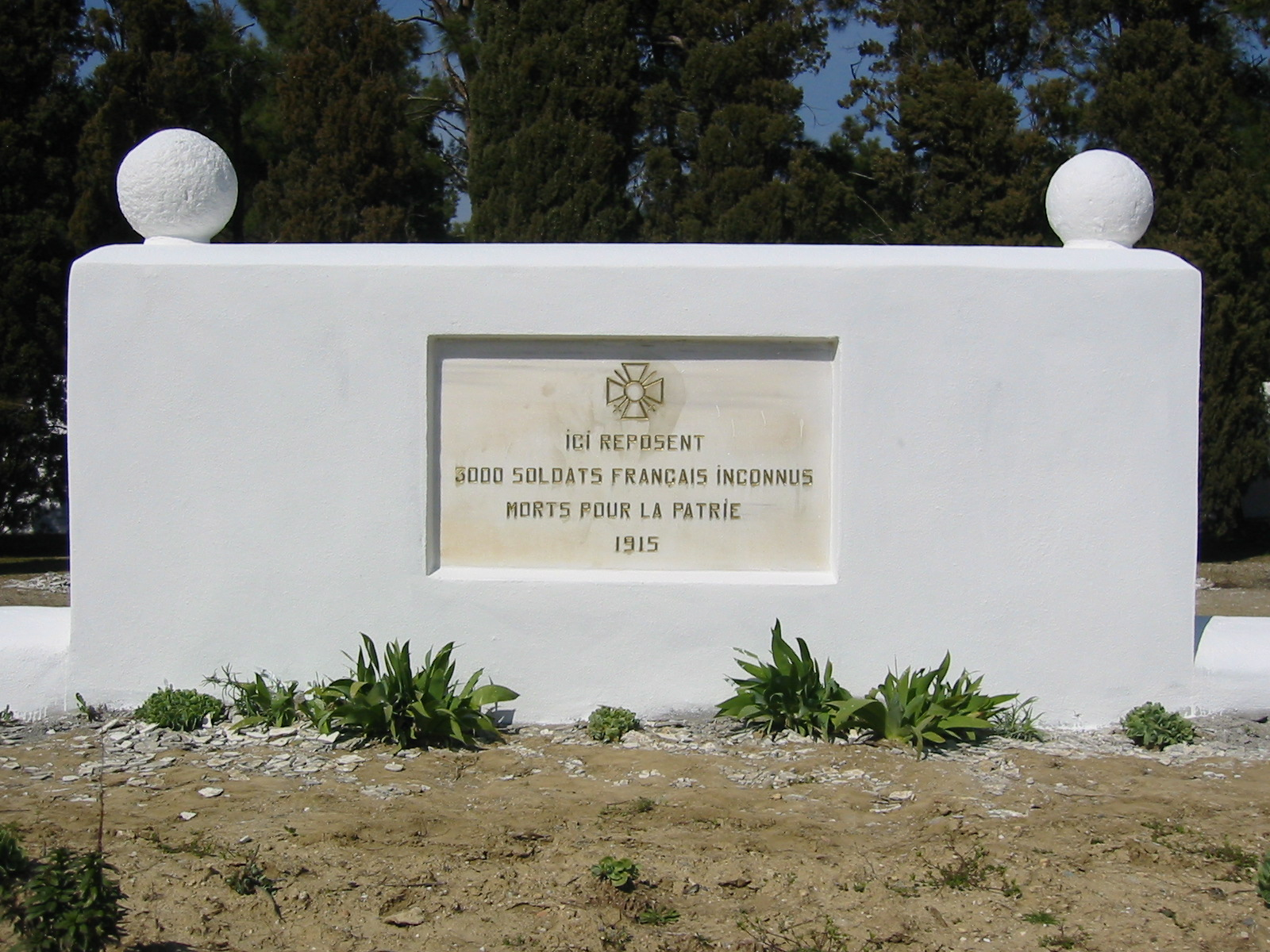
Ossuary at the Gallipoli battlefield; contains the remains of French soldiers

An ossuary is a chest, box, building, well, or site made to serve as the final resting place of human skeletal remains. They are frequently used where burial space is scarce. A body is first buried in a temporary grave, then after some years the skeletal remains are removed and placed in an ossuary ("os" is "bone" in Latin). The greatly reduced space taken up by an ossuary means that it is possible to store the remains of many more people in a single tomb than possible in coffins. The practice is sometimes known as grave recycling.

== Persian ossuaries ==
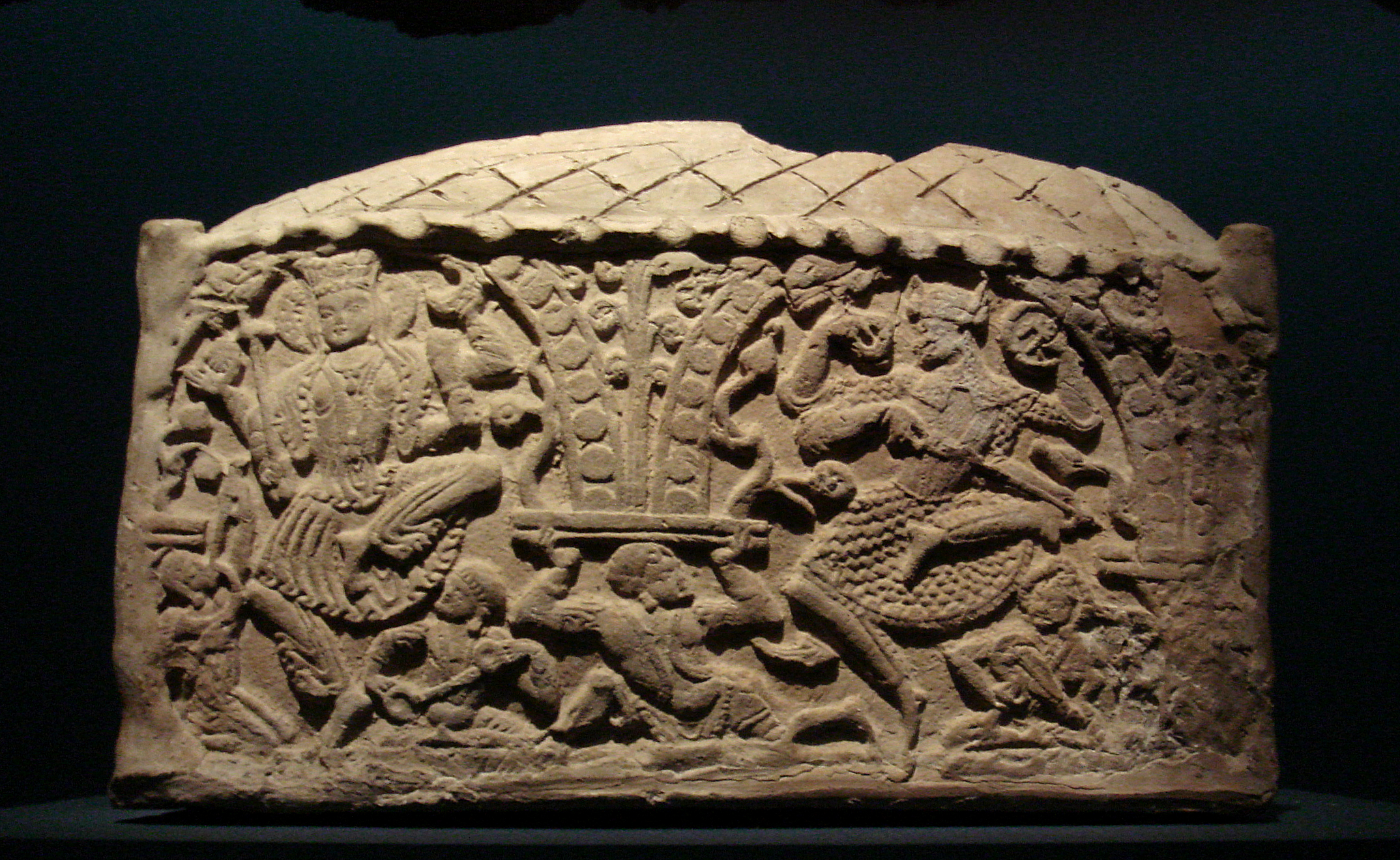
A Zoroastrian ossuary, 7–8th century CE, Hirman Tepe, Uzbekistan

In Persia, the Zoroastrians used a deep well for this function from the earliest times (c. 3,000 years ago) and called it astudan (literally, "the place for the bones"). There are many rituals and regulations in the Zoroastrian faith concerning the astudans.

== Jewish ossuaries ==
During the Second Temple period, Jewish burial customs were varied, differing based on class and belief. For the wealthy, one option available included primary burials in burial caves, followed by secondary burials in ossuaries. These bone boxes were placed in smaller niches of the burial caves, on the benches used for the desiccation of the corpse, or even on the floor. These ossuaries are almost exclusively made of limestone, roughly 40% of which are decorated with intricate geometrical patterns. Many ossuaries, plain or decorated, feature inscriptions identifying the deceased. These inscriptions are the chief scholarly source for identifying naming conventions in this region during this period.

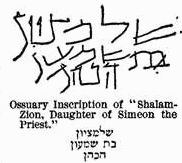
Jewish ossuary inscription from Second Temple period

Among the best-known Jewish ossuaries of this period are: an ossuary inscribed 'Simon the Temple builder' in the collection of the Israel Museum; one inscribed 'Yehohanan ben Hagkol' that contained an iron nail in a heel bone suggesting crucifixion; another, (owned by André Lemaire), inscribed 'James son of Joseph, brother of Jesus', the authenticity of which has been debated by scholars; and ten ossuaries recovered from the Talpiot Tomb in 1980, several of which are reported to have names recorded in the New Testament.

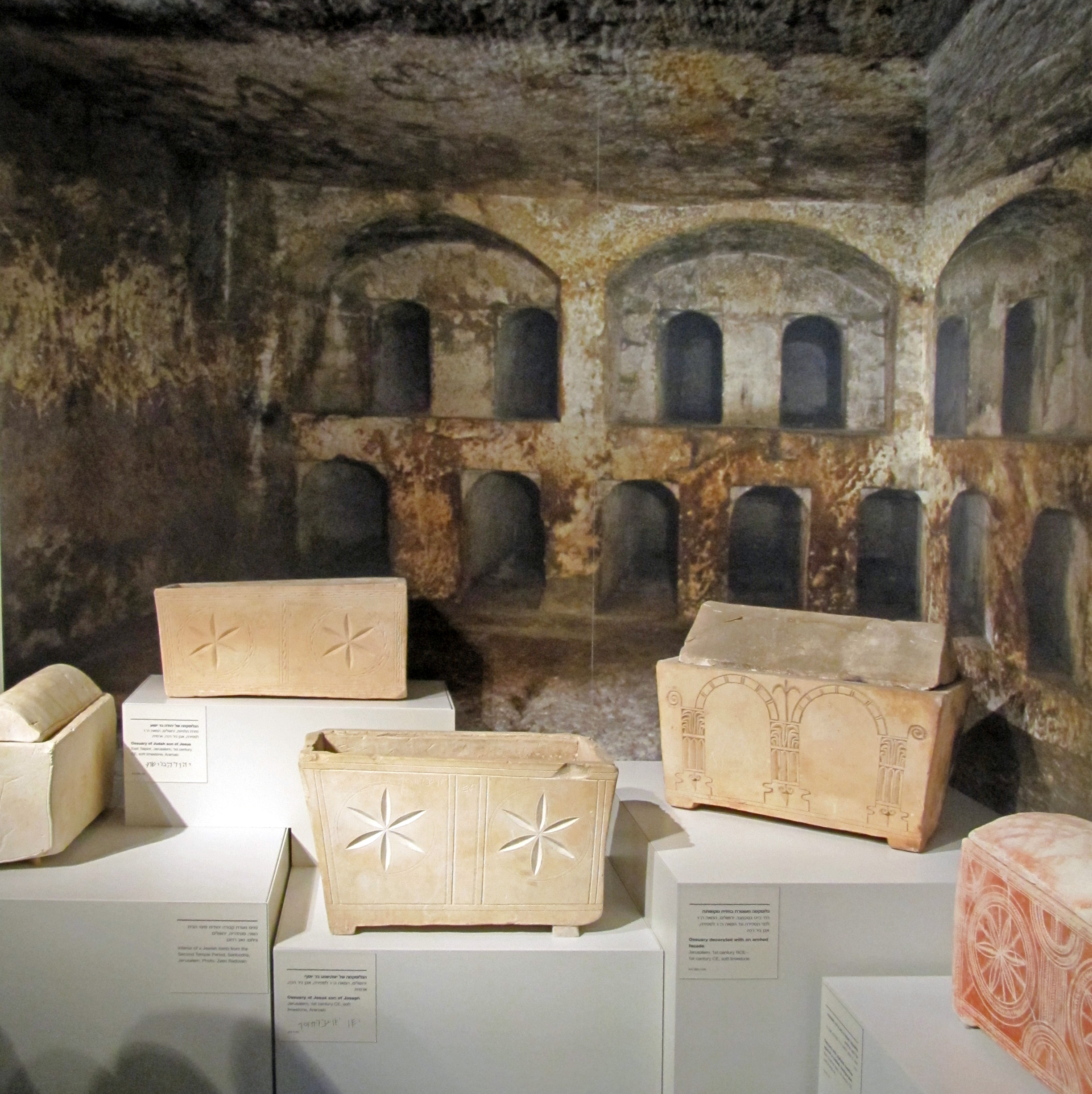
Ossuaries from the Talpiot Tomb, displayed at the Israel Museum

Geographically, ossuaries are almost exclusively associated with tombs in and around Jerusalem; however, caches of contemporaneous ossuaries have been discovered in Jericho.

There is ongoing scholarly disagreement as to the function and origin of ossuary burial. Some argue that this form of burial was born out of a theological shift in ideas about purity. Specifically, in the Mishnah and Talmud, Jewish sages from the period are depicted debating the methods and beliefs around ossuary burial. The perspectives they espouse are connected to the Pharisaic tradition; as such, it is speculated that ossuaries were developed by elite members of the Pharisaic religious school before spreading to other sects.

Others argue that material conditions of the elite have more influence on ossuaries use and form during this period. An increase in wealth among the urban elite in Jerusalem and Jericho, coupled with a building boom that created a surplus of stonemasons, allowed for new kinds of burial to evolve. It has been observed that ossuaries follow philosophically with Greco-Roman ideas of individuality in death and physically with Hellenistic forms of chest burial; as such, ossuaries may be an elite imitation of imperial burial modes that did not violate Jewish cultural norms.

The custom of secondary burial in ossuaries, on a whole, did not persist among Jews past the Second Temple period nor appear to exist widely among Jews outside the Land of Israel. There are, of course, exceptions to every trend: after the destruction of the Second Temple, poor imitations of ossuaries made of clay were created in Galilee; the last stone ossuaries are found in the Beth She'arim necropolis and date from the late third century CE; and at least one ossuary dating from the Second Temple period has been discovered in Alexandria.

== In Christianity ==
=== Roman Catholic ossuaries ===
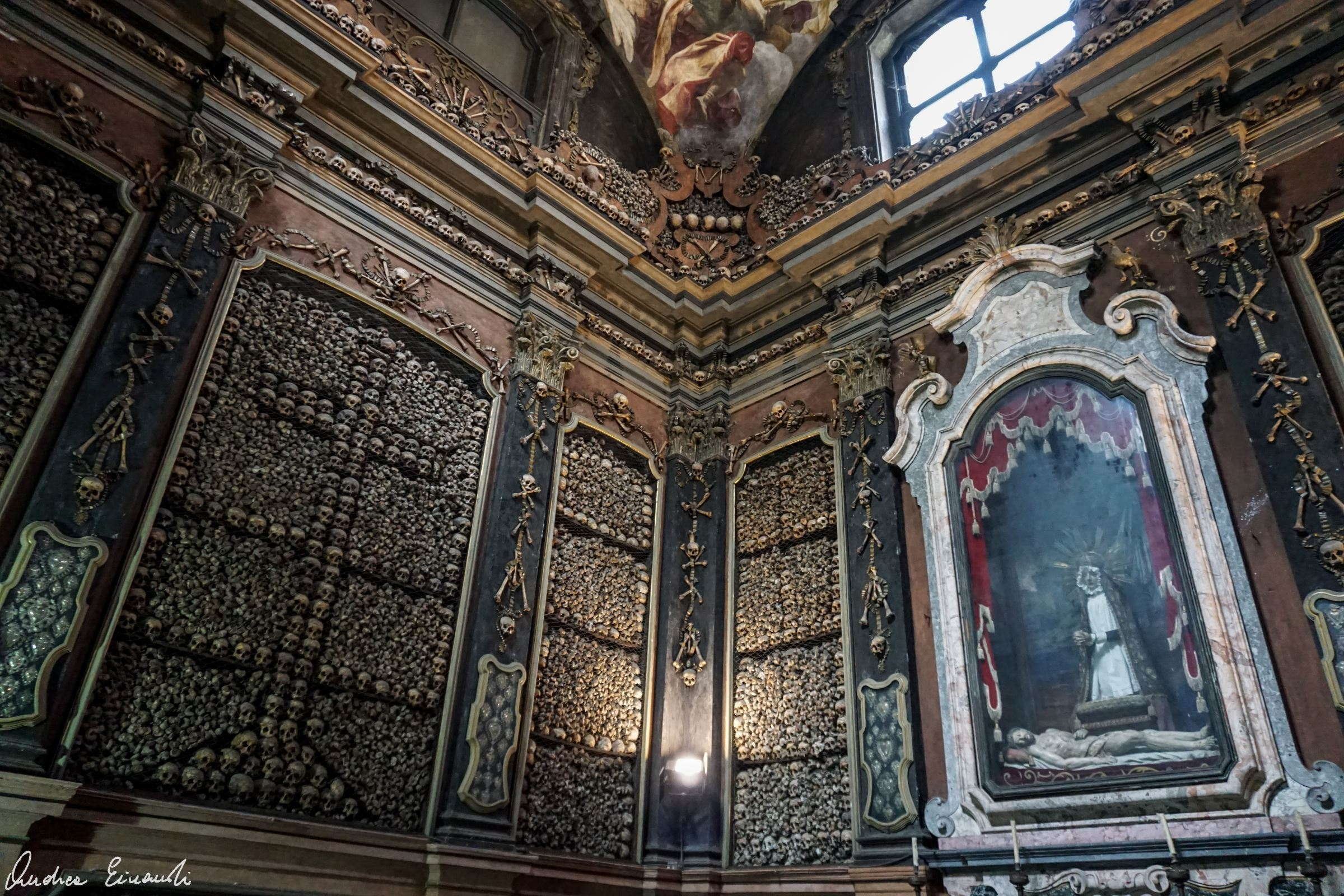
The ossuary of San Bernardino alle Ossa in Milan.

Many examples of ossuaries are found within Europe, including the Santa Maria della Concezione dei Cappuccini in Rome, Italy; the Martyrs of Otranto in south Italy; the Fontanelle cemetery and Purgatorio ad Arco in Naples, Italy; the San Bernardino alle Ossa in Milan, Italy; the Brno Ossuary and the Sedlec Ossuary in the Czech Republic; the Czermna Skull Chapel in Poland; and the Capela dos Ossos ("Chapel of Bones") in Évora, Portugal. The village of Wamba in the province of Valladolid, Spain, has an impressive ossuary of over a thousand skulls inside the local church, dating from between the 12th and 18th centuries. A more recent example is the Douaumont ossuary in France, which contains the remains of more than 130,000 French and German soldiers that fell at the Battle of Verdun during World War I. The Catacombs of Paris represents another famous ossuary.

The catacombs beneath the Monastery of San Francisco in Lima, Peru also contain an ossuary.

==== Largest ossuary ====
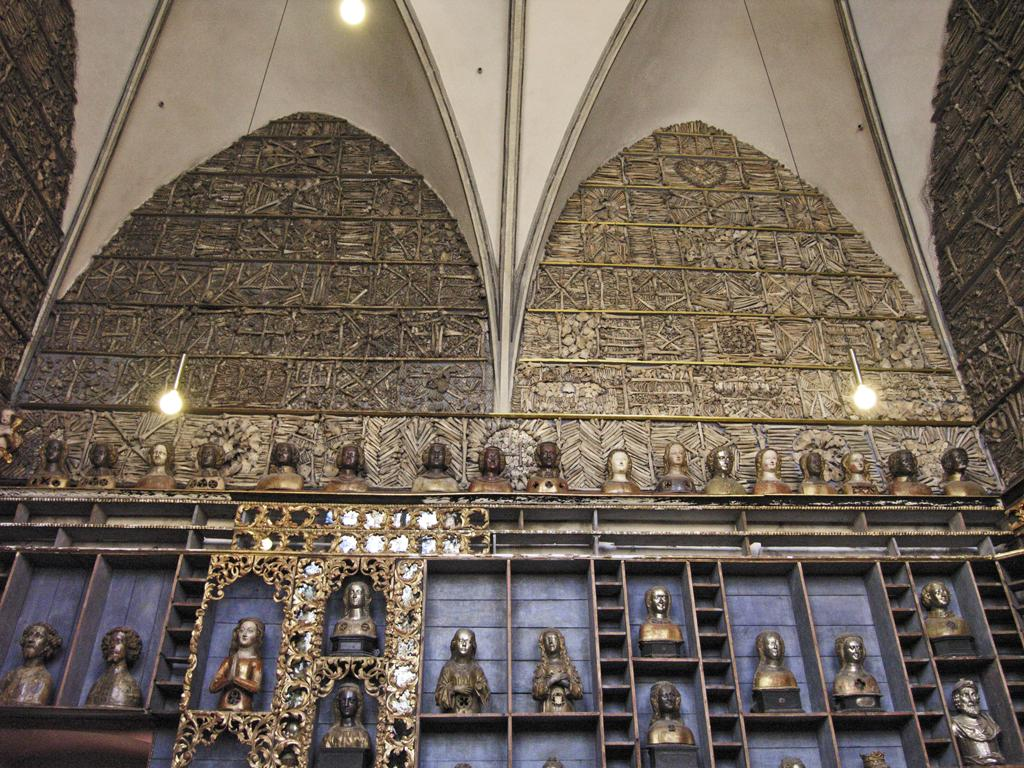
The Ursulakammer in the Basilica of St. Ursula in Cologne, where in the 17th century the largest mosaic in human bones ever was created, that covers the four walls of the room.

The skeletal remains of six million people lie, neatly arranged, in catacombs (also known as ossuaries or charnel houses) beneath the streets of Paris, France. The city has an estimated 300 kilometres (190 mi) of tunnels and pathways, of which 11,000 square metres (2.7 acres) are packed tightly with the bones of those re-interred from the city's overflowing cemeteries in the late 1700s.

=== Eastern Orthodox ossuaries ===
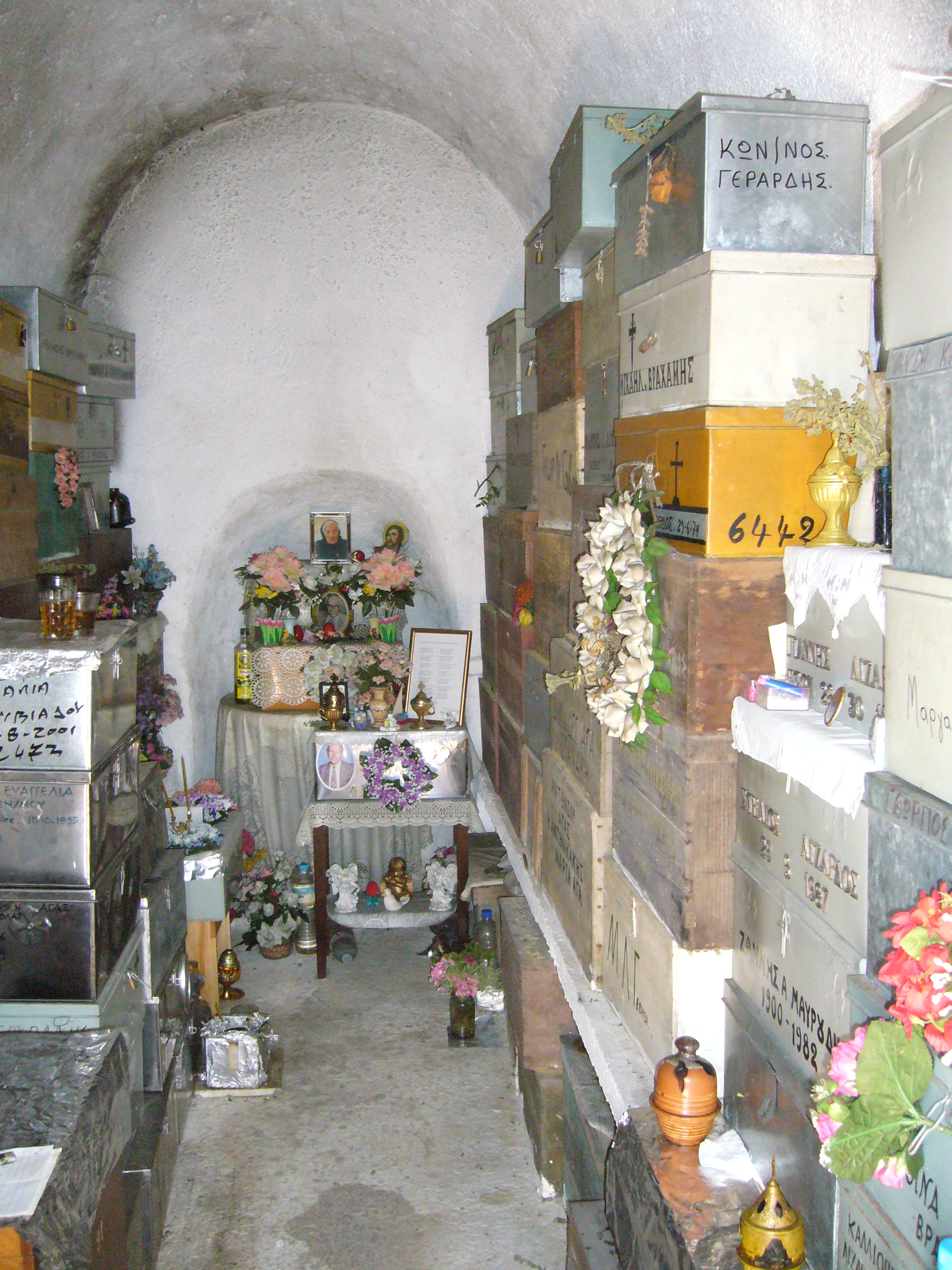
Contemporary Greek ossuaries made of wood and metal.

The use of ossuaries is a longstanding tradition in the Eastern Orthodox Church. The remains of an Orthodox Christian are treated with special reverence, in conformity with the biblical teaching that the body of a believer is a "temple of the Holy Spirit", having been sanctified and transfigured by Baptism, Holy Communion and the participation in the mystical life of the Church. In Orthodox monasteries, when one of the brethren dies, his remains are buried (for details, see Christian burial) for one to three years, and then disinterred, cleaned and gathered into the monastery's charnel house. If there is reason to believe that the departed is a saint, the remains may be placed in a reliquary; otherwise the bones are usually mingled together (skulls together in one place, long bones in another, etc.). The remains of an abbot may be placed in a separate ossuary made out of wood or metal.

The use of ossuaries is also found among the laity in the Greek Orthodox Church. The departed will be buried for one to three years and then, often on the anniversary of death, the family will gather with the parish priest and celebrate a parastas (memorial service), after which the remains are disinterred, washed with wine, perfumed, and placed in a small ossuary of wood or metal, inscribed with the name of the departed, and placed in a room, often in or near the church, which is dedicated to this purpose.

== See also ==
- Charnel house
- Columbarium
- Crypt
- Mausoleum
- Sarcophagus
- Tzompantli
