= Baccio Ciarpi =

Italian painter (1574–1654)

The Baptism of Constantine, 1612, San Silvestro, L'Aquila

Baccio Ciarpi (13 September 1574 – 11 November 1654) was an Italian painter of the late-Mannerism and early-Baroque period. He is best known for having mentored briefly Pietro da Cortona.

== Biography ==
Baccio Ciarpi was born in Barga, Tuscany, in 1574. After a brief stay in Florence, where he came into contact with the circle of Santi di Tito, he settled in Rome at a very young age. There, he developed a close relationship with the Florentine artist Andrea Commodi – an influence reflected in his early works, such as the Death of Saint Benedict (before 1610; Rome, Sant'Ambrogio della Massima) and a series of seven canvases for the Roman convent of Santa Lucia in Selci (1614–15). Around 1605, Ciarpi collaborated with Commodi on the cycle of frescoes depicting scenes from the life of Ignatius of Loyola for the Church of the Gesù in Rome. Throughout the 1630s and 1640s, Ciarpi worked in Garfagnana, though he continued to receive significant commissions in Rome, such as the Agony in the Garden (1632) for the church of the Santa Maria della Concezione dei Cappuccini. He died in Rome on 11 November 1654.
