= Liborio Coccetti =

Italian painter (1739–1816)

Liborio Coccetti (23 July 1739 – 18 March 1816) was an Italian painter.

== Biography ==
He was born in Foligno and died in Rome. His works were mainly in fresco and frequently for palaces of the nobility. He was active in Rome and worked for the administration of Pope Pius VI. He painted an altarpiece depicting Madonna and Child with SS Peter and Paul (1775) for the church of San Pietro Apostolo in Corvia, outside Foligno. He also frescoed a St Mark in Glory (ca. 1775) for the vault of San Marco, a church in Sant’Eraclio outside Foligno. He frescoed an Assumption of the Virgin in the chapel, as well as other an Allegory of Music (ca. 1780) in the Palazzo Benedetti di Montevecchio in Spoleto. He also frescoed in the church of San Domenico and Palazzo Morelli (1773-1775) in Spoleto. In Terni he painted a fresco depicting the Glory of the Trinity for the apse of the Duomo of that city. He also painted mythologic frescoes in two rooms of the Palazzo Gazzoli.

Coccetti painted an Assumption on the barrel vault of Santa Maria della Concezione dei Cappuccini in Rome.

== Gallery ==
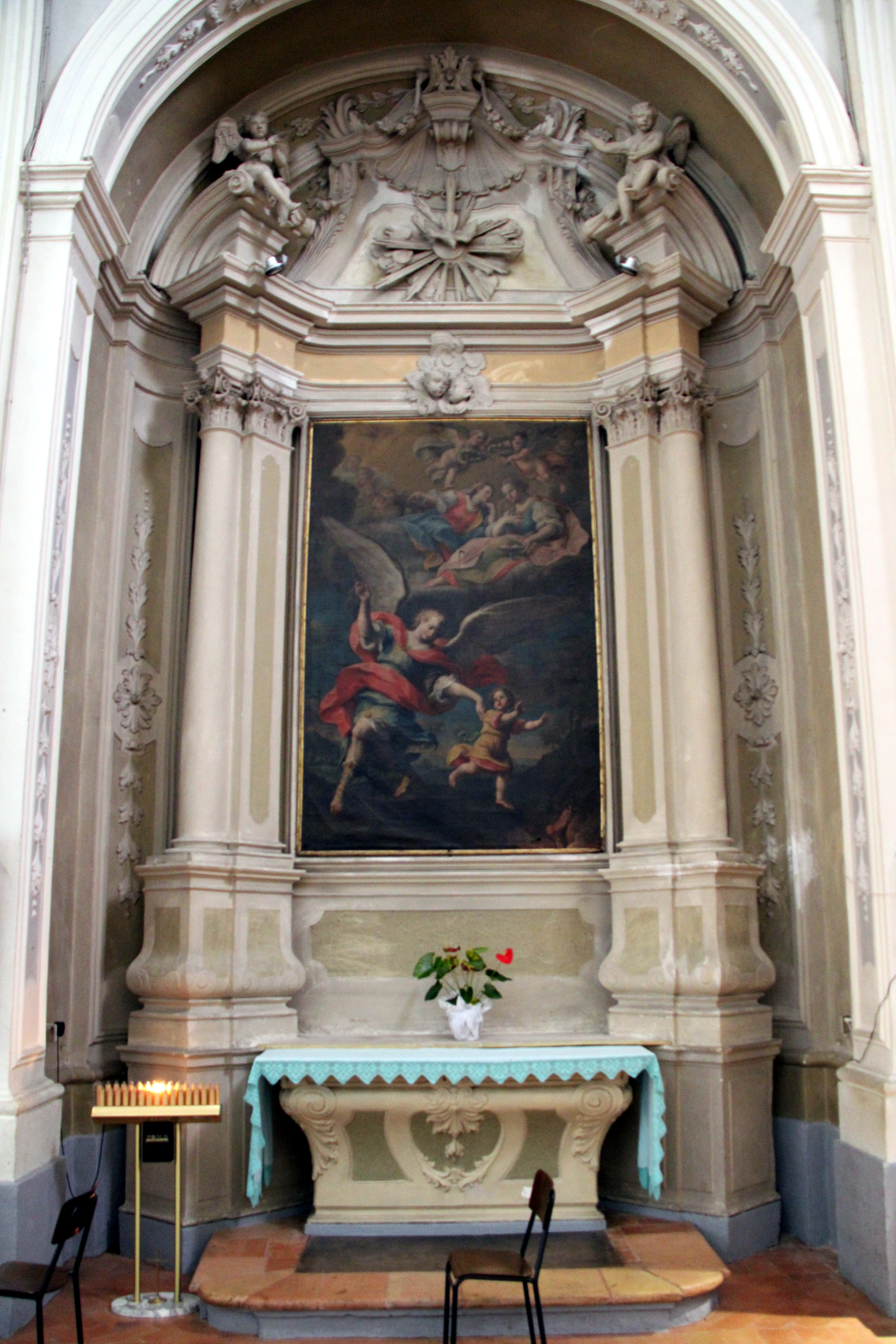
Altar

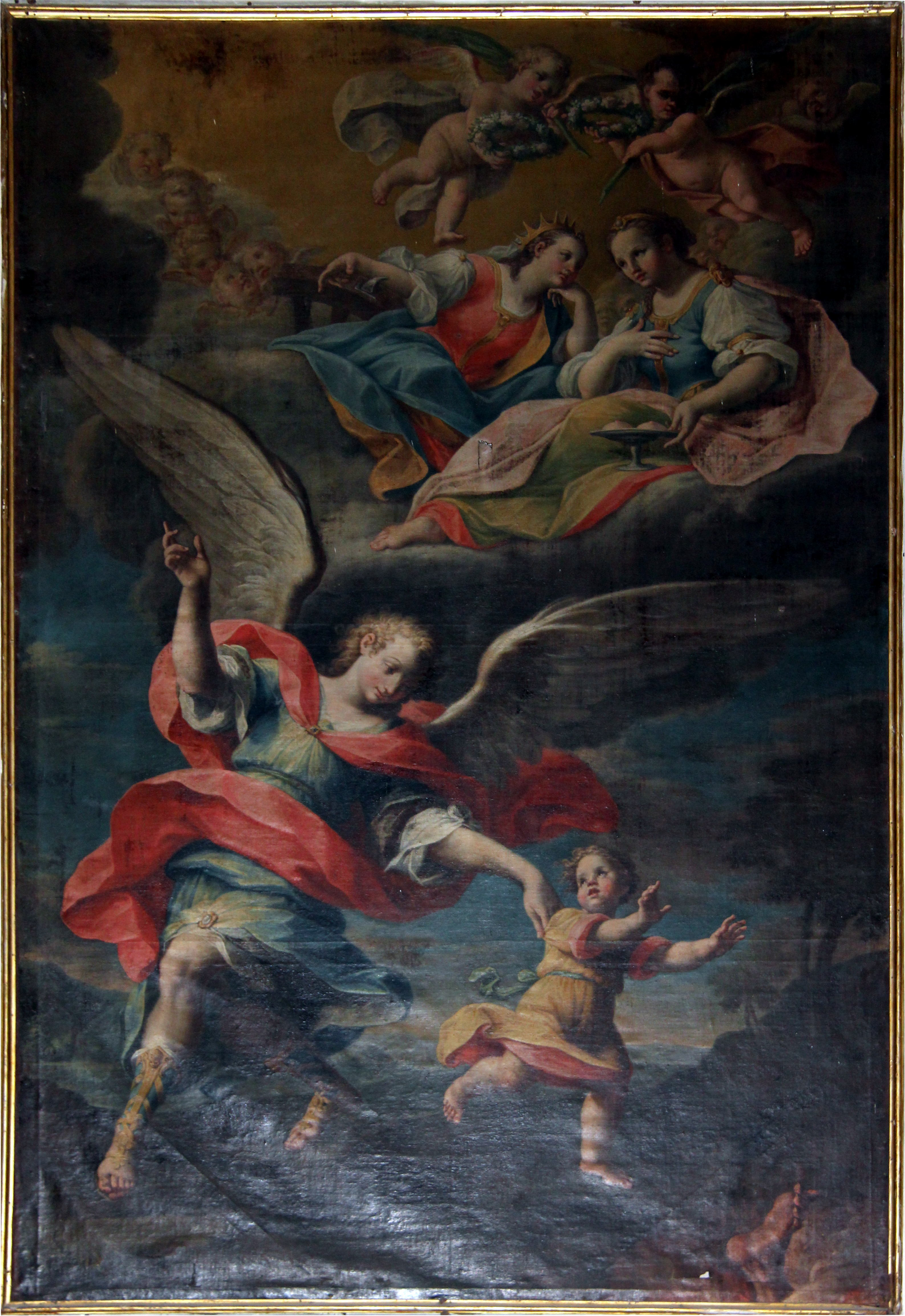
The Guardian Angel and Saints Catherine and Agatha

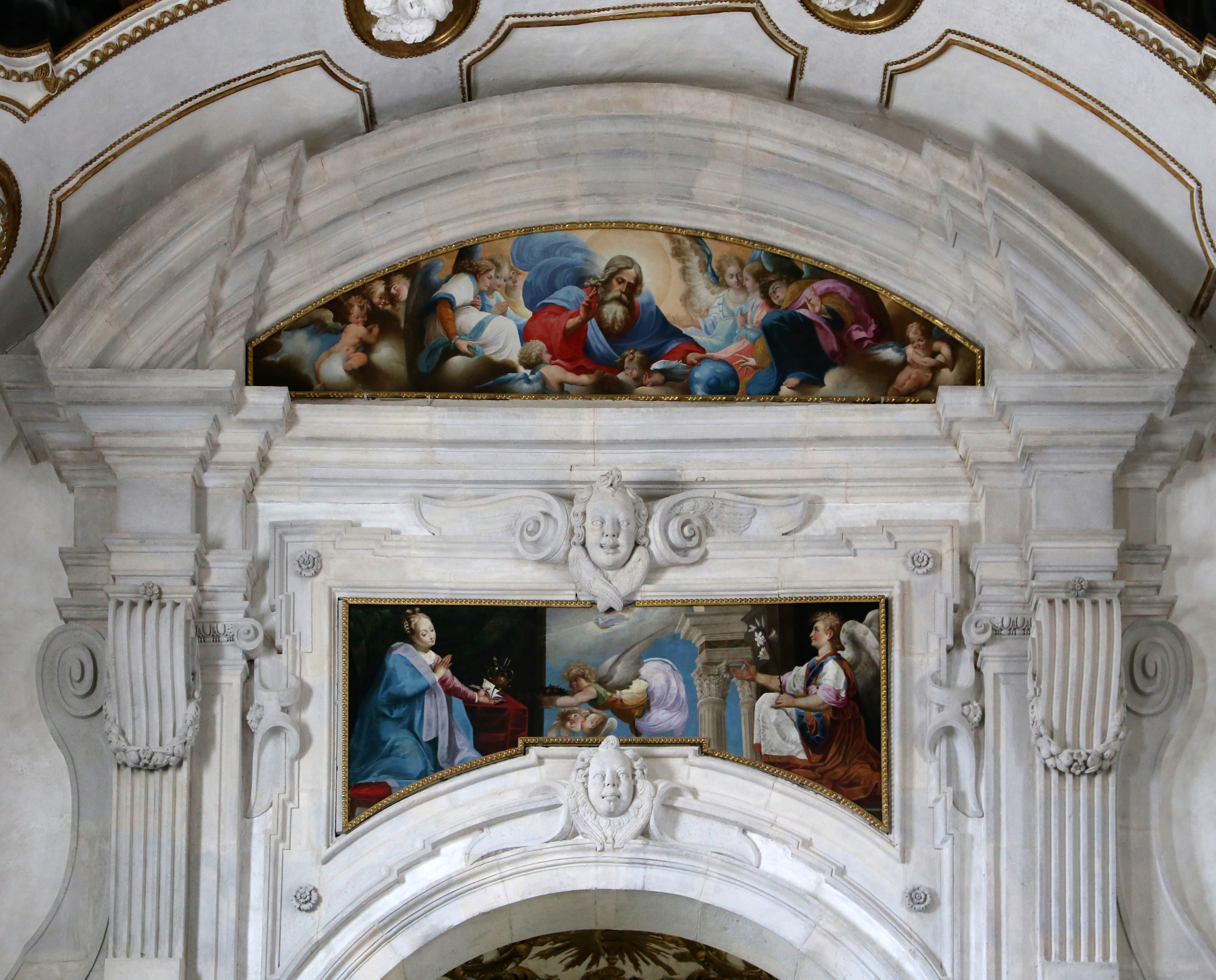
Spoleto, Chapel of the Sacrament, Annunciation by Pietro Labruzzi and Liborio Coccetti, c.1790

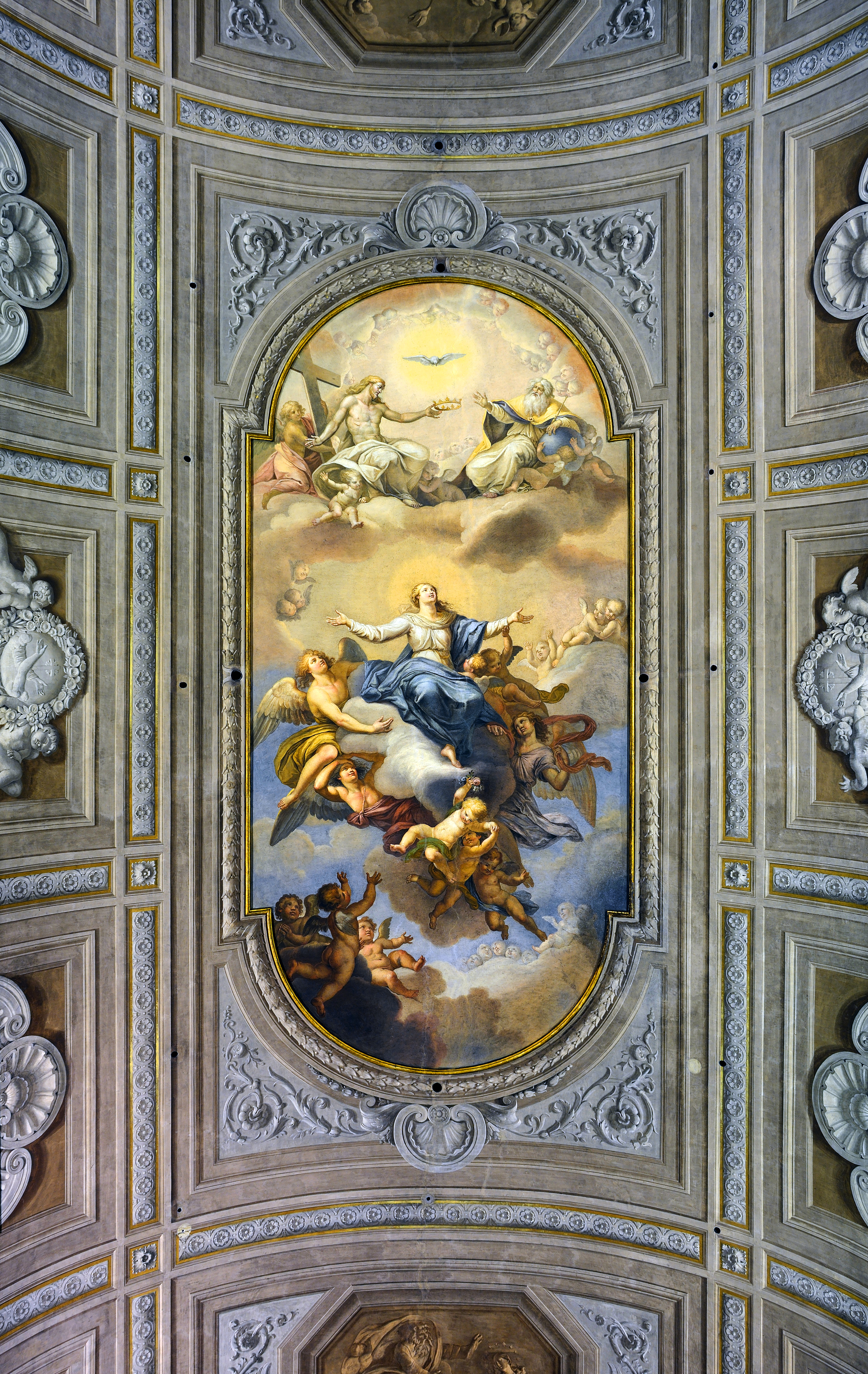
Ceiling of the "Assumption of Mary" in Santa Maria Immacolata a via Veneto, Rome
