= Crispin of Viterbo =

Italian Roman Catholic saint

Saint Crispin of Viterbo O.F.M. Cap.
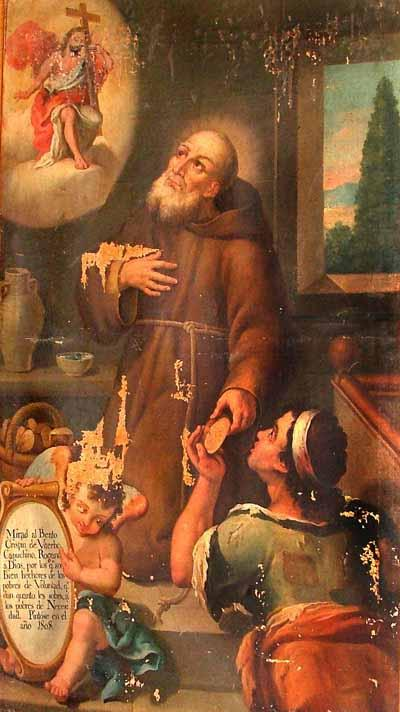
- Painting circa 1808.

Religious
- Born: 13 November 1668; Bottarone, Viterbo, Papal States
- Died: 19 May 1750 (aged 81); Rome, Papal States
- Venerated in: Roman Catholic Church
- Beatified: 7 September 1806, Saint Peter's Basilica, Papal States by Pope Pius VII
- Canonized: 20 June 1982, Saint Peter's Basilica, Vatican City by Pope John Paul II
- Major shrine: Santa Maria della Concezione dei Cappuccini, Rome, Italy
- Feast: 19 May; 21 May (Capuchins)
- Attributes: Franciscan habit

Crispino da Viterbo (born Pietro Fioretti; 13 November 1668 – 19 May 1750) was an Italian Roman Catholic professed religious from Order of Friars Minor Capuchin. Fioretti was an ardent devotee of the Mother of God and was consecrated to her protection in 1674 and he even made a small altar dedicated to her when he served in the kitchens at the house in Orvieto. He served in various roles for the order in various cities around Rome where he became a well-known figure with various nobles and prelates - even Pope Clement XI visiting him and seeking him out for advice and support. Fioretti likewise was known as a sort of wonderworker who worked miracles during his lifetime. He was also known for his warm sense of humor and his simple method for living.

The calls for him to be named as a saint began as soon as he had died and the formal cause to investigate his holiness opened on 16 September 1761 under Pope Clement XIII while he was named as Venerable in 1796 under Pope Pius VII. Pope Pius VII beatified him in 1806 while Pope John Paul II canonized him as a saint on 20 June 1982 - the first canonization in the latter's pontificate.

== Life ==
Pietro Fioretti was born on 13 November 1668 in Bottarone in Viterbo to Ubaldo Fioretti (a craftsman) and Marzia Antoni; his baptism was celebrated on 15 November in the church of San Giovanni Battista. His mother had been widowed with a daughter before she married Ubaldo. His father died sometime before Fioretti turned five.

In 1674 his mother took him to a Marian shrine that was not too far from their home where his mother consecrated him to the Mother of God to place him under her spiritual protection. It was from that point that he referred to the Blessed Mother as his "other mother". His mother had told him to "honor her as a good son would do". He was known for his piousness and for his great knowledge of the saints; the townsfolk often referred to him as "il santarello" ("the little saint"). Fioretti was educated under the Jesuits (mastering Latin) before being apprenticed to his shoemaker uncle who provided for his education.

In 1693 he applied for admission as a religious into the Order of Friars Minor Capuchin at their house in Viterbo; he assumed the religious name of "Crispino da Viterbo" upon his admittance and the commencement of his novitiate on 22 July. But Fioretti had desired to join the religious life after the sight of a Franciscan procession awoke within him the desire to serve God as a religious and the order was enthusiastic about receiving him into their ranks. He served for some time as a gardener and a cook in his hometown at the house and was later sent to Tolfa to serve as the infirmarian where he remained from 1694 to 1697. During an epidemic he is said to have effected a number of cures after turning to God for divine intervention. From Tolfa he was sent to Rome for several months and later to Albano and Bracciano until 1703.

Fioretti was later transferred in 1703 to Monterotondo where he remained until 1709 when he was transferred to Oviedo though did not arrive there until January 1710. In the kitchen there he made a small altar dedicated to the Mother of God. He knew Cardinal Filippo Antonio Gualtieri who was one such prelate who liked to meet and speak with Fioretti on a number of occasions. Fioretti liked to read about the life of Clare of Assisi and also liked reading about the lives of Fidelis of Sigmaringen and Joseph of Leonessa.

He lived an austere life devoid of the luxuries of the times. In Orvieto he lived on the first floor in a small room and he rose in the morning to meditate before he attended a number of Masses. For lunch he ate little vegetable soup or a mouthful of bread dipped in water. He would often beg for alms or go out to visit either convicts in the local prison or the sick in the hospitals and infirmaries. In the summer he slept on the roof. There was once a nun that did not treat him well and he said of it: "praise God that there is one woman in Orvieto who knows me and treats me as I deserve".

Many prominent figures visited him, including bishops, cardinals, and Pope Clement XI himself (the two would also meet occasionally at Castel Gandolfo). Clement XI even once visited him in his kitchen. He strived to embody his patron Felice di Cantalice whom he had chosen as his role model at the beginning of his religious life. In Orvieto he served as the questor where he solicited alms for the poor. The housewives became so fond of him that the superior had to re-appoint him as the questor since the townsfolk would accept no one else. He – much like his patron – used to call himself the ass or the beast of burden to his order. On one occasion, when he was asked the reason he went bare-headed, he answered that "an ass does not wear a hat." In winter 1747 he became quite ill to the point it was believed he would die so his superiors sent him to Rome. He recovered and was able to return to his duties.

His superiors sent him from Albano to Rome on 13 May 1750 when his health began to deteriorate knowing that he would die there; he himself predicted he would die in Rome before it was made public his superiors would be sending him there. Fioretti died on 19 May (he wished to die after the feast of Saint Felix of Cantalice) due to pneumonia at the Immaculate Conception convent on the Via Veneto in Rome. His remains - at present in a state of remarkable preservation - rests under one of the side altars in the famed Santa Maria della Concezione dei Cappuccini church in Rome. His remains were exhumed in 1959 and found to be incorrupt.

== Sainthood ==
The canonization process opened under Pope Clement XIII on 16 September 1761 and the investigation into his holiness was held in Rome; the confirmation of his life of heroic virtue in a papal decree allowed for Pope Pius VI to name Fioretti as Venerable on 7 July 1796. Pope Pius VII later beatified him in Rome on 26 August 1806.

The cause for Fioretti's canonization was opened on 28 February 1923. The miracle that led to his canonization was investigated in the diocese it originated in from 1958 to 1960 before the Congregation for the Causes of Saints validated that process on 18 March 1977. Medical experts confirmed that the healing in question was a miracle on 22 February 1978 while the C.C.S. officials and their consultants concurred in that assessment on 9 January 1979. The C.C.S. alone met and approved the case on 21 March 1979 before presenting it to Pope John Paul II who recognized the healing of Rinaldo Crescia on 21 May 1950 was a miracle from Fioretti's intercession. John Paul II canonized Fioretti on 20 June 1982 and his canonization served as the first canonization in John Paul II's pontificate.

== See also ==
- List of saints canonized by Pope John Paul II
