= Mario Balassi =

Italian painter

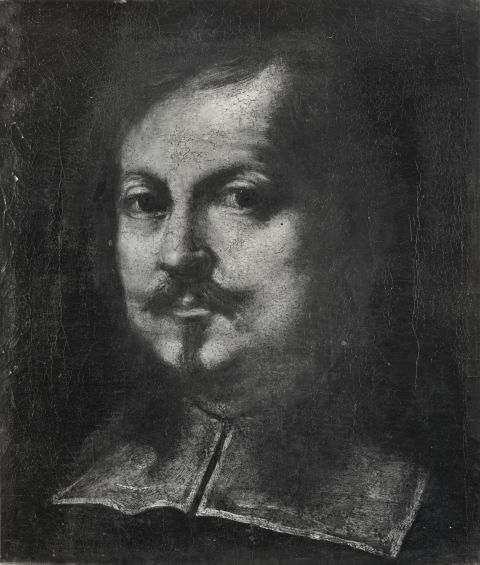
- Autorretrato de Mario Balassi.
- Born: 1604; Florence
- Died: 3 October 1667 (aged 62–63)
- Occupation: Painter

Mario Balassi (1604–1667) was an Italian painter of the Baroque period, active in Florence and Rome.

== Biography ==
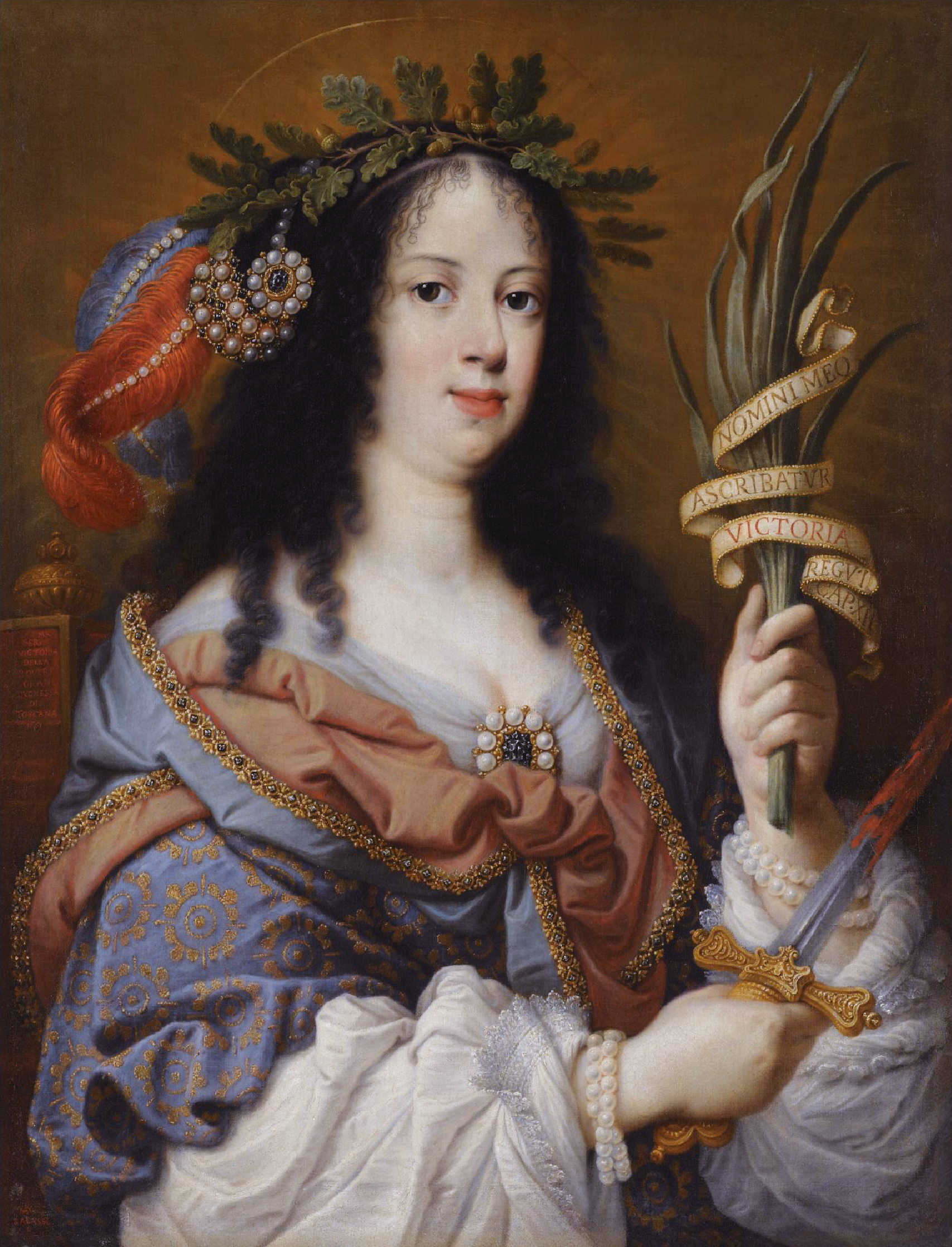
Portrait of Vittoria della Rovere as Saint Vittoria by Mario Balassi

He was born in Florence in 1604, and dedicated himself from a young age to artistic education, first as an apprentice to Jacopo Ligozzi, a Veronese artist active in Florence. When this master died, he passed to the school of Matteo Rosselli, where he remained until the age of 18 years. Finally he became a pupil of Domenico Passignano, and accompanied this master as his collaborator to Rome to work under the papacy of Pope Urban VIII. But in Rome he also worked on his own behalf, performing a Noli me Tangere for the church of San Caio (now destroyed) and produced a copy of Raphael's Transfiguration for Don Taddeo Barberini (now found in the church of the Cappuccini): the latter was praised by Passignano and Guido Reni, who said that "Mario had not copied it, but detached it from Raphael's painting".

When he lost a commission for a painting depicting the Crucifixion (at first commissioned to Balassi, but finally entrusted instead to Joachim von Sandrart), he left the patronage of the Piccolomini and embarked on the journey through Italy. He stayed in Venice for some time, where he derived, according to Baldinucci, significant enrichments to his artistic personality. Returning to his homeland, he executed a significant number of altar paintings for many churches in Florence, Prato, and Empoli.

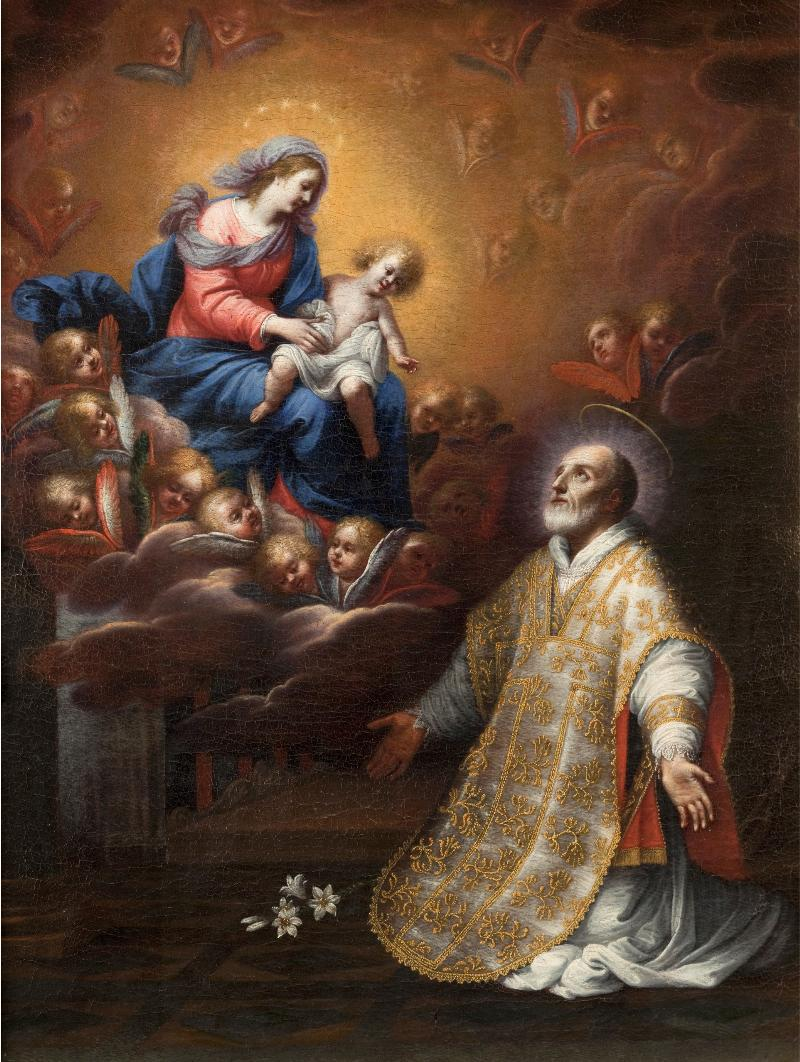
Virgin appears to Phillip Neri

For example in Florence, he painted a St Francis of Assisi for the Compagnia delle Stimmate. He also painted a Noli me tangere (Touch Me Not) for the convent of the Maddalena. For the church of Sant'Agostino, Prato, he painted a picture of St Nicolas of Tolentino.

He died in Florence on 9 October 1667 and was buried in Santa Maria Novella.

His art is visibly influenced by the heterogeneous education of his youth, as well as by the multiple orientations of the contemporaries and the different environments in which the artist found himself. If in some works the traces of Passignano and of Ligozzi are clearly recognizable, in others they play elements extraneous to the Florentine environment, probably acquired during the Roman stay; while in some, as in the San Nicola da Tolentino of Prato, the "echoes of the Flemish-Caravaggio world" are evident. Among the stylistic components of the eclectic painter, however, is the derivation from the art of Matteo Rosselli.
