= Skull Chapel =

Ossuary chapel in Kudowa-Zdrój, Poland

- Kaplica Czaszek
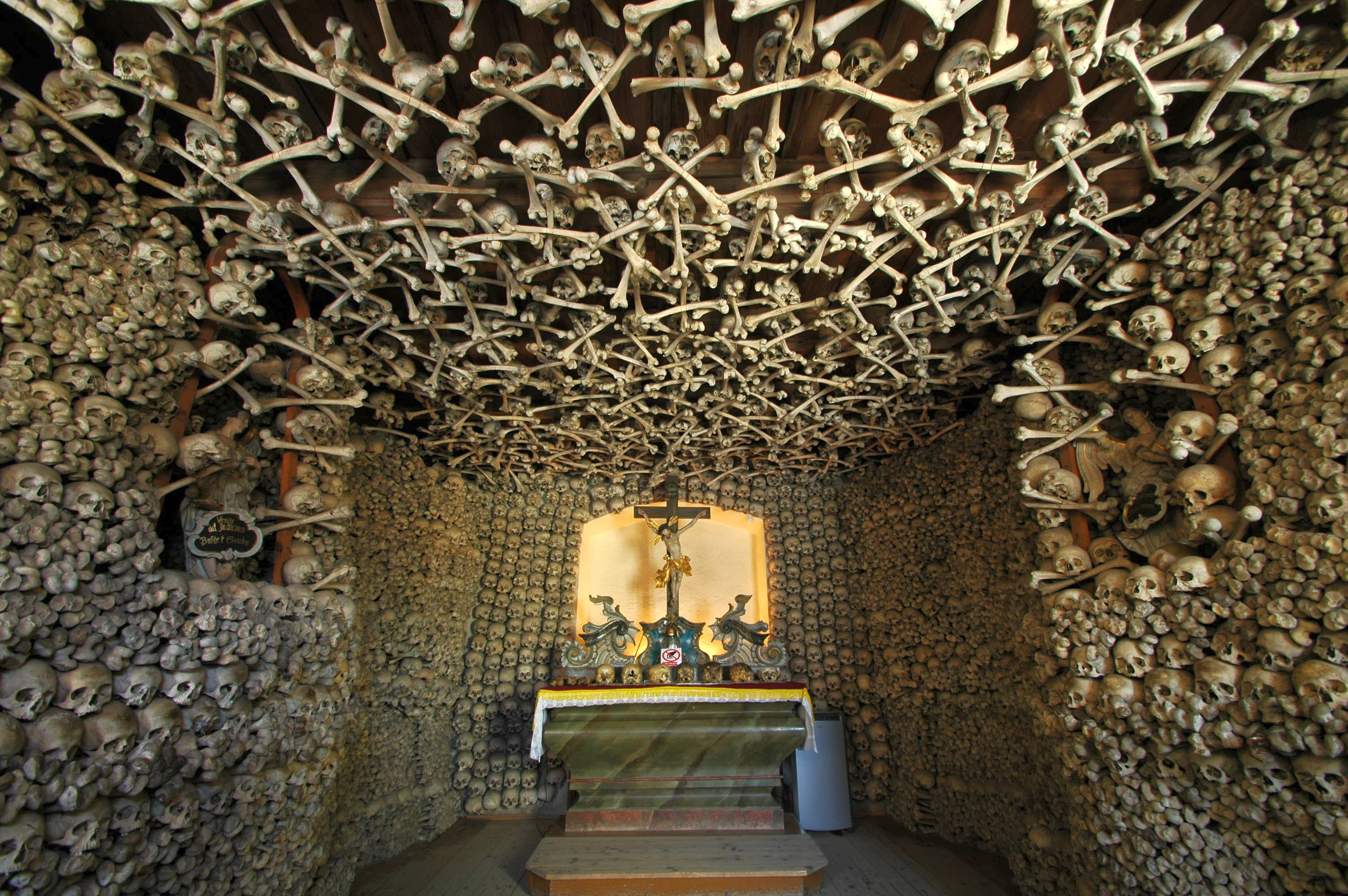
- The interior, featuring human long bones and skulls on the walls and ceiling

- Location within Poland
- 50.4515°N 16.2419°E
- Location: Kudowa-Zdrój
- Country: Poland
- Denomination: Catholic

Architecture
- Functional status: Preserved
- Heritage designation: Cultural heritage site
- Designated: 10 May 1960
- Architectural type: Chapel
- Style: Baroque
- Years built: 1776–1784

The Skull Chapel (Polish: Kaplica Czaszek) is an ossuary chapel located in the Czermna district of Kudowa-Zdrój, in southwestern Poland. Built in Baroque style in the last quarter of the 18th century, the temple serves as a mass grave with thousands of skulls and human skeletal remains adorning its interior walls, floor, ceiling, and foundations. The Skull Chapel is the only such monument in Poland, and one of five in Europe.

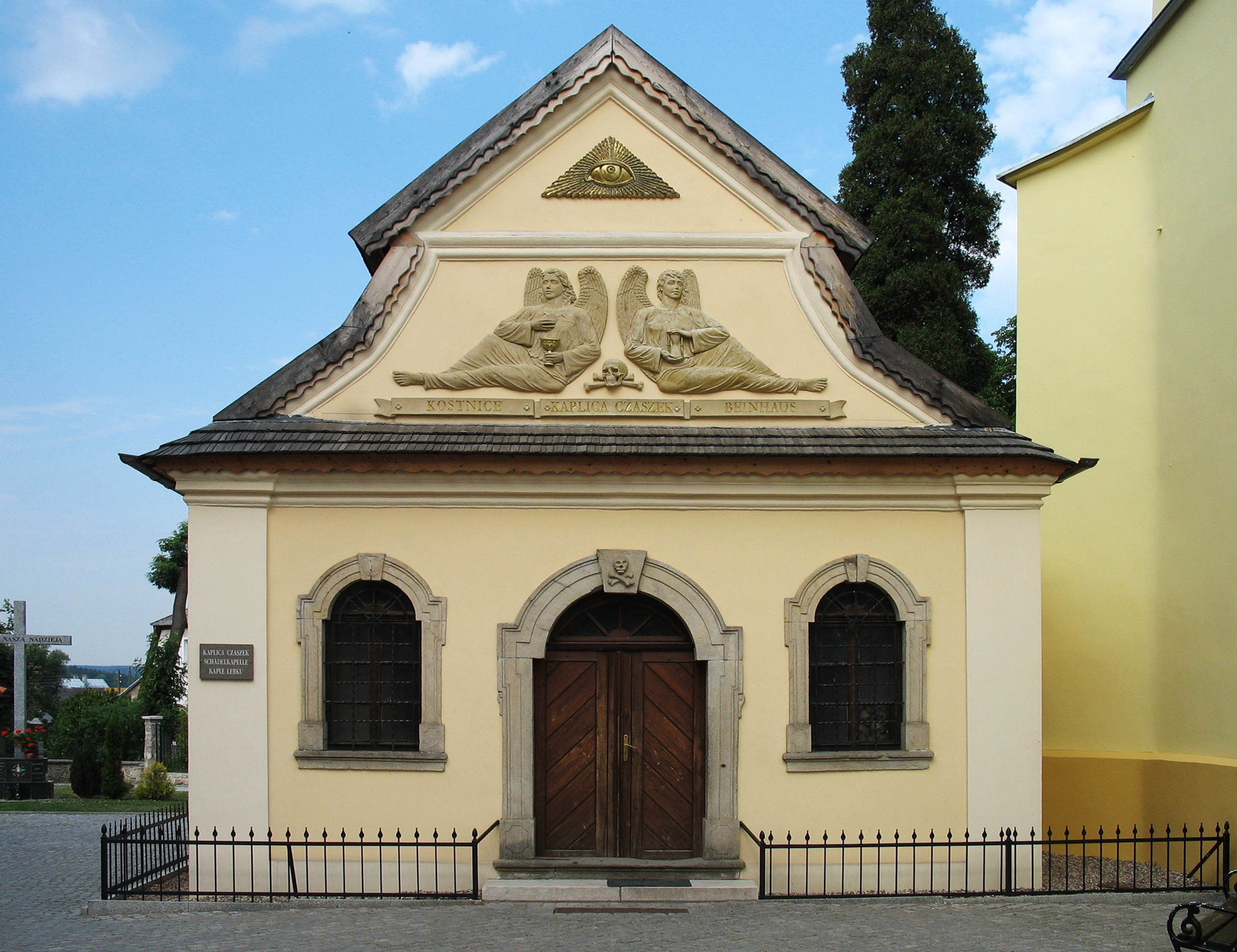
Façade

== History ==
The chapel was built in 1776 by local Bohemian parish priest Václav Tomášek. It is the mass grave of people who died during the Thirty Years' War (1618–1648), three Silesian Wars (1740–1763), and people who died because of cholera epidemics, plague, syphilis, and hunger.

Together with sacristan J. Schmidt and grave digger J. Langer, father Tomášek who was inspired by the Capuchin cemetery while on a pilgrimage to Rome, collected the casualties' bones, cleaned and put them in the chapel within 18 years (from 1776 to 1794). Walls of this small, baroque church are filled with three thousand skulls, and there are also bones of another 21 thousand people interred in the basement. The skulls of people who built the chapel, including Tomášek, were placed in the center of the building and on the altar in 1804. Inside are a crucifix and two carvings of angels with Latin inscriptions that read "arise from the dead" and "come to judgment". A recording inside the church available in three languages (Polish, Czech and German) explains the history of the chapel.

After World War II ended in 1945, a group of volunteers dedicated themselves to restoring the chapel to its former glory. Their efforts paid off, and the Skull Chapel was soon successfully restored.

== Gallery ==
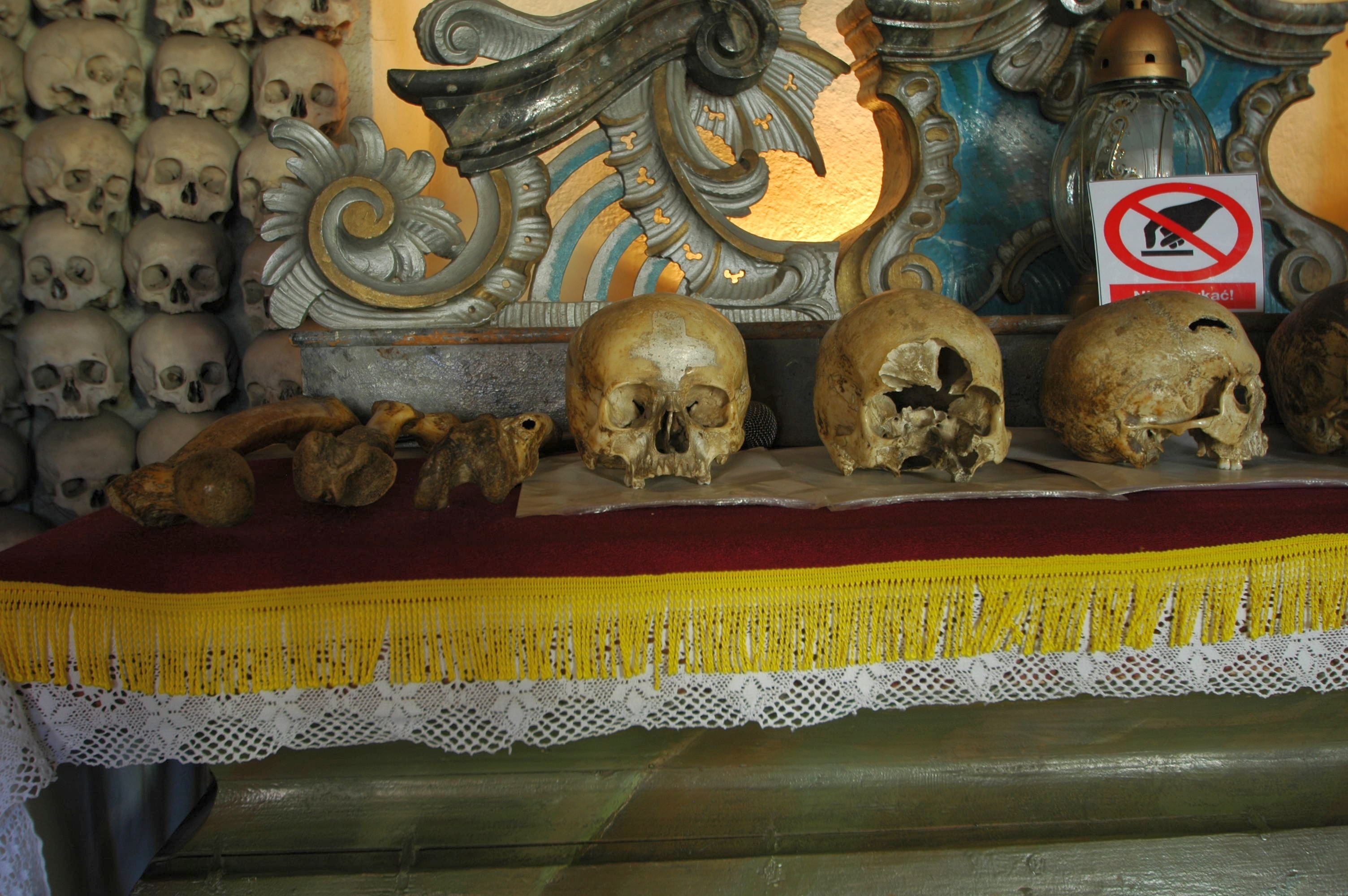

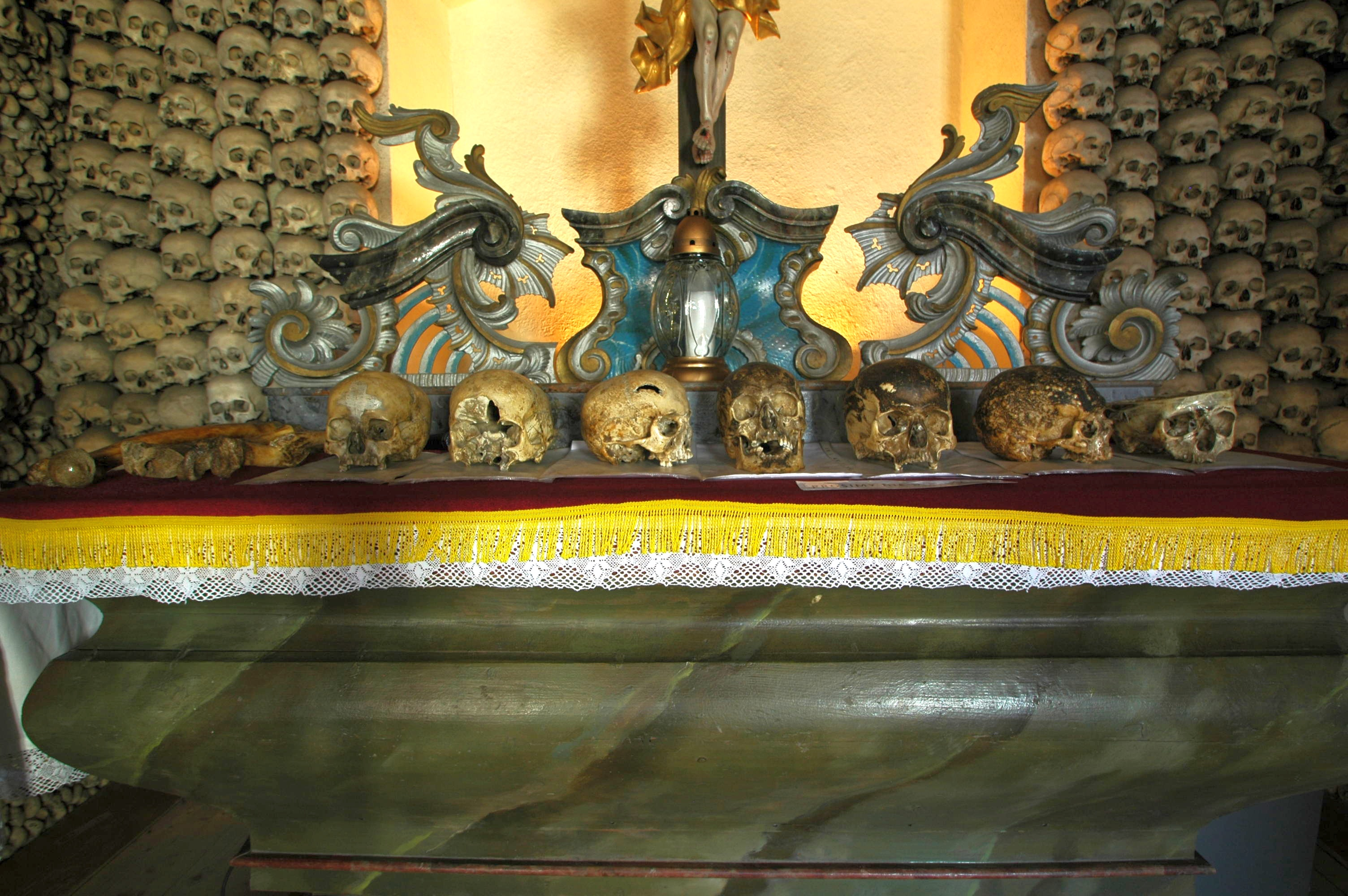

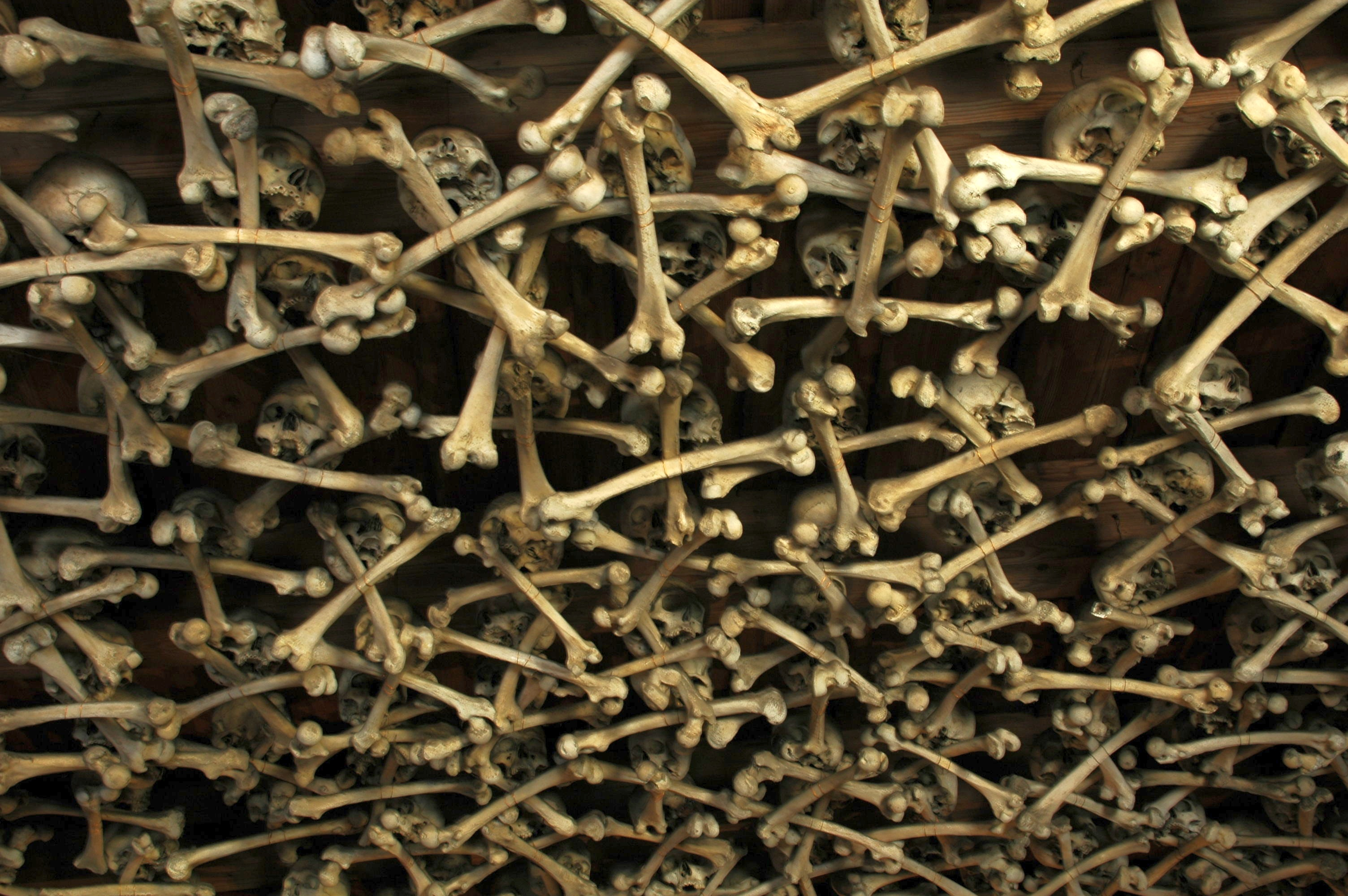

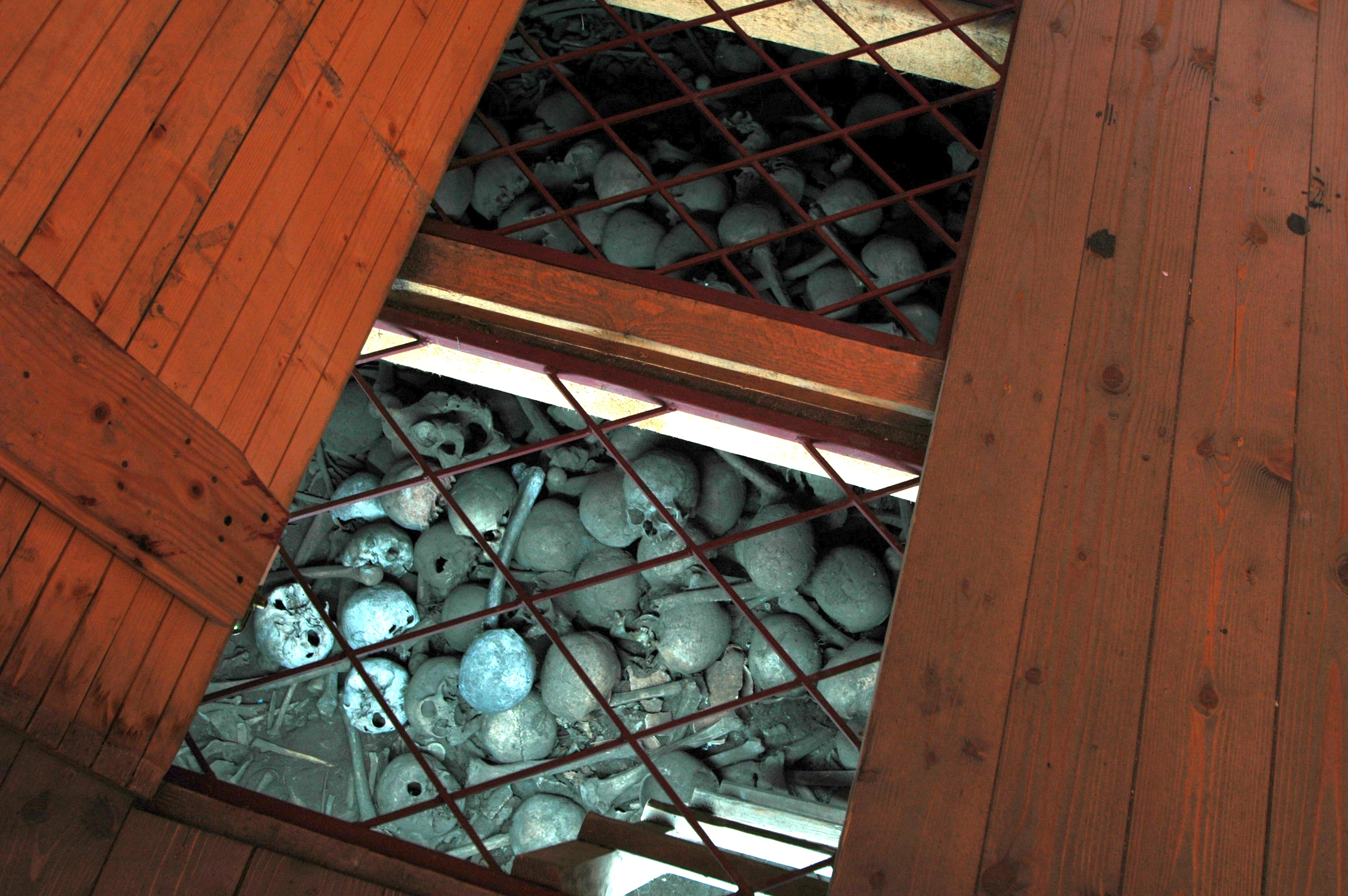

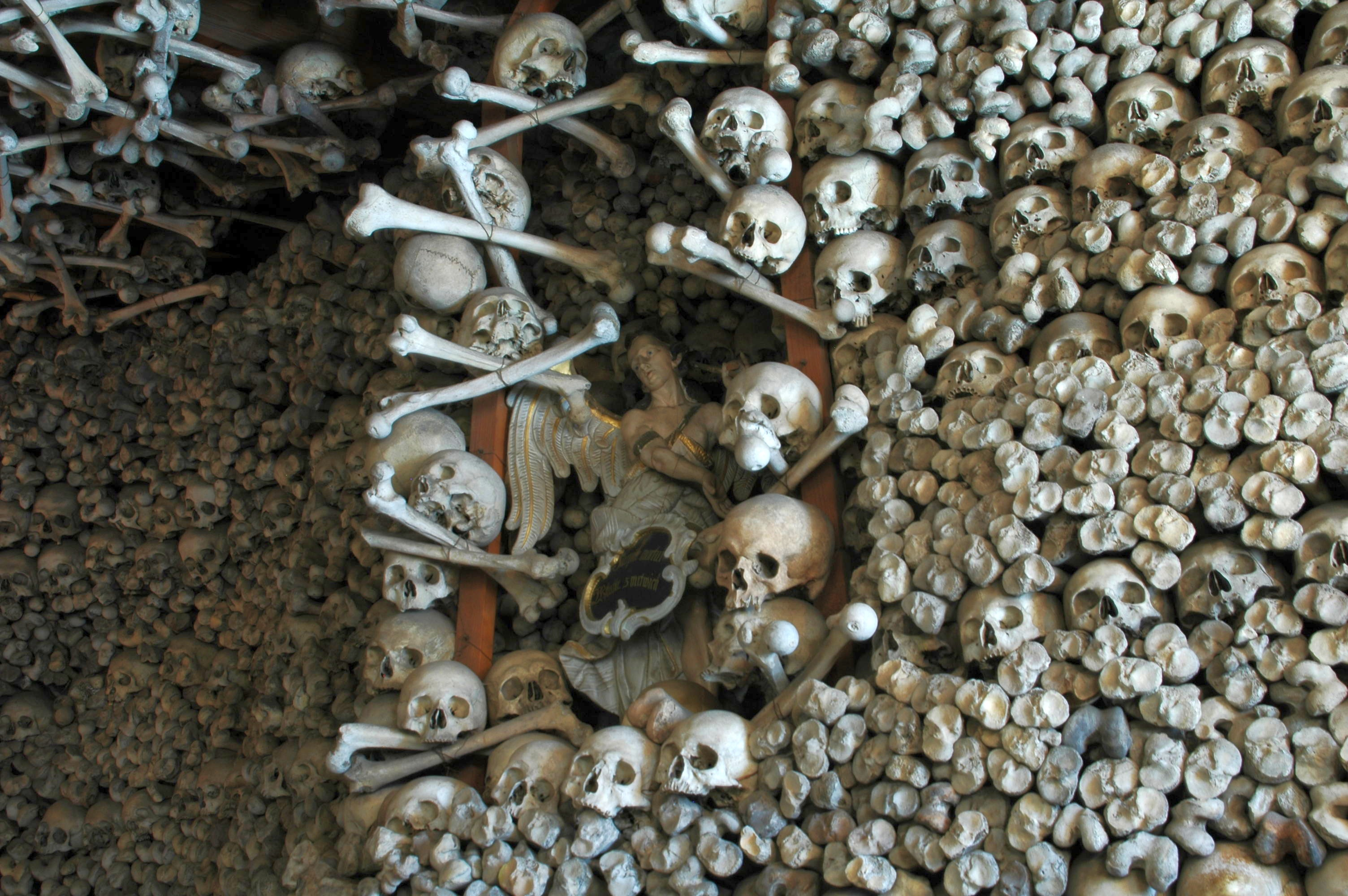

== See also ==
- Sedlec Ossuary
- Santa Maria della Concezione dei Cappuccini
- Capela dos Ossos
