= Santa Maria della Concezione dei Cappuccini =

Catholic church in Rome, Italy

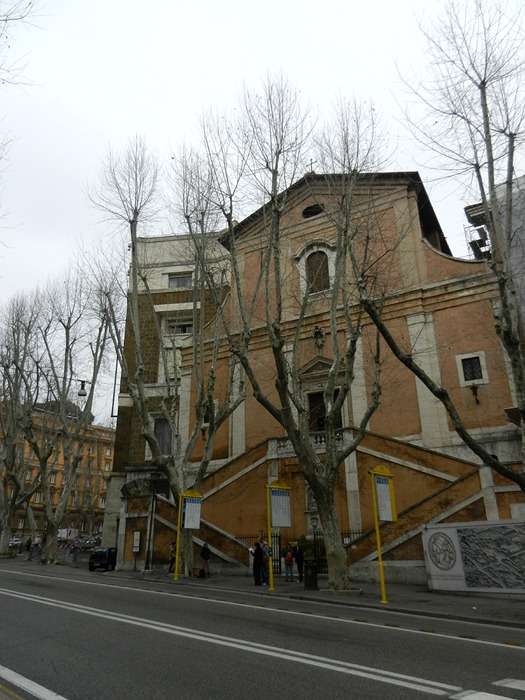
- Santa Maria della Concezione dei Cappuccini
- Click on the map for a fullscreen view
- 41°54′16.7″N 12°29′19.2″E
- Location: Via Veneto, Rome
- Country: Italy
- Denomination: Catholic
- Tradition: Latin Church
- Religious order: Capuchin Franciscans

Architecture
- Architectural type: Church

Santa Maria della Concezione dei Cappuccini (lit. Holy Mary of the Conception of the Capuchins) is a Roman Catholic church located at Via Vittorio Veneto, 27, just north of the Piazza Barberini, in Rome, Italy. It is the first Roman church dedicated to the Immaculate Conception.

== History ==
It was designed by architect Felice Antonio Casoni (1559–1634) and architect Michele da Bergamo (?–1641). Pope Urban VIII blessed its first stone on 4 October 1626, after which his Capuchin brother Cardinal Antonio Marcello Barberini began constructing it. Its first mass was held on 8 September 1630, and its construction was completed in 1631. It comprises a small nave and 10 side chapels.

== Architecture ==
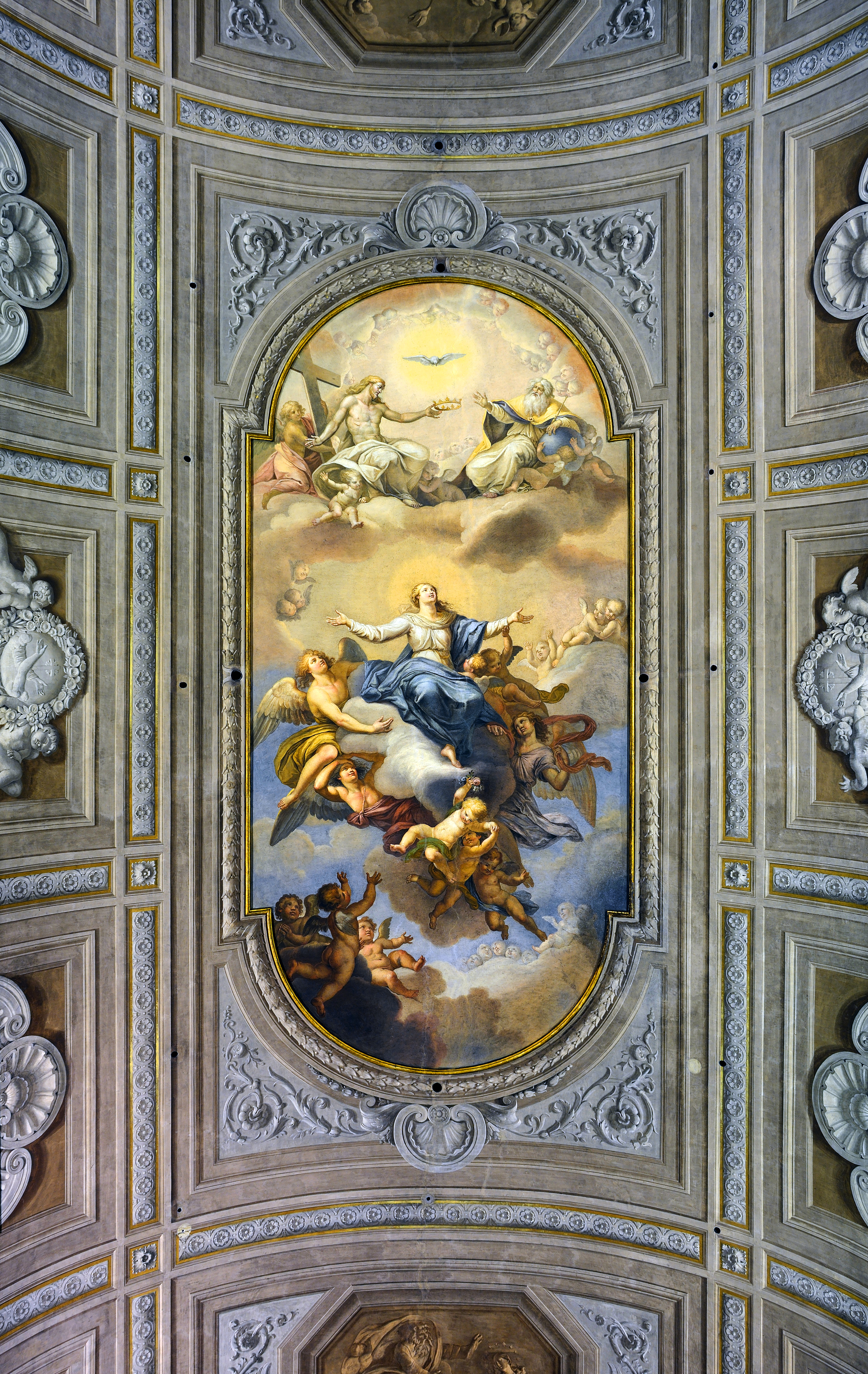
Ceiling of the "Assumption of Mary", Liborio Coccetti

The church is accessed via a scissor staircase, on which the brick facade with white stone pilasters rises. The interior has a single nave with five chapels on each side. Liborio Coccetti painted an Assumption on the barrel vault ceiling.

The main altar is built in marble by order of Pope Urban VIII; his coat of arms can be seen at the base of the two columns. The altarpiece, The Conception is by Gioacchino Bombelli, from the original by Lanfranco, destroyed by fire.

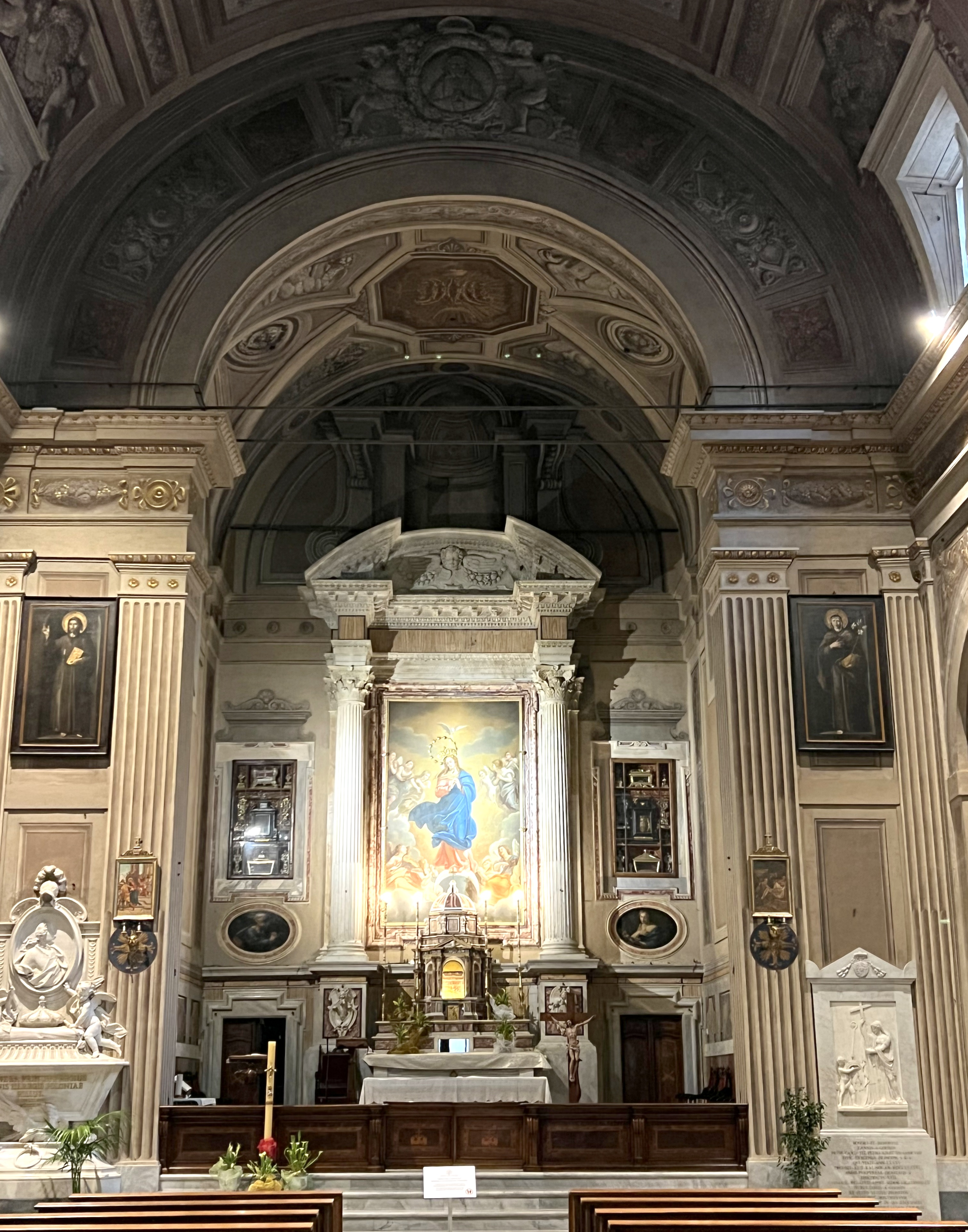
High Altar

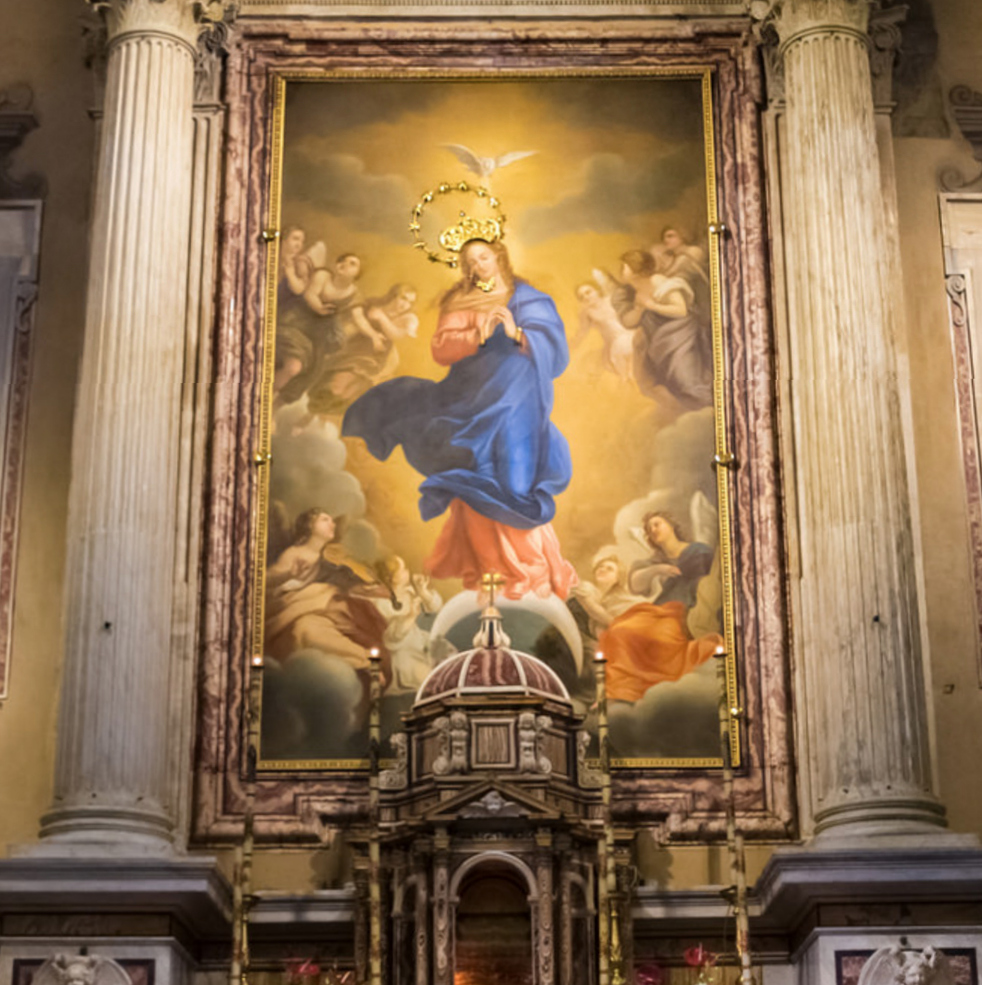
The Immaculate Conception (1814) by Bombelli

== Chapels ==
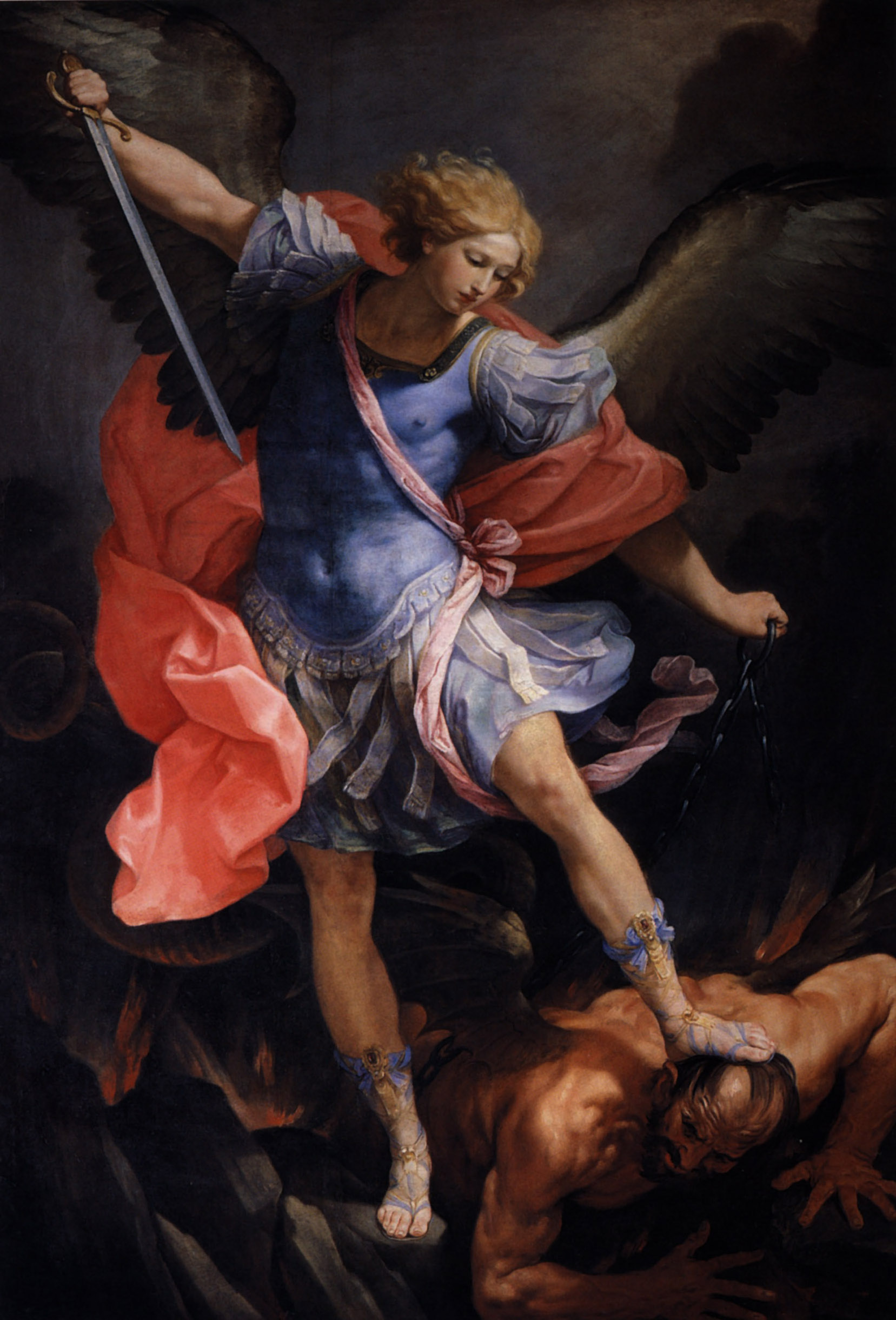
Michael the Archangel Defeats Satan (1635) by Guido Reni

The first chapel on the right has a dramatic altarpiece of St. Michael the Archangel Defeating Satan (c. 1635) by Guido Reni and Christ Mocked by Gerard van Honthorst. Two of the most important and noble families of Rome were the rival Barberini and the Pamphilj. In 1630 the Antonio Barberini commissioned from Reni a painting of the Archangel Michael for the Capuchin's church. According to a legend, Reni had heard that Cardinal Giovanni Battista Pamphilj had defamed him, or had in some way offended his reputation. The painting, completed in 1636, gave rise to a story that Reni had represented Satan—crushed under St Michael's foot—with the facial features of Cardinal Pamphilj in revenge for the slight.

The second chapel on the right has The Transfiguration by Mario Balassi commissioned by Taddeo Barberini, and a Nativity (c. 1632) by Giovanni Lanfranco. The right third chapel has Stigmatization of St. Francis by Domenichino. The right fourth chapel has Prayer in Gethsemane (c. 1632) by Baccio Ciarpi. The right fifth chapel has Saint Anthony by Andrea Sacchi.

The left fifth chapel has Apparition of the Virgin to St. Bonaventure (1645) by Andrea Sacchi. The left third chapel has Deposition (La Pieta) by Andrea Camassei and Stigmatization of Saint Francis (c. 1570) by Girolamo Muziano. The left second chapel has Santa Felice da Cantalice by Alessandro Turchi. The left first chapel has Ananias Heals Paul's Blindness (c. 1631) by Pietro da Cortona.

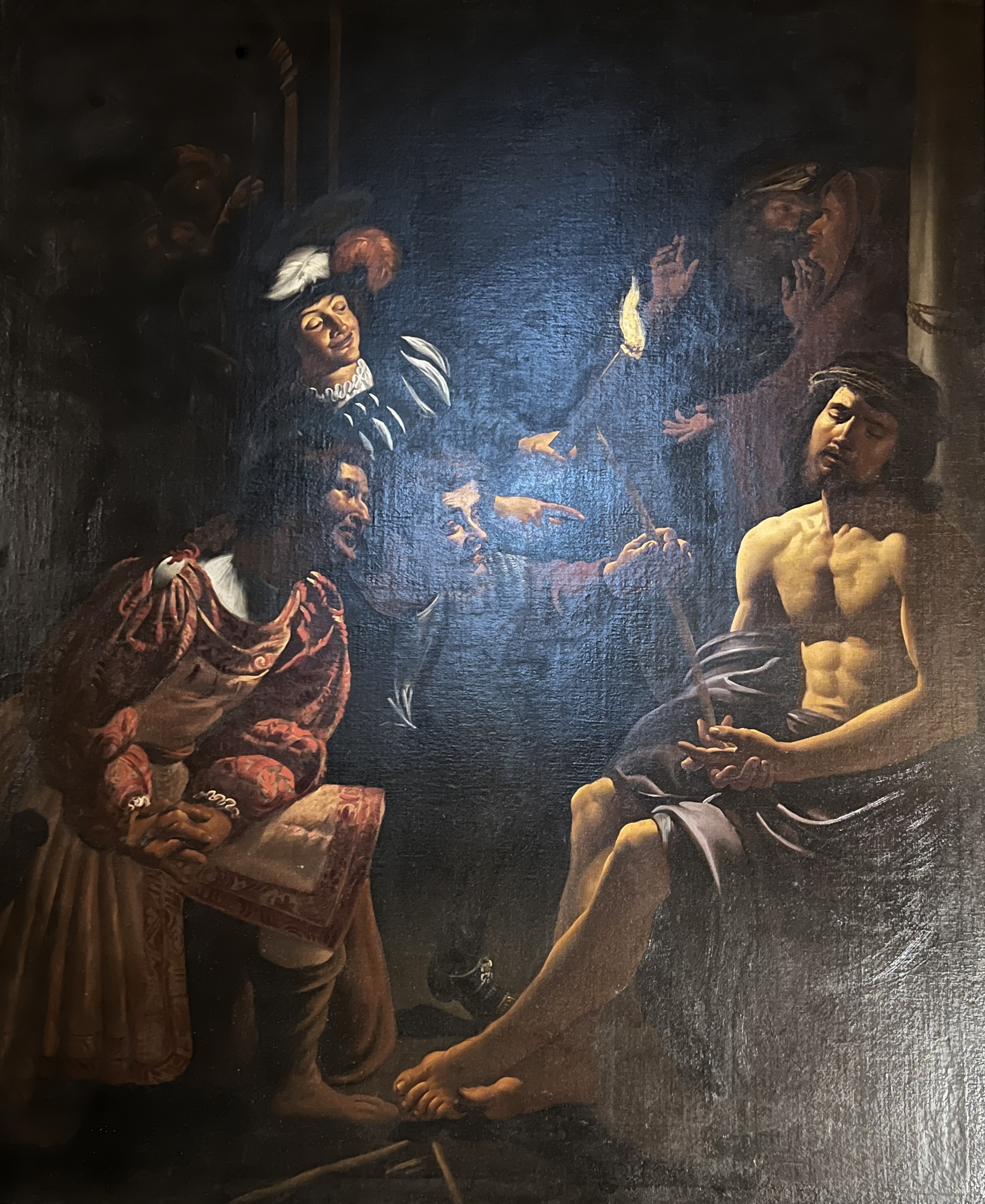
Jesus Christ Mocked (1600s) by Gerard van Honthorst

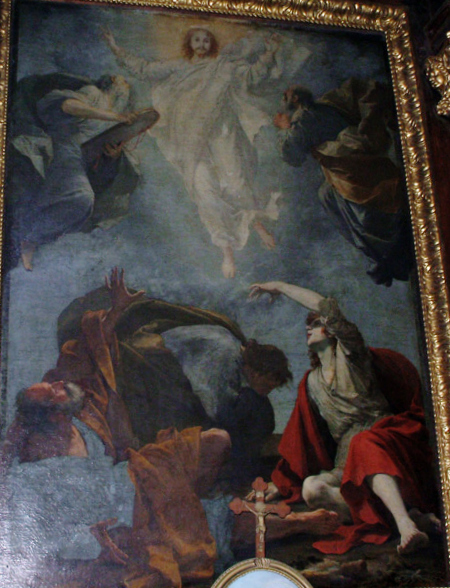
The Transfiguration (1600s) by Mario Balassi

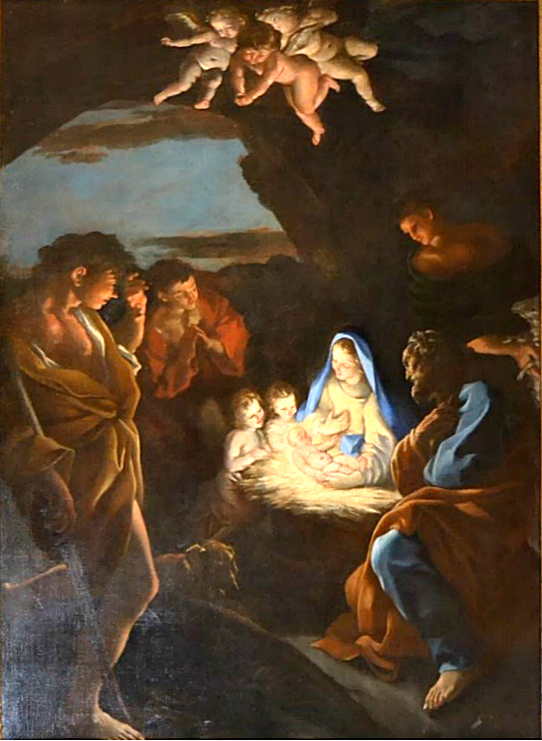
Nativity (1632) by Giovanni Lanfranco

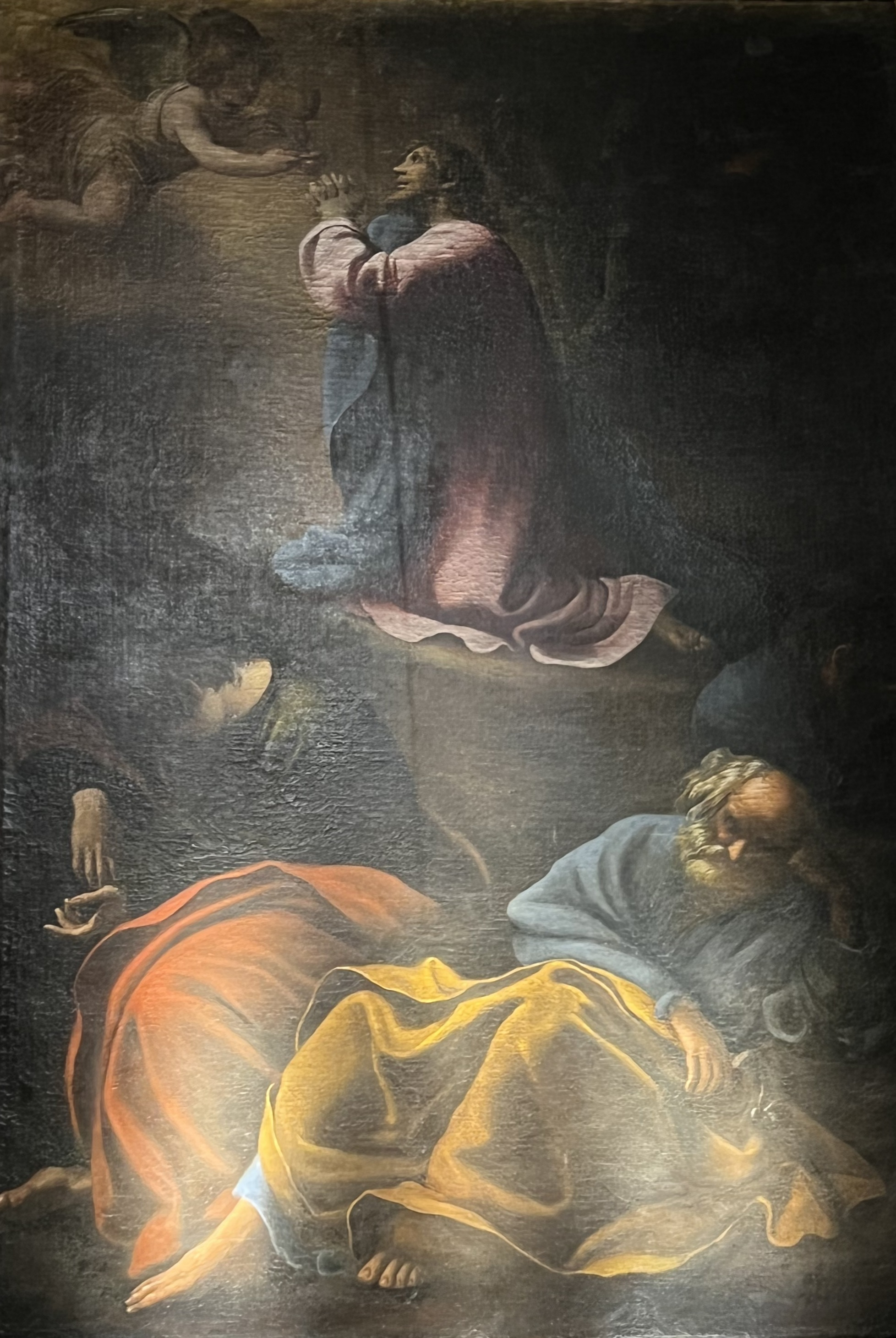
Gethsemane (1632) by Baccio Ciarpi

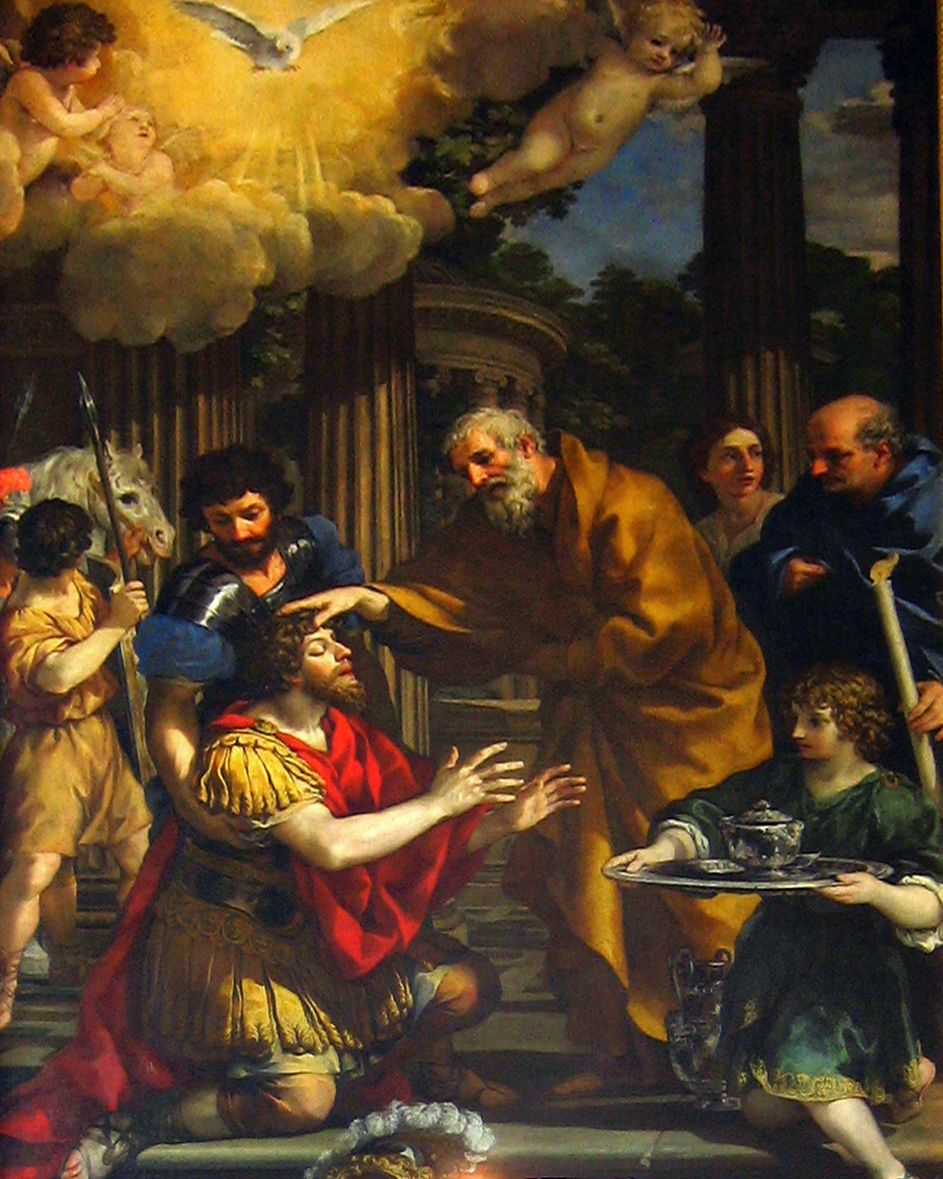
Ananias Heals Paul's Blindness (1631) by Pietro da Cortona

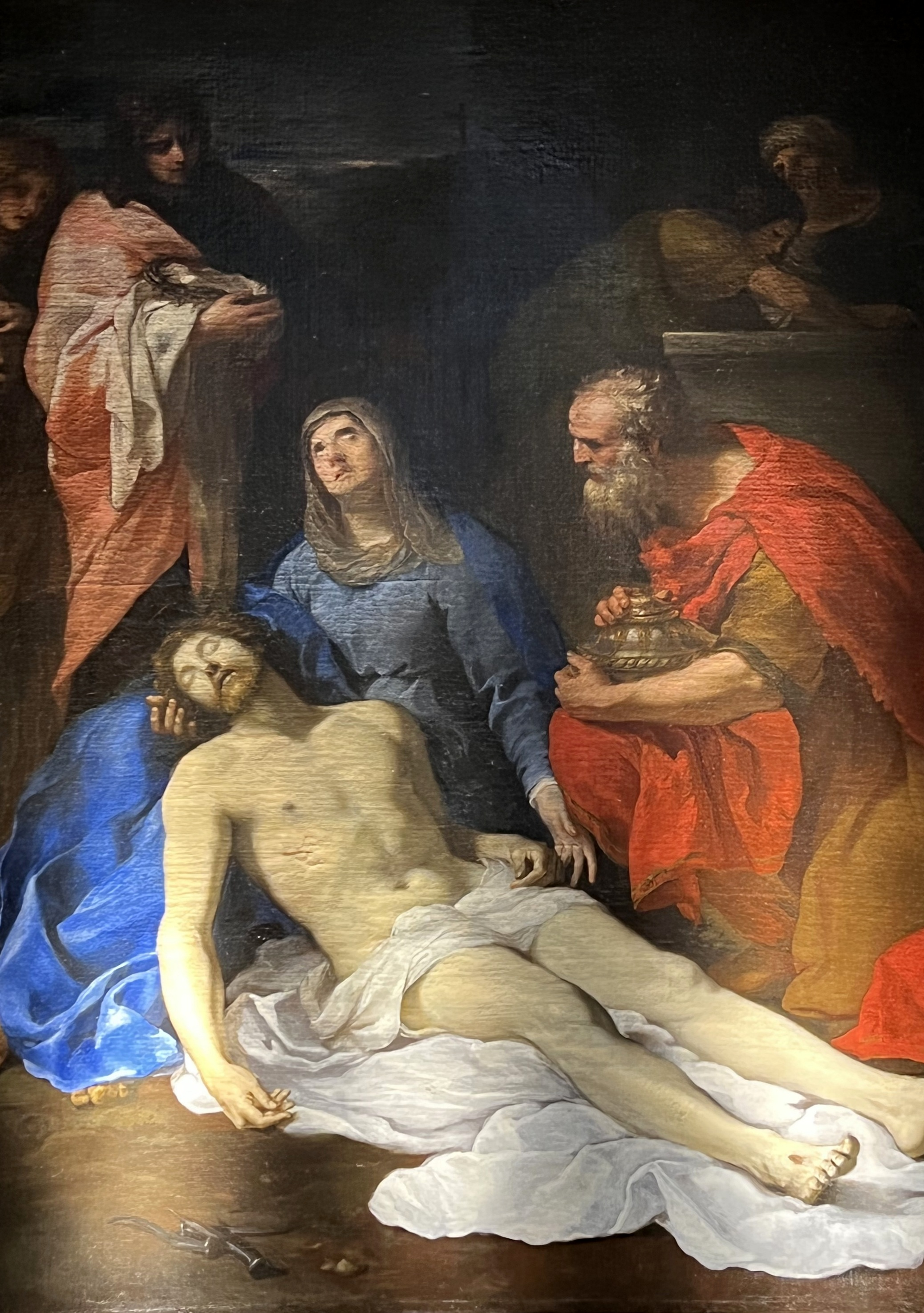
La Pieta (The Deposition) (1600s) by Andrea Camassei

== Burials ==
- St. Felix of Cantalice,
- Crispin of Viterbo,
- Cardinal Antonio Marcello Barberini
- Aleksander Benedykt Sobieski (sculpted by Camillo Rusconi) are located here.
- Mariano da Torino, (†1972) Capuchin TV presenter

== Crypt ==
The crypt is located just under the church. Cardinal Antonio Barberini, who was a member of the Capuchin order, in 1631 ordered the remains of thousands of Capuchin friars exhumed and transferred from the friary Via dei Lucchesi to the crypt.

The underground crypt is divided into five chapels, lit only by dim natural light seeping in through cracks, and small fluorescent lamps. The crypt walls are decorated with the remains in elaborate fashion, making this crypt a macabre work of art. Some of the skeletons are intact and draped with Franciscan habits, but for the most part, individual bones are used to create elaborate ornamental designs.

The crypt originated at a period of a rich and creative cult for their dead; great spiritual masters meditated and preached with a skull in hand. A plaque in one of the chapels reads, in three languages, "What you are now, we once were; what we are now, you shall be." This is a memento mori.

The popularity of the crypt as a tourist attraction once rivalled the Catacombs. The Sedlec ossuary (1870) in the Czech Republic and the Skull Chapel in Poland are said to have been inspired by it.

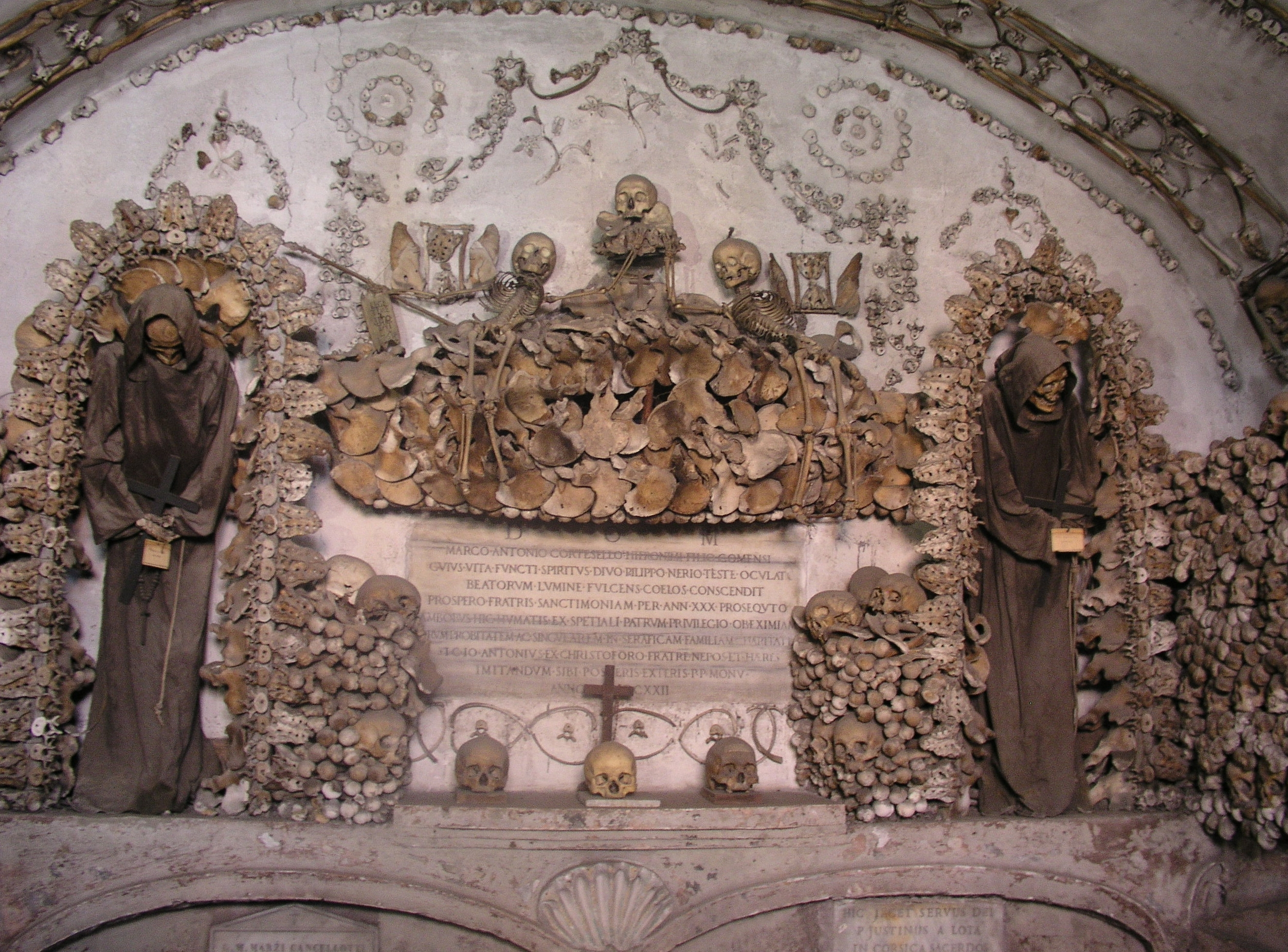

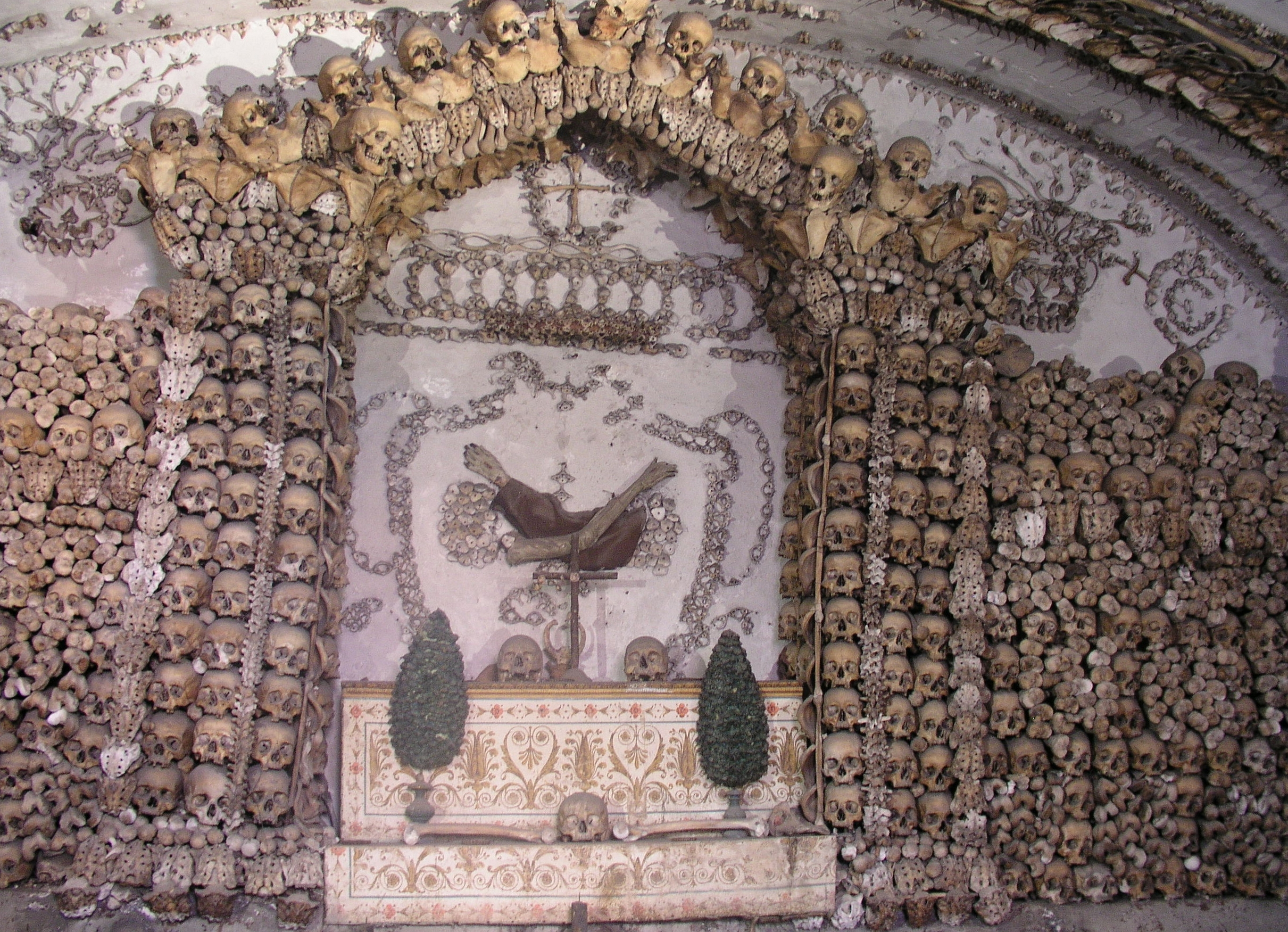

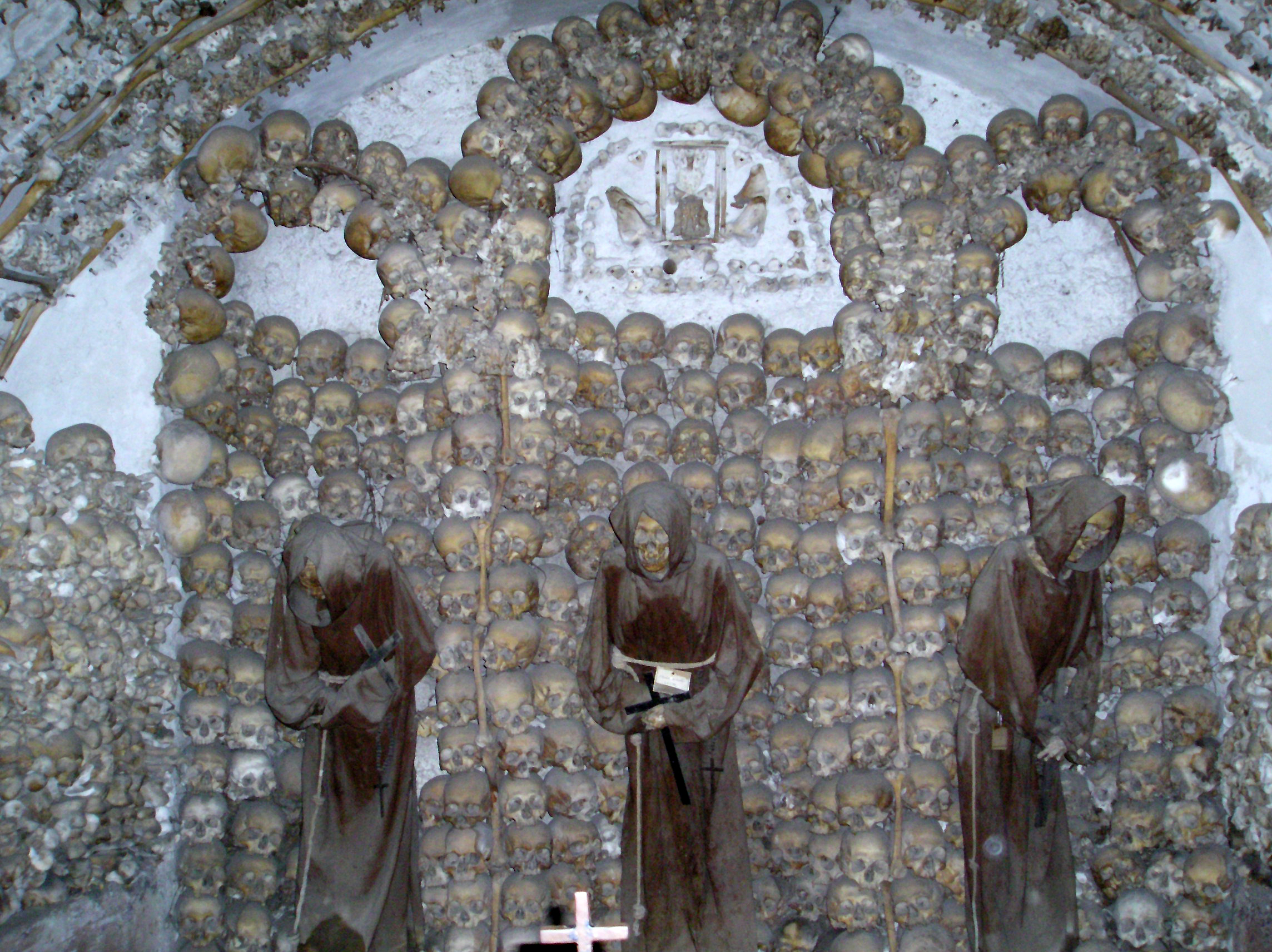
Front second ossuary's chapel

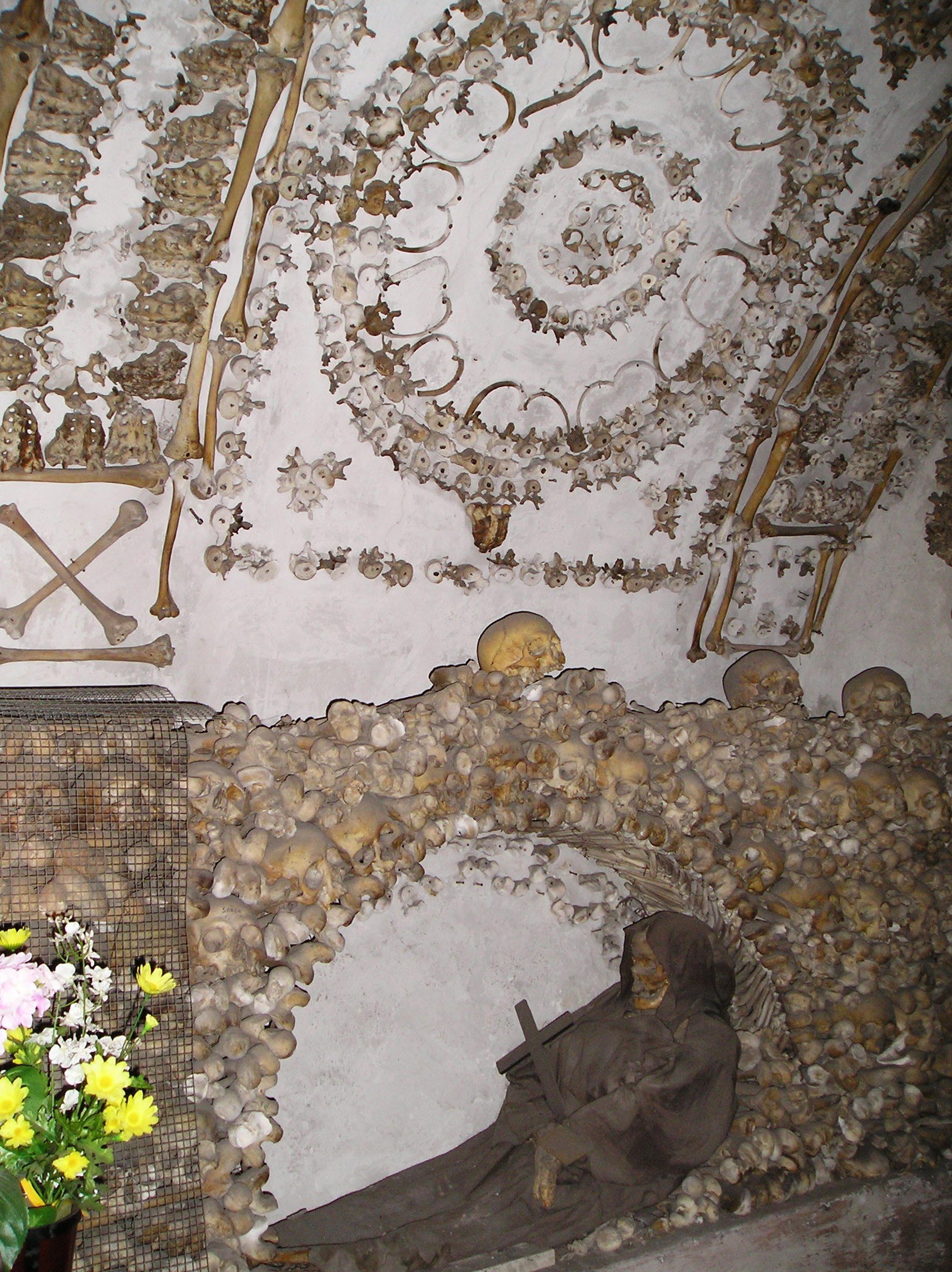
Side second ossuary's chapel

Inside the convent there is the Museum of the Capuchin Friars Minor of the Province of Rome : eight rooms that house works of art, volumes, documents, liturgical objects and Capuchin artifacts in common use.

== See also ==
- Skull Chapel in Czermna
- Sedlec Ossuary
- Tzompantli
- Capela dos Ossos
- Cele kula
