= Fear of growing old =

Fear of growing old may refer to:

- Gerascophobia
- Gerontophobia
