= Capuchin Crypt =

Ossuary in Rome, Italy

Coordinates: 41°54′16.7″N 12°29′19.2″E

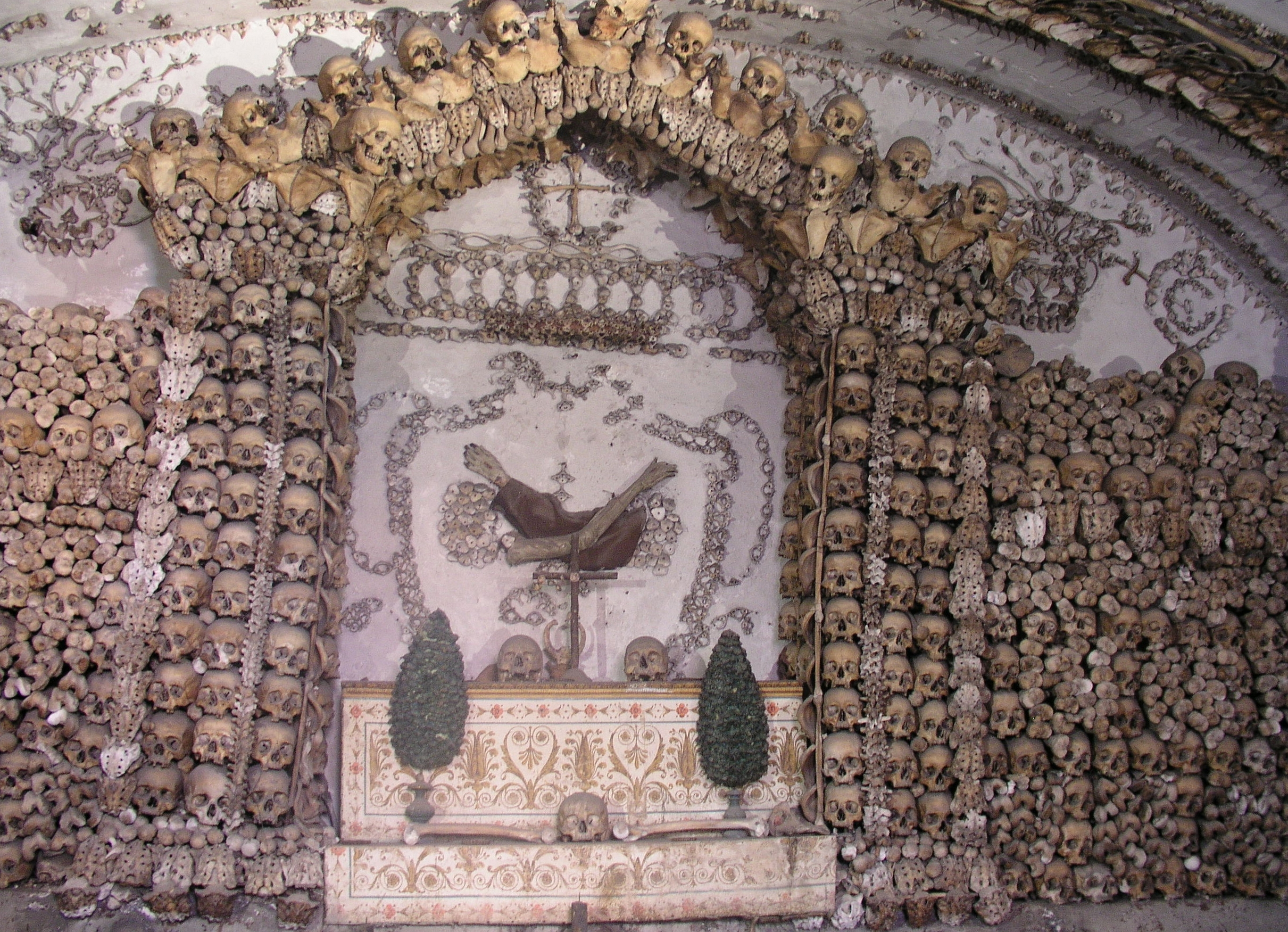
Capuchin Crypt in Rome, Italy

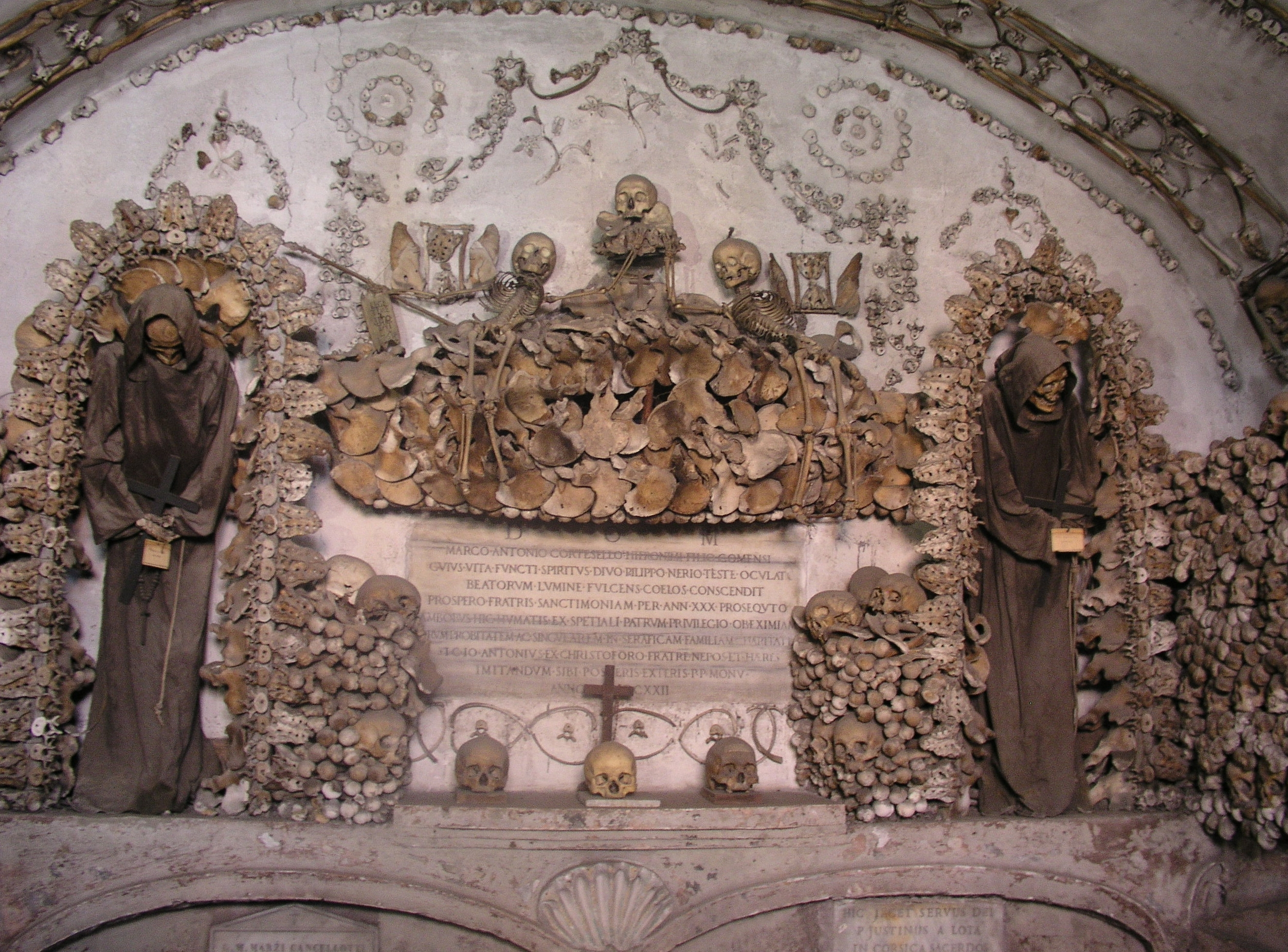
Capuchin Crypt

The Capuchin Crypt is a small space comprising several tiny chapels located beneath the church of Santa Maria della Concezione dei Cappuccini on the Via Veneto near Piazza Barberini in Rome, Italy. It contains the skeletal remains of 3,700 bodies believed to be Capuchin friars buried by their order. The order insists that the display is not meant to be macabre, but a silent reminder of the swift passage of life on Earth and of mortality.

== Crypt construction ==
The apartments for this purpose are very small, yet harbour hundreds of such tenants. They lie here till they are dried up; when they are brought to light again, in order to yield their former spaces to their successors.

— Arthur Aikin, "The Annual Review", 1806

When the friars arrived at the church in 1631, moving from the old monastery, they brought 300 cartloads of the remains of deceased friars. Fr. Michael of Bergamo oversaw the arrangement of the bones in the burial crypt. The soil in the crypt was brought from Jerusalem, by order of Pope Urban VIII.

As friars died during the lifetime of the crypt, the longest-buried friar was exhumed to make room for the newly deceased, who was buried without a coffin, and the newly reclaimed bones were added to the decorative motifs. Bodies typically spent 30 years decomposing in the soil, before being exhumed.

The bones were arranged along the walls, and the friars began to bury their own dead there, as well as the bodies of poor Romans, whose tomb was under the floor of the present Mass chapel. Here the Capuchins would come to pray and reflect each evening before retiring for the night. The crypt, or ossuary, now contains the remains of 4,000 friars buried between 1500 and 1870, during which time the Roman Catholic Church permitted burial in and under churches.

As of 1851, the crypt was only opened to the public in exchange for an admittance fee for the week following All Souls Day. As of 2022, it is open to the public daily except for certain holidays.

From 1851 to 1852, women were not admitted to the crypt.

== Crypt rooms ==
"This must be a revolting sight", said I to my friend; "and what appears to me yet more disgusting is that these remains of the dead are only exposed in this manner for the sake of levying a tax on the imbecility of the living".

— J. B. de Chatelain, 1851

There are six total rooms in the crypt, five featuring a unique display of human bones believed to have been taken from the bodies of friars who had died between 1528 and 1870.

1. Crypt of the Resurrection, featuring a painting of Jesus raising Lazarus from the dead, framed by various parts of the human skeleton.
2. The Mass Chapel, as an area used to celebrate Mass, does not contain bones. In the altar-piece, Jesus and Mary exhort St. Felix of Cantalice, St. Francis of Assisi, and St. Anthony of Padua to free souls from Purgatory. The chapel contains a plaque with the acronym DOM, which stands for Deo optimo maximo ("To God, the best and greatest"), a term initially used to refer to the pagan god Jupiter, but claimed by later Christians. The plaque contains the actual heart of Maria Felice Peretti, the grand-niece of Pope Sixtus V and a supporter of the Capuchin order. The chapel also contains the tomb of the Papal Zouaves who died defending the Papal States at the battle of Porta Pia.
3. Crypt of the Skulls
4. Crypt of the Pelvises
5. Crypt of the Leg Bones and Thigh Bones
6. Crypt of the Three Skeletons: The center skeleton is enclosed in an oval, the symbol of life coming to birth. In its right hand it holds a scythe, symbol of death which cuts down everyone, like grass in a field, while its left hand holds the scales, symbolizing the good and evil deeds weighed by God when he judges the human soul. A placard in five languages declares: "What you are now we used to be; what we are now you will be."

== Literary references ==
- The Marquis de Sade visited it in 1775 and wrote in his journal, "I have never seen anything more striking." (Voyage d'Italie, page 106 of the Maurice Lever edition).
- Nathaniel Hawthorne described its grotesque nature in his 1860 novel The Marble Faun (chapter 21).
- Mark Twain visited it in the summer of 1867 and wrote in his 1869 book The Innocents Abroad (chapter 28): "The reflection that [the Capuchian friar] must someday be taken apart like an engine or a clock...and worked up into arches and pyramids and hideous frescoes, did not distress this monk in the least. I thought he even looked as if he were thinking, with complacent vanity, that his own skull would look well on top of the heap and his own ribs add a charm to the frescoes which possibly they lacked at present."
- Folke Henschen (1881–1977) described it in his 1965 non-fiction book The Human Skull: A Cultural History.
- Tom Weil described it in his 1991 non-fiction book The Cemetery Book: Graveyards, Catacombs and Other Travel Haunts Around the World.
- Kristan Lawson and Anneli Rufus described it in their 1999 non-fiction book Weird Europe: A Guide to Macabre, Bizarre and Just Plain Weird Sights.
- Christine Quigley described it in her 2001 non-fiction book Skulls and Skeletons: Human Bone Collections and Accumulations (pp. 175–176).
- Gyles Brandreth featured it substantially in his 2011 murder mystery Oscar Wilde and the Vatican Murders featuring Oscar Wilde as the detective.

== See also ==
- Capuchin catacombs of Palermo
- Capela dos Ossos
- Sedlec Ossuary
- The Skull Chapel in Czermna
