= Capela dos Ossos (Faro) =

Ossuary chapel in Faro, Portugal

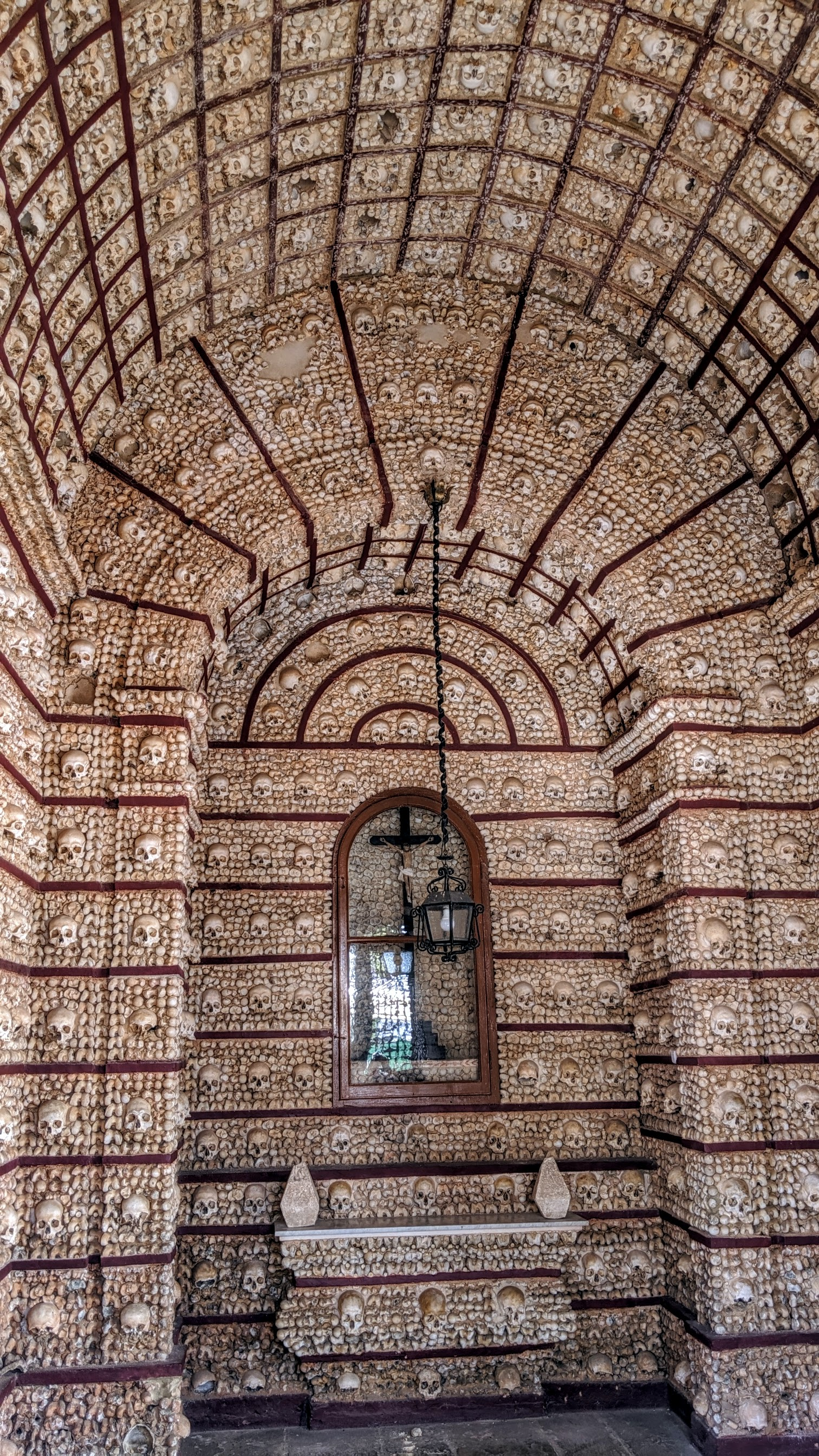
- Interior of Capela dos Ossos
- Capela dos Ossos
- 37.019901°N 7.934527°W
- Location: Faro, Portugal
- Denomination: Catholic

History
- Status: Active
- Consecrated: 1816

Specifications
- Materials: Stone

The Capela dos Ossos (transl. Chapel of Bones) is an ossuary chapel in Faro, Portugal, which belongs to the 18th century Carmelite church, Nossa Senhora do Carmo.

Above the entrance, there is the following inscription:

Pára aqui a considerar que a este estado hás-de chegar

which translates to

Stop here and consider, that you will reach this state too.

The 4 by 6 metre-sized chapel is built of the bones of more than 1,000 Carmelite friars and has been inaugurated in 1816. It is situated behind the main church and contains also 1,245 skulls.

== See also ==
- Capela dos Ossos in Évora, the more famous chapel of bones
