= Igreja de São Francisco (Évora) =

Church building in Portugal

Coordinates: 38.569°N 7.909°W

Church of St. Francis
- Façade of the Church of St. Francis
- Church of St. Francis
- Location: Évora
- Country: Portugal
- Denomination: Catholic Church

The Church of St. Francis (Portuguese: Igreja de São Francisco) is located in Évora, Portugal. It is best known for its Chapel of Bones (Capela dos Ossos). The Church was classified as National Monument in 1910.

== Overview ==
This huge church was built in Gothic style (with some Manueline influences) between 1475 and the 1550s to the design of Martim Lourenço, replacing an earlier Romanesque church of 1226. This church is one of a kind through its narthex with arcades in front of the church. The arcade is formed by seven arches with different forms (semicircular, pointed or horseshoe arches), a typical blend of Gothic and Moorish elements.

The battlemented façade has conical or spiral-shaped spires. The Manueline entrance to the church carries above a pelican, emblem of king João II and an armillary, emblem of king Manuel I.

The church shows majestic proportions : 36 x 34 x 24 m. The single, groin-vaulted nave gives a wide impression, accentuated by the white mortar on the walls and the columns. This is the largest nave of this kind to be found in Portuguese churches. The spacious vault of the crossing rests on ogival arches. The father of Portuguese drama Gil Vicente is buried at the left side of the entrance.

The chancel (early 16th century) with the main altar (from a later date) displays Renaissance features. But the choir stalls were made in different art styles : the right one in Renaissance, the left in Baroque style. The altars in the transept are decorated with gilded sculpturework (talha dourada) framing 16th century panels, probably painted by Flemish artists.

The sides of the nave contain twelve open chapels, built between the buttresses of the wall.

== Chapel of Bones ==
Interior of the Chapel of Bones

The Chapel of Bones (Capela dos Ossos) was built in the 17th century as a reminder of the transience of human life. Its walls and pillars are lined with thousands of human bones and skulls from burial grounds associated with the convent.

== See also ==
List of churches in Portugal

== Gallery ==
Entrance portals

Nave looking towards the chancel

Chancel and vaulted ceiling

Side chapels and pulpit

Side chapel with a gilded altarpiece

Chapel of the Third Order

Stained-glass window

Former chapter house
