= Magnificent Corpses =

1999 book by Anneli Rufus

Magnificent Corpses: Searching Through Europe for St. Peter's Head, St. Claire's Heart, St. Stephen's Hand, and Other Saintly Relics
- Author: Anneli Rufus
- Language: English
- Subject: Religion
- Publisher: Marlowe & Company
- Publication date: 1999
- Publication place: United States
- Media type: Hardcover, Paperback
- ISBN: 1-56924-687-4
- OCLC: 41165215
- Dewey Decimal: 235/.2/094 21
- LC Class: BX2333 .R84 1999

Magnificent Corpses: Searching Through Europe for St. Peter's Head, St. Claire's Heart, St. Stephen's Hand, and Other Saintly Relics (1999) is a book written by Anneli Rufus, concerning relics enshrined in Europe's churches and cathedrals.

== Synopsis ==
Rufus relates the stories behind the saints memorialized and the history of relic veneration. As a non-Catholic, she also describes her experiences of visiting the reliquaries of various saints and the pilgrims that still visit them.

== Reception ==
In his review for Salon.com, Frank Browning stated: "Rufus not only tells us the saintly lore, she leads us into the chapels to join the pierced punkers, the helmeted bikers, the terrified children she finds contemplating the holy body parts. Her prose is spare; she allows the scenes to make their own commentary..."

== See also ==
- Pilgrim
- Pilgrimage
- Relic
- Veneration of the dead
