= Memento mori =

Artistic or symbolic reminder of the inevitability of death

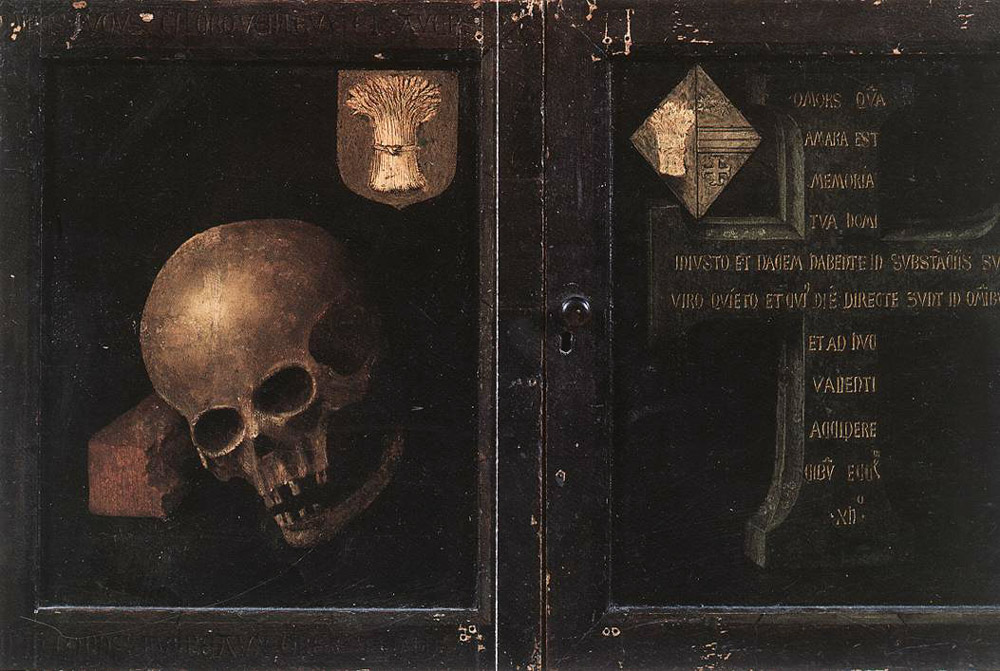
The outer panels of Rogier van der Weyden's Braque Triptych (c. 1452) show the skull of the patron displayed on the inner panels. The bones rest on a brick, a symbol of his former industry and achievement.

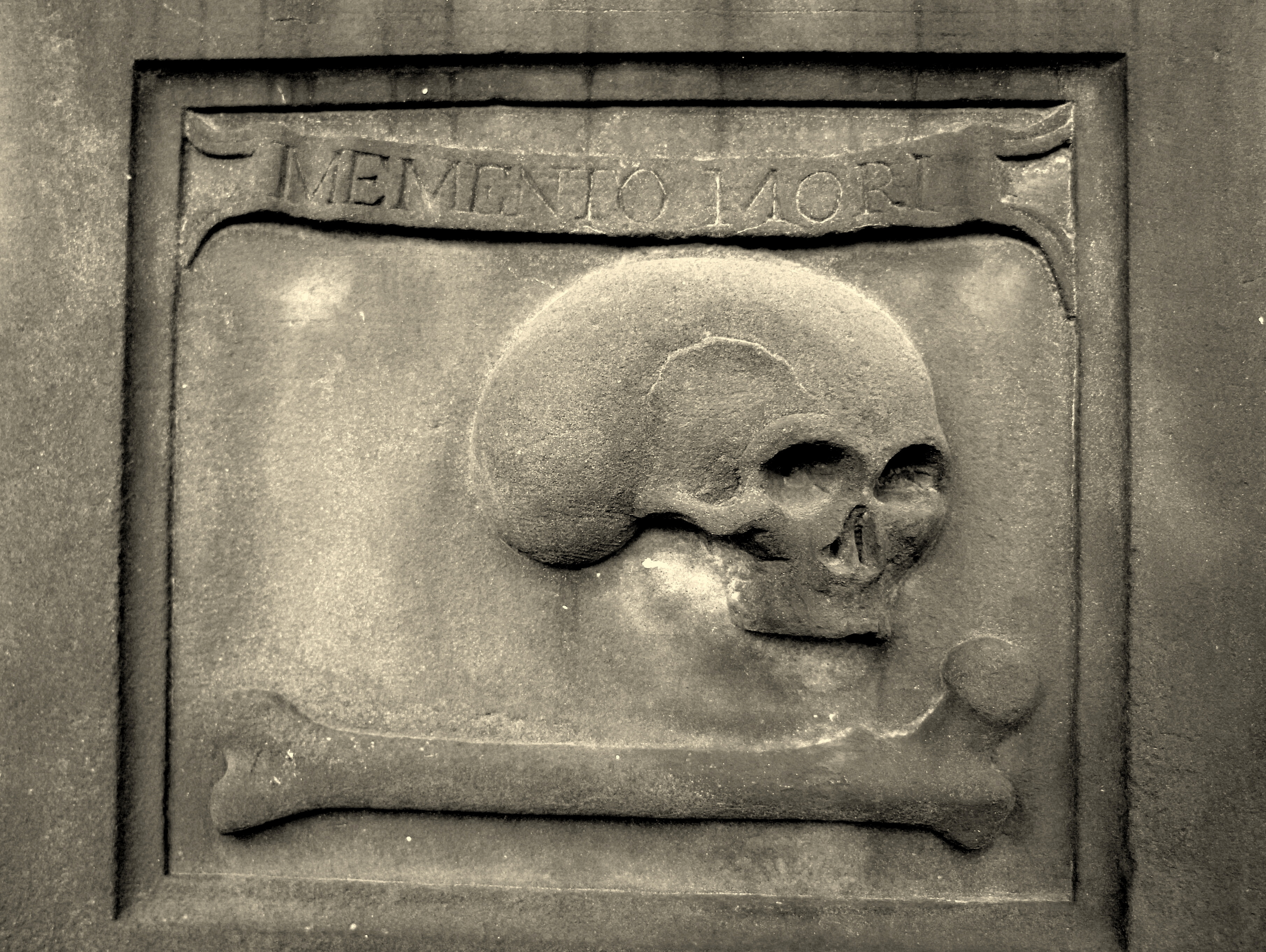
Memento mori. Gravestone inscription (1746). Edinburgh, St. Cuthbert's Churchyard.

A memento mori (Latin for "remember [that you have] to die") is an artistic symbol or trope acting as a reminder of the inevitability of death. The concept has its roots in the philosophers of classical antiquity and Christianity, and appeared in funerary art and architecture from the medieval period onwards.

The most common motif is a skull, often accompanied by bones. Often, this alone is enough to evoke the trope, but other motifs include a coffin, hourglass, or wilting flowers to signify the impermanence of life. Often, these would accompany a different central subject within a wider work, such as portraiture; however, the concept includes standalone genres such as the vanitas and Danse Macabre in visual art and cadaver monuments in sculpture.

== Pronunciation and translation ==
In English, the phrase is typically pronounced /məˈmɛntoʊ ˈmɔːri/, mə-MEN-toh MOR-ee.

Memento is the second-person singular active future imperative of meminī, 'to remember, to bear in mind', usually serving as a warning: "remember!" Morī is the present infinitive of the deponent verb morior 'to die'. Thus, the phrase literally translates as "you must remember to die" but may be loosely rendered as "remember death" or "remember that you die".

== History of the concept ==
=== In classical antiquity ===
The philosopher Democritus trained himself by going into solitude and frequenting tombs. Plato's Phaedo, where the death of Socrates is recounted, introduces the idea that the proper practice of philosophy is "about nothing else but dying and being dead".

The Stoics of classical antiquity were particularly prominent in their use of this discipline, and Seneca's letters are full of injunctions to meditate on death. The Stoic Epictetus told his students that when kissing their child, brother, or friend, they should remind themselves that they are mortal, curbing their pleasure, as do "those who stand behind men in their triumphs and remind them that they are mortal". The Stoic Marcus Aurelius invited the reader (himself) to "consider how ephemeral and mean all mortal things are" in his Meditations.

In some accounts of the Roman triumph, a companion or public slave would stand behind or near the triumphant general during the procession and remind him from time to time of his own mortality or prompt him to "look behind". Tertullian is the only ancient source to provide the complete phrase; in his Apologeticus, he recorded that the general was prompted from behind with the words Respice post te! Hominem te memento! ("Look behind you! Remember that you are a man!"). A version of this warning is often rendered into English as "Remember, Caesar, thou art mortal", for example in Fahrenheit 451.

=== In Judaism and early Christianity ===
Several passages in the Old Testament urge a remembrance of death. In Gen. 3:19b, it is written, "By the sweat of your face you shall eat bread until you return to the ground, for out of it you were taken; you are dust, and to dust you shall return." In Psalm 90, Moses prays that God would teach his people "to number our days that we may get a heart of wisdom" (Ps. 90:12). In Ecclesiastes, the Preacher insists that "It is better to go to the house of mourning than to go to the house of feasting, for this is the end of all mankind, and the living will lay it to heart" (Eccl. 7:2). In Isaiah, the lifespan of human beings is compared to the short lifespan of grass: "The grass withers, the flower fades when the breath of the Lord blows on it; surely the people are grass" (Is. 40:7).

The expression memento mori was adopted with the growth of Christianity, and came to emphasize Heaven, Hell, Hades and salvation of the soul in the afterlife.

=== In Europe from the medieval era to the Victorian era ===
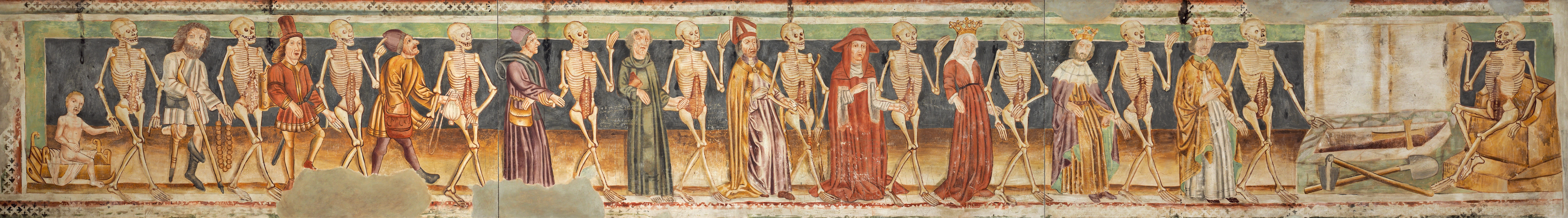
Dance of Death (replica of 15th-century fresco; National Gallery of Slovenia); Representing the universality of death regardless of class or job

==== Christian Theology ====
The thought was then utilized in Christianity, whose strong emphasis on divine judgment, heaven, hell, and the salvation of the soul brought death to the forefront of consciousness. In the Christian context, the memento mori acquires a moralizing purpose quite opposed to the nunc est bibendum ("now is the time to drink") theme of classical antiquity. To the Christian, the prospect of death serves to emphasize the emptiness and fleetingness of earthly pleasures, luxuries, and achievements, and thus also as an invitation to focus one's thoughts on the prospect of the afterlife. A biblical injunction often associated with the memento mori in this context is In omnibus operibus tuis memorare novissima tua, et in aeternum non peccabis (the Vulgate's Latin rendering of Ecclesiasticus 7:40, "in all thy works be mindful of thy last end and thou wilt never sin.") This finds ritual expression in the rites of Ash Wednesday, when ashes are placed upon the worshipers' heads with the words, "Remember, Man, that you are dust and unto dust, you shall return."

Memento mori has been an important part of ascetic disciplines as a means of perfecting the character by cultivating detachment and other virtues, and by turning the attention towards the immortality of the soul and the afterlife.

==== Architecture ====
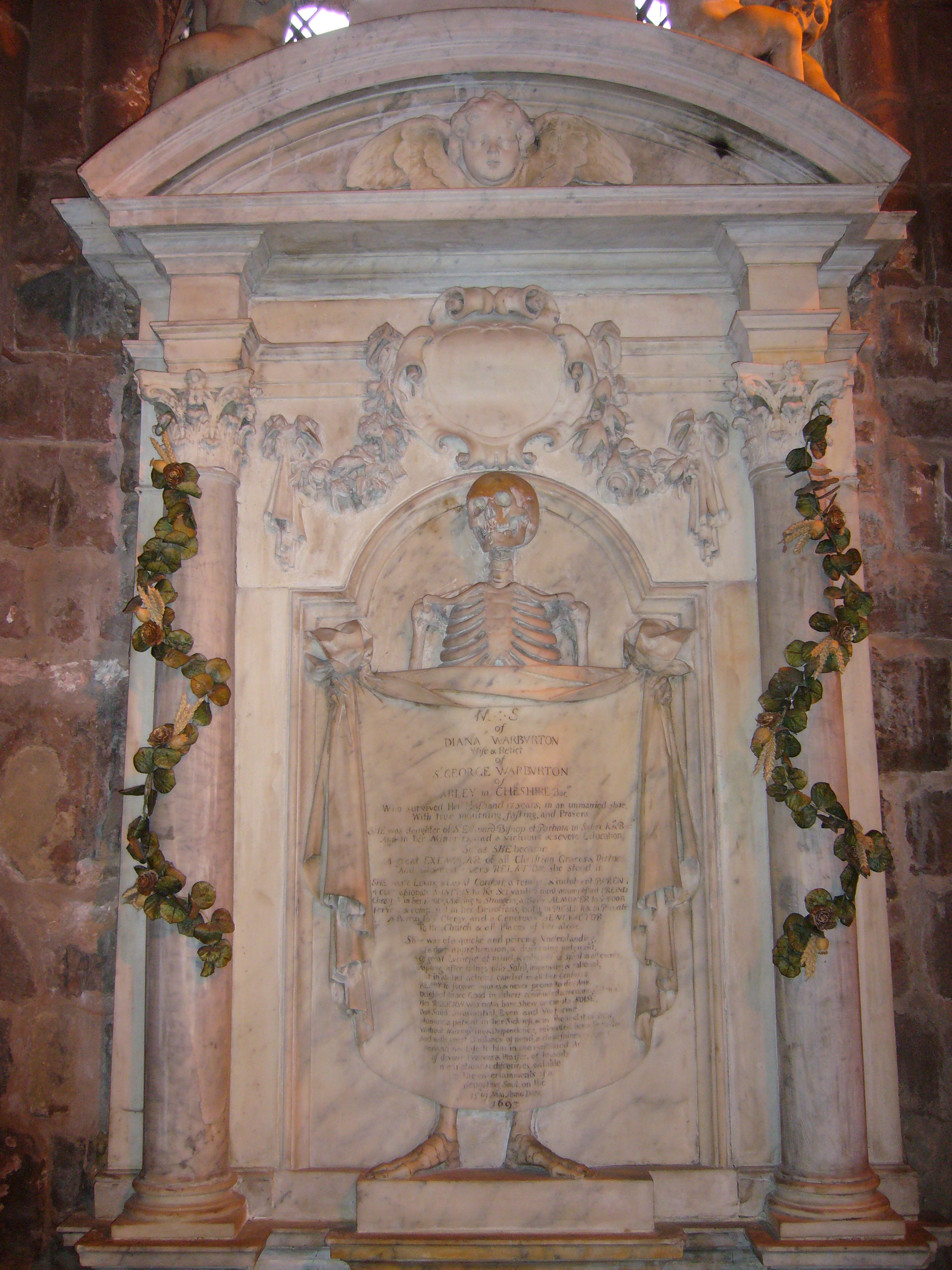
Unshrouded skeleton on Diana Warburton's tomb (dated 1693) in St John the Baptist Church, Chester

The most obvious places to look for memento mori meditations are in funeral art and architecture. Perhaps the most striking to contemporary minds is the transi or cadaver tomb, a tomb that depicts the decayed corpse of the deceased. This became a fashion in the tombs of the wealthy in the fifteenth century, and surviving examples still offer a stark reminder of the vanity of earthly riches. Later, Puritan tomb stones in the colonial United States frequently depicted winged skulls, skeletons, or angels snuffing out candles. These are among the numerous themes associated with skull imagery.

Another example of memento mori is provided by the chapels of bones, such as the Capela dos Ossos in Évora or the Capuchin Crypt in Rome. These are chapels where the walls are totally or partially covered by human remains, mostly bones. The entrance to the Capela dos Ossos has the following sentence: "We bones, lying here bare, await yours."

==== Visual art ====
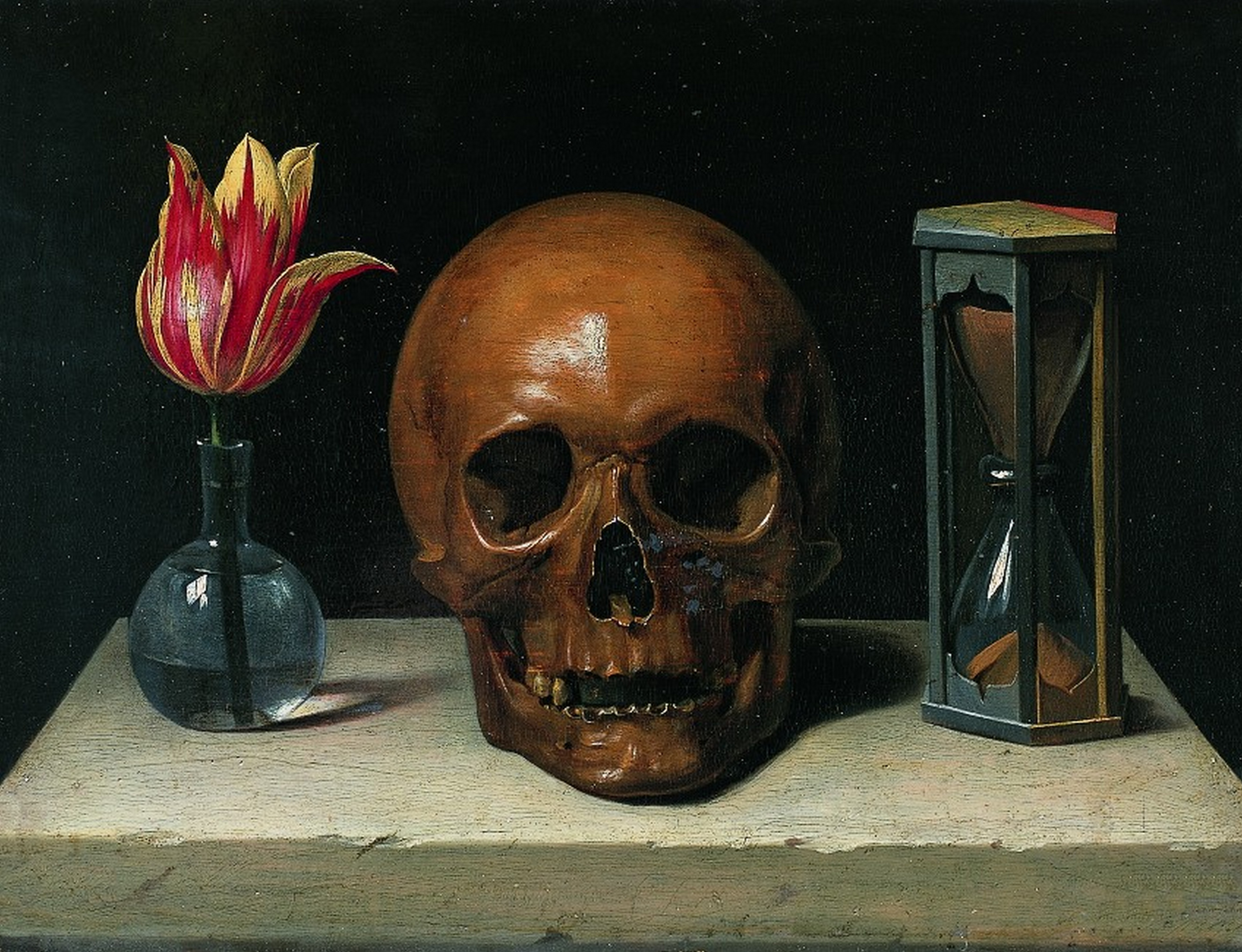
Philippe de Champaigne's Vanitas (c. 1671) is reduced to three essentials: Life, Death, and Time

Timepieces have been used to illustrate that the time of the living on Earth grows shorter with each passing minute. Public clocks would be decorated with mottos such as ultima forsan ("perhaps the last" [hour]) or vulnerant omnes, ultima necat ("they all wound, and the last kills"). Clocks have carried the motto tempus fugit ("time flies"). Old striking clocks often sported automata who would appear and strike the hour; some of the celebrated automaton clocks from Augsburg, Germany, had Death striking the hour. In the private sphere, some people carried smaller reminders of their own mortality. For example, Mary, Queen of Scots, owned a large watch carved in the form of a silver skull, embellished with the lines of Horace, "Pale death knocks with the same tempo upon the huts of the poor and the towers of Kings."

In the late 16th and through the 17th century, memento mori jewelry was popular. Items included mourning rings, pendants, lockets, and brooches. These pieces depicted tiny motifs of skulls, bones, and coffins, in addition to messages and names of the departed, picked out in precious metals and enamel.

During the same period, there emerged the artistic genre known as vanitas, Latin for "emptiness" or "vanity". Especially popular in Holland and then spreading to other European nations, vanitas paintings typically represented assemblages of numerous symbolic objects such as human skulls, guttering candles, wilting flowers, soap bubbles, butterflies, and hourglasses. In combination, vanitas assemblies conveyed the impermanence of human endeavours and of the decay that is inevitable with the passage of time.

==== Literature ====
Memento mori is also an important literary theme. Well-known literary meditations on death in English prose include Sir Thomas Browne's Hydriotaphia, Urn Burial and Jeremy Taylor's Holy Living and Holy Dying. The skull of Yorick in Shakespeare's Hamlet is also a memento mori. These works were part of a Jacobean cult of melancholia that marked the end of the Elizabethan era. In the late eighteenth century, literary elegies were a common genre; Thomas Gray's Elegy Written in a Country Churchyard and Edward Young's Night Thoughts are typical members of the genre.

In the European devotional literature of the Renaissance, the Ars Moriendi, memento mori had moral value by reminding individuals of their mortality.

==== Music ====
Apart from the genre of requiem and funeral music, there is also a rich tradition of memento mori in the Early Music of Europe. Especially those facing the ever-present death during the recurring bubonic plague pandemics from the 1340s onward tried to toughen themselves by anticipating the inevitable in chants, from the simple Geisslerlieder of the Flagellant movement to the more refined cloistral or courtly songs. The lyrics often looked at life as a necessary and God-given vale of tears with death as a ransom, and they reminded people to lead sinless lives to stand a chance at Judgment Day. The following two Latin stanzas (with their English translations) are typical of memento mori in medieval music; they are from the virelai Ad Mortem Festinamus of the Llibre Vermell de Montserrat from 1399:

Vita brevis breviter in brevi finietur,
Mors venit velociter quae neminem veretur,
Omnia mors perimit et nulli miseretur.
Ad mortem festinamus peccare desistamus.

Ni conversus fueris et sicut puer factus
Et vitam mutaveris in meliores actus,
Intrare non poteris regnum Dei beatus.
Ad mortem festinamus peccare desistamus.

Translation:

Life is short, and shortly it will end;
Death comes quickly and respects no one,
Death destroys everything and takes pity on no one.
To death we are hastening, let us refrain from sinning.

If you do not turn back and become like a child,
And change your life for the better,
You will not be able to enter, blessed, the Kingdom of God.
To death we are hastening, let us refrain from sinning.

==== Danse macabre ====
The danse macabre is another well-known example of the memento mori theme, with its dancing depiction of the Grim Reaper carrying off rich and poor alike. This and similar depictions of Death decorated many European churches.

==== Gallery ====
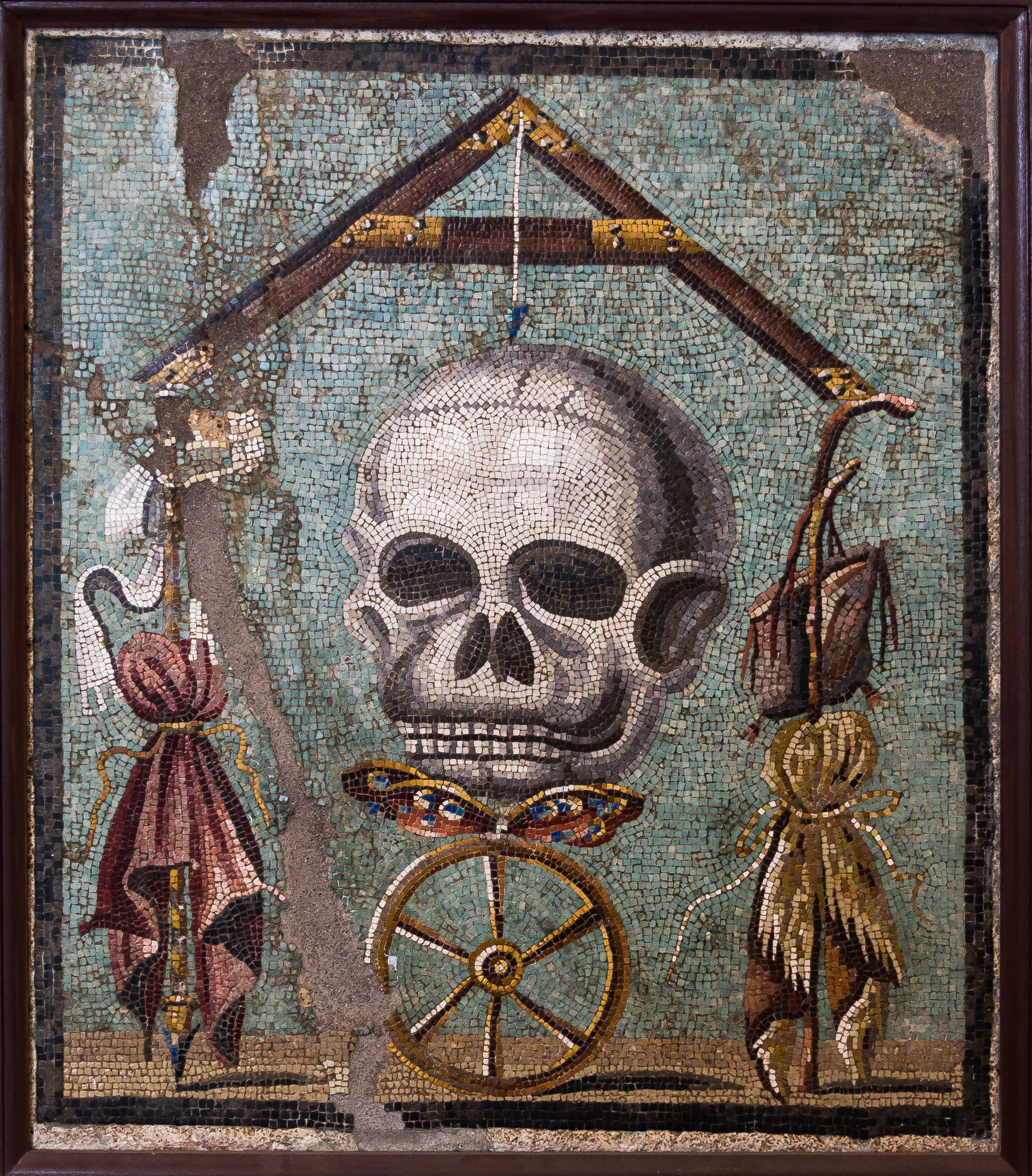
Roman mosaic representing the Wheel of Fortune which, as it turns, can make the rich poor and the poor rich; in effect, both states are very precarious, with death never far and life hanging by a thread: when it breaks, the soul flies off. And thus all are made equal. (Collezioni pompeiane. Museo Archeologico Nazionale di Napoli)

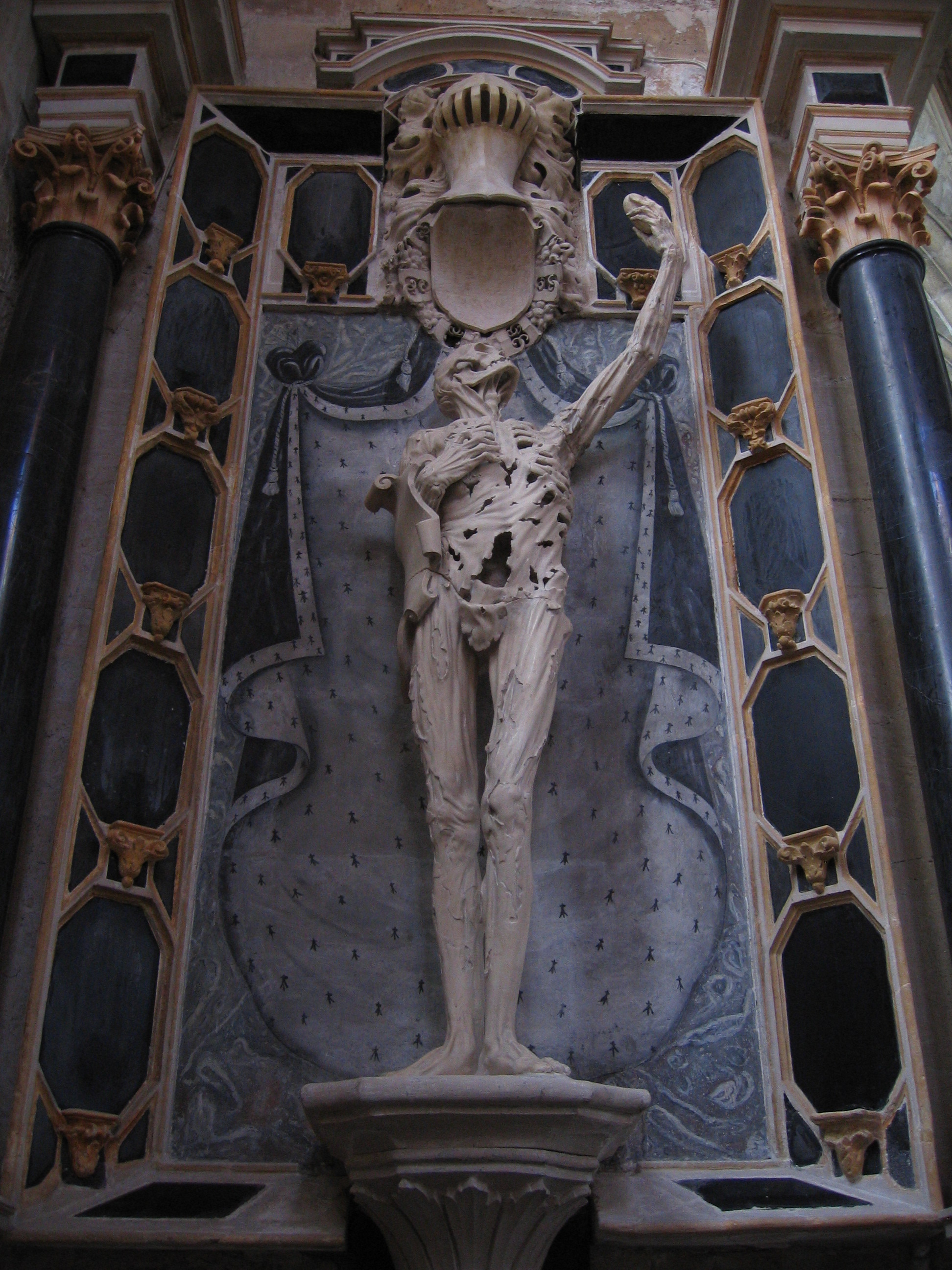
Prince of Orange René of Châlon died in 1544 at age 25. His widow commissioned sculptor Ligier Richier to represent him in the Cadaver Tomb of René of Chalon, which shows him offering his heart to God, set against the painted splendour of his former worldly estate. (Church of Saint-Étienne, Bar-le-Duc)

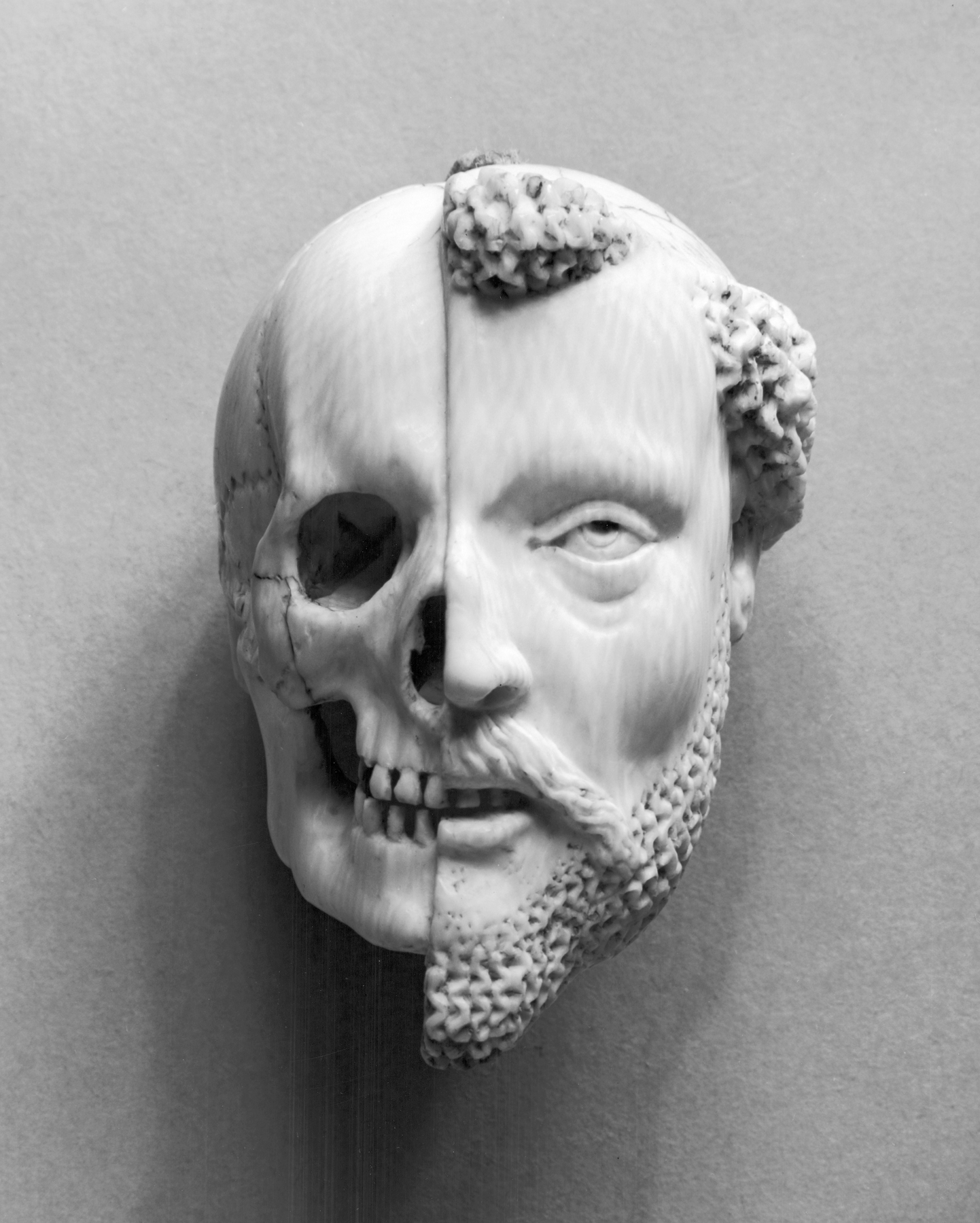
French 16th/17th-century ivory pendant, Monk and Death, recalling mortality and the certainty of death (Walters Art Museum)

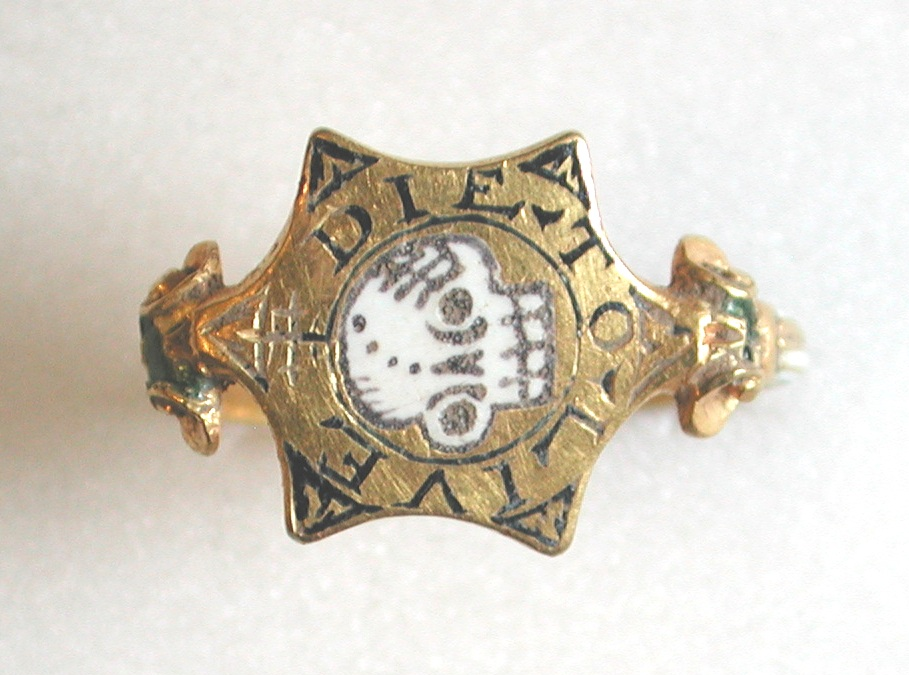
Memento mori ring, with enameled skull and "Die to Live" message (between 1500 and 1650, British Museum, London)

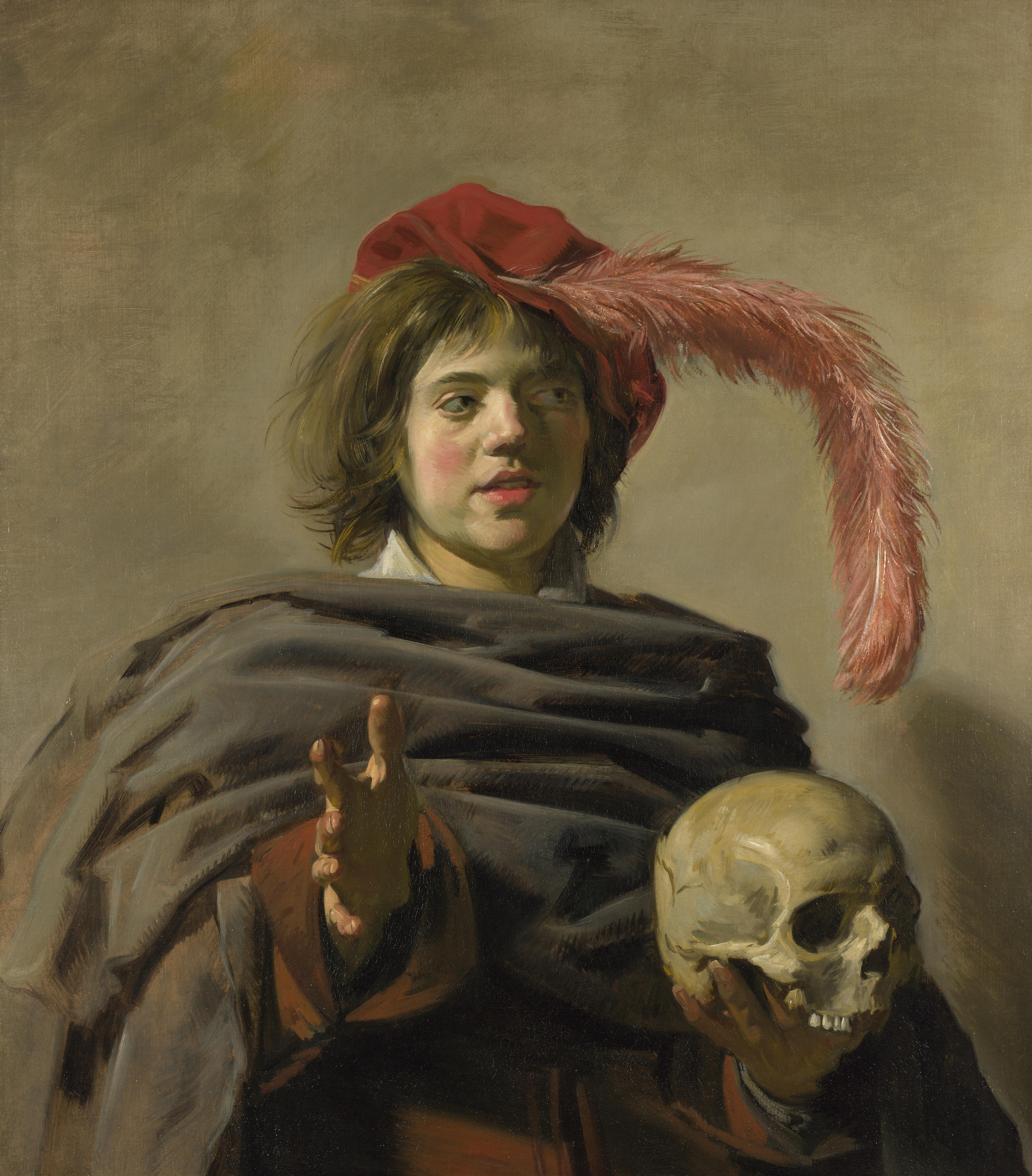
Frans Hals, Young Man with a Skull, c. 1626–1628

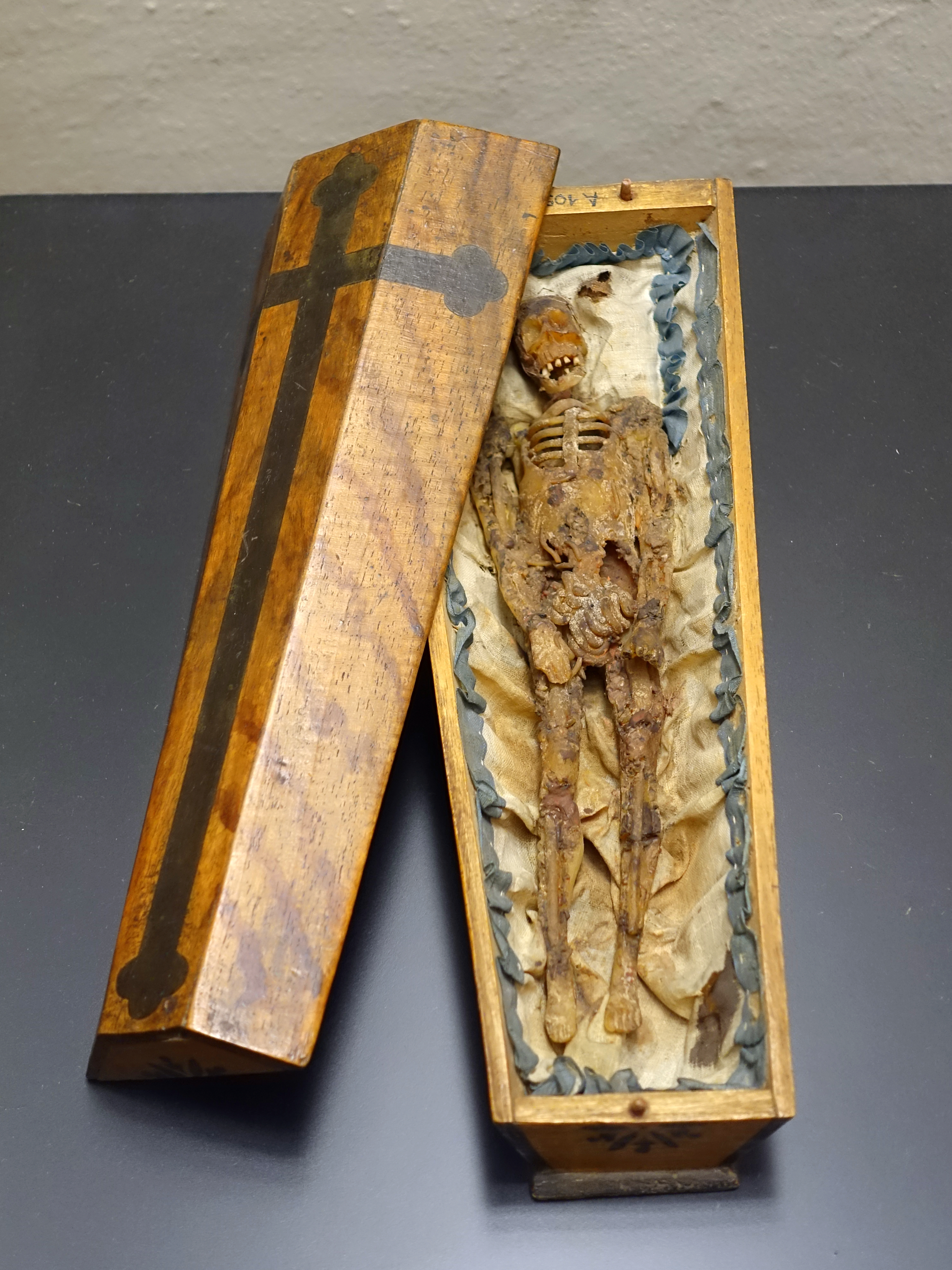
Memento mori in the form of a small coffin, 1700s, wax figure on silk in a wooden coffin (Museum Schnütgen, Cologne, Germany)

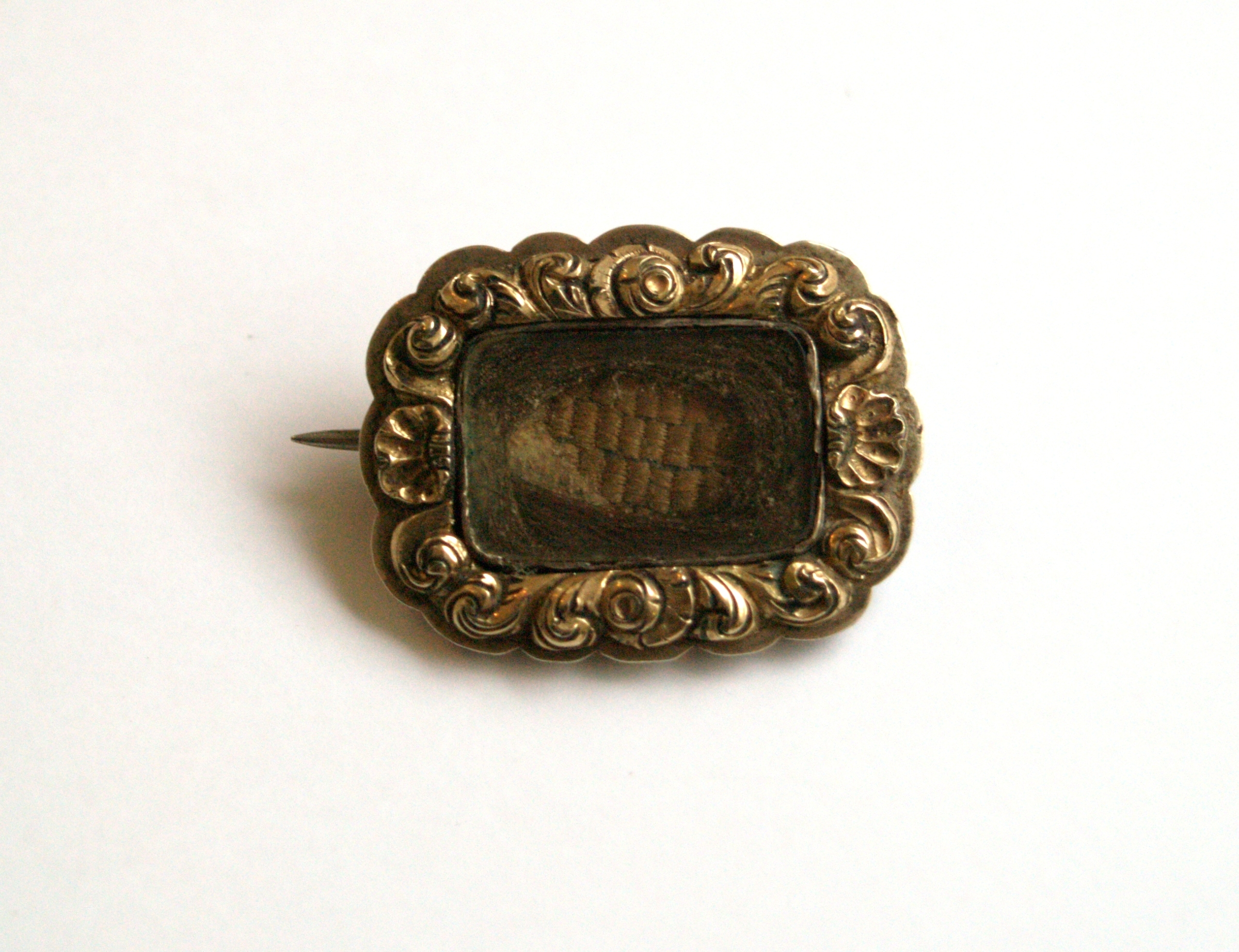
Mourning brooch with plaited hair, 1843 (Auckland War Memorial Museum Tāmaki Paenga Hira, New Zealand)

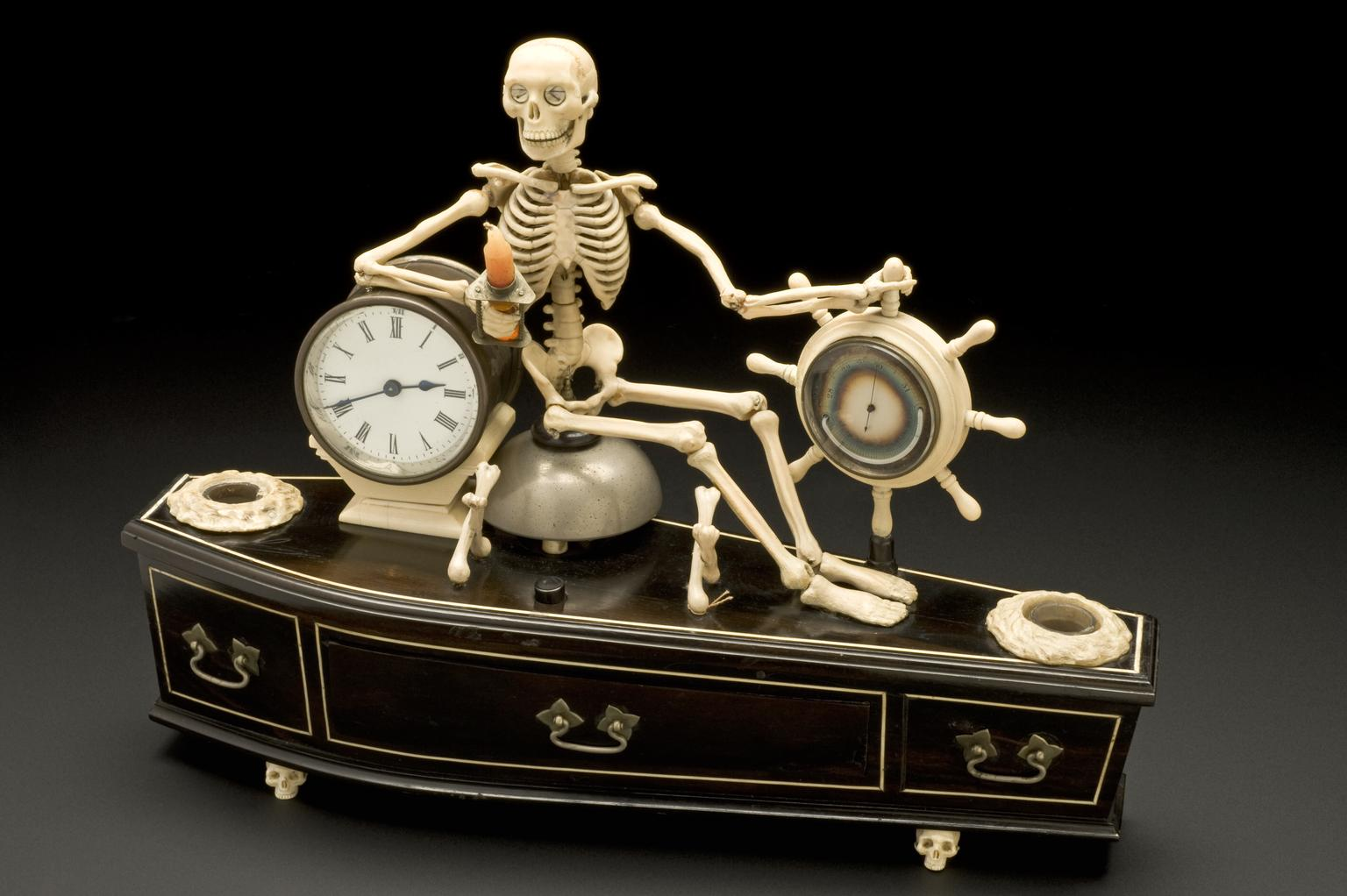
Alarm clock, mounted on model of coffin, probably English, 1840–1900 (Science Museum, London)

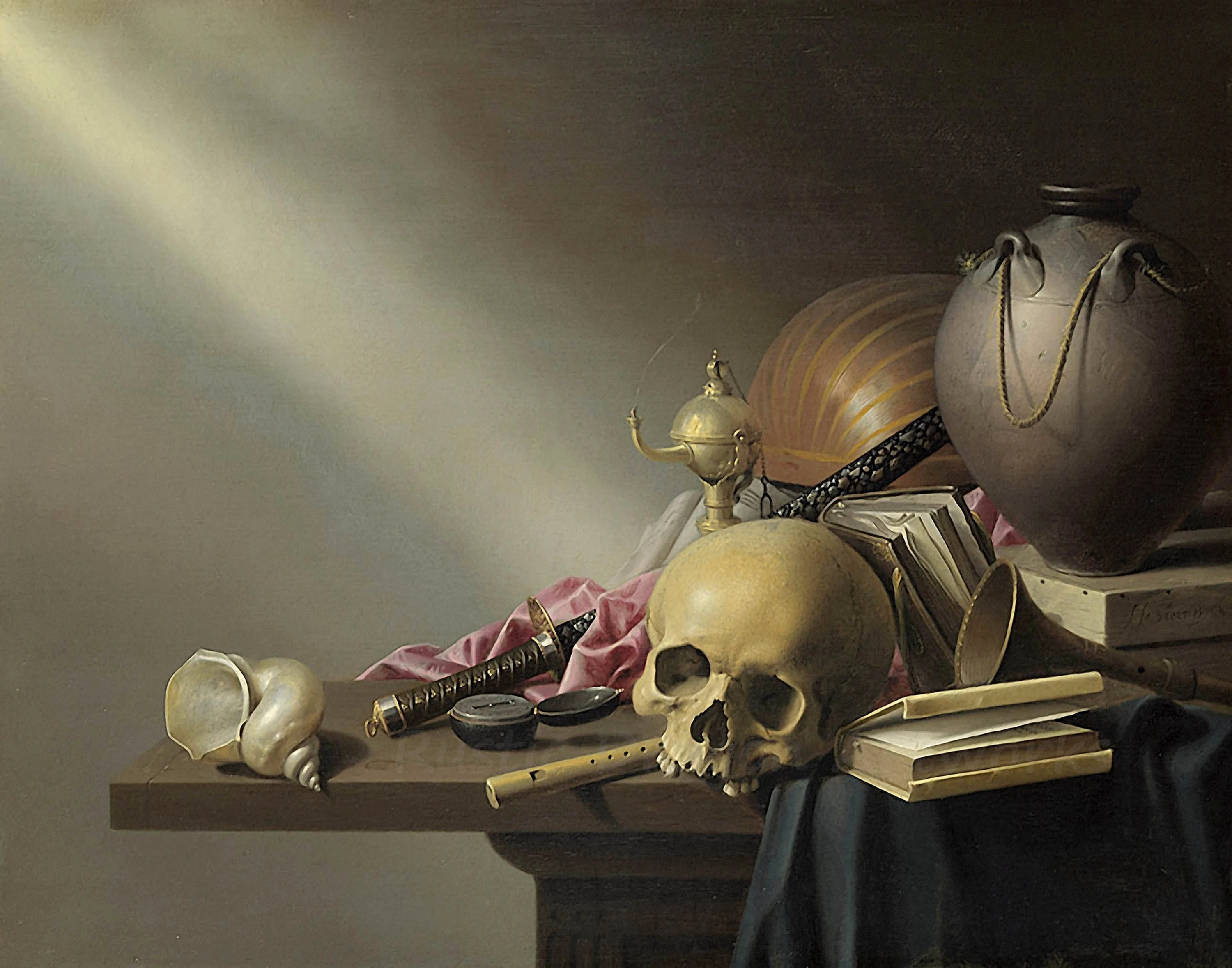
Still Life: An Allegory of the Vanities of Human Life is a Dutch vanitas which follows the memento mori theme.

Hans Holbein's The Ambassadors includes a distorted image of a skull across the bottom of the painting.

=== The salutation of the Hermits of St. Paul of France ===
Memento mori was the salutation used by the Hermits of St. Paul of France (1620–1633), also known as the Brothers of Death. It is sometimes claimed that the Trappists use this salutation, but this is not true.

=== In Puritan America ===
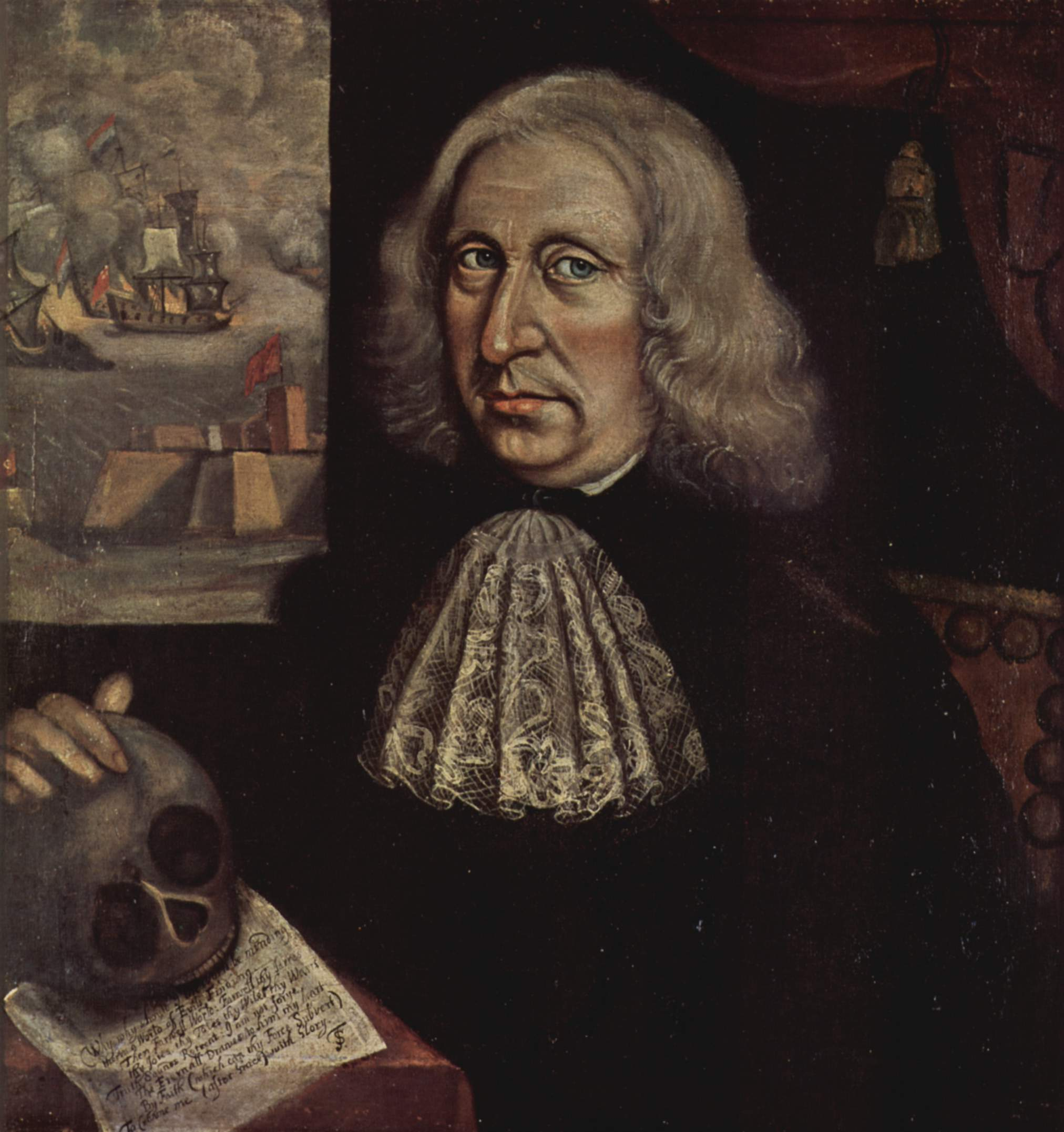
Thomas Smith's Self-Portrait

Colonial American art saw a large number of memento mori images due to Puritan influence. The Puritan community in 17th-century North America looked down upon art because they believed that it drew the faithful away from God and, if away from God, then it could only lead to the devil. However, portraits were considered historical records and, as such, they were allowed. Thomas Smith, a 17th-century Puritan, fought in many naval battles and also painted. In his self-portrait, we see these pursuits represented alongside a typical Puritan memento mori with a skull, suggesting his awareness of imminent death.

The poem underneath the skull emphasizes Thomas Smith's acceptance of death and of turning away from the world of the living:

Why why should I the World be minding, Therein a World of Evils Finding. Then Farwell World: Farwell thy jarres, thy Joies thy Toies thy Wiles thy Warrs. Truth Sounds Retreat: I am not sorye. The Eternall Drawes to him my heart, By Faith (which can thy Force Subvert) To Crowne me (after Grace) with Glory.

=== Mexico's Day of the Dead ===
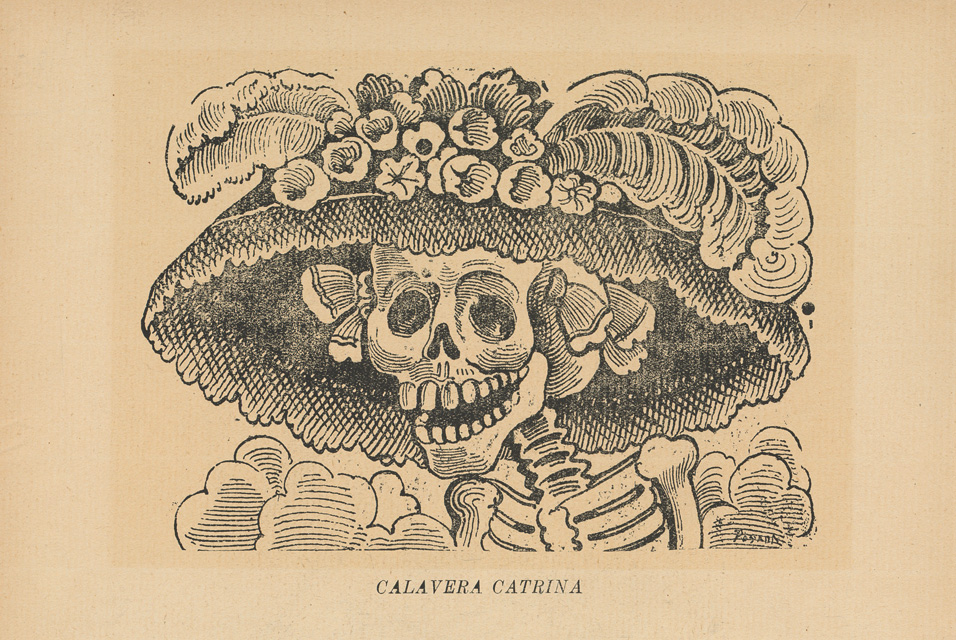
Posada's 1910 La Calavera Catrina

Much memento mori art is associated with the Mexican festival Day of the Dead, including skull-shaped candies and bread loaves adorned with bread "bones".

This theme was also famously expressed in the works of the Mexican engraver José Guadalupe Posada, in which people from various walks of life are depicted as skeletons.

Another manifestation of memento mori is found in the Mexican "Calavera", a literary composition in verse form normally written in honour of a person who is still alive, but written as if that person were dead. These compositions have a comedic tone and are often offered from one friend to another during Day of the Dead.

=== Contemporary culture ===
Roman Krznaric suggests memento mori is an important topic to bring back into our thoughts and belief system; "Philosophers have come up with lots of what I call 'death tasters' – thought experiments for seizing the day."

These thought experiments are powerful to get us re-oriented back to death into current awareness and living with spontaneity. Albert Camus stated "Come to terms with death, thereafter anything is possible." Jean-Paul Sartre expressed that life is given to us early, and is shortened at the end, all the while taken away at every step of the way, emphasizing that the end is only the beginning every day.

== Similar concepts across cultures ==
=== In Buddhism ===
The Buddhist practice maraṇasati meditates on death. The word is a Pāli compound of maraṇa 'death' (an Indo-European cognate of Latin mori) and sati 'awareness', so very close to memento mori. It is first used in early Buddhist texts, the suttapiṭaka of the Pāli Canon, with parallels in the āgamas of the "Northern" Schools.

=== In Japanese Zen and samurai culture ===
In Japan, the influence of Zen Buddhist contemplation of death on indigenous culture can be gauged by the following quotation from the classic treatise on samurai ethics, Hagakure:

The Way of the Samurai is, morning after morning, the practice of death, considering whether it will be here or be there, imagining the most sightly way of dying, and putting one's mind firmly in death. Although this may be a most difficult thing, if one will do it, it can be done. There is nothing that one should suppose cannot be done.

In the annual appreciation of cherry blossom and fall colors, hanami and momijigari, it was philosophized that things are most splendid at the moment before their fall, and to aim to live and die in a similar fashion.

=== In Tibetan Buddhism ===
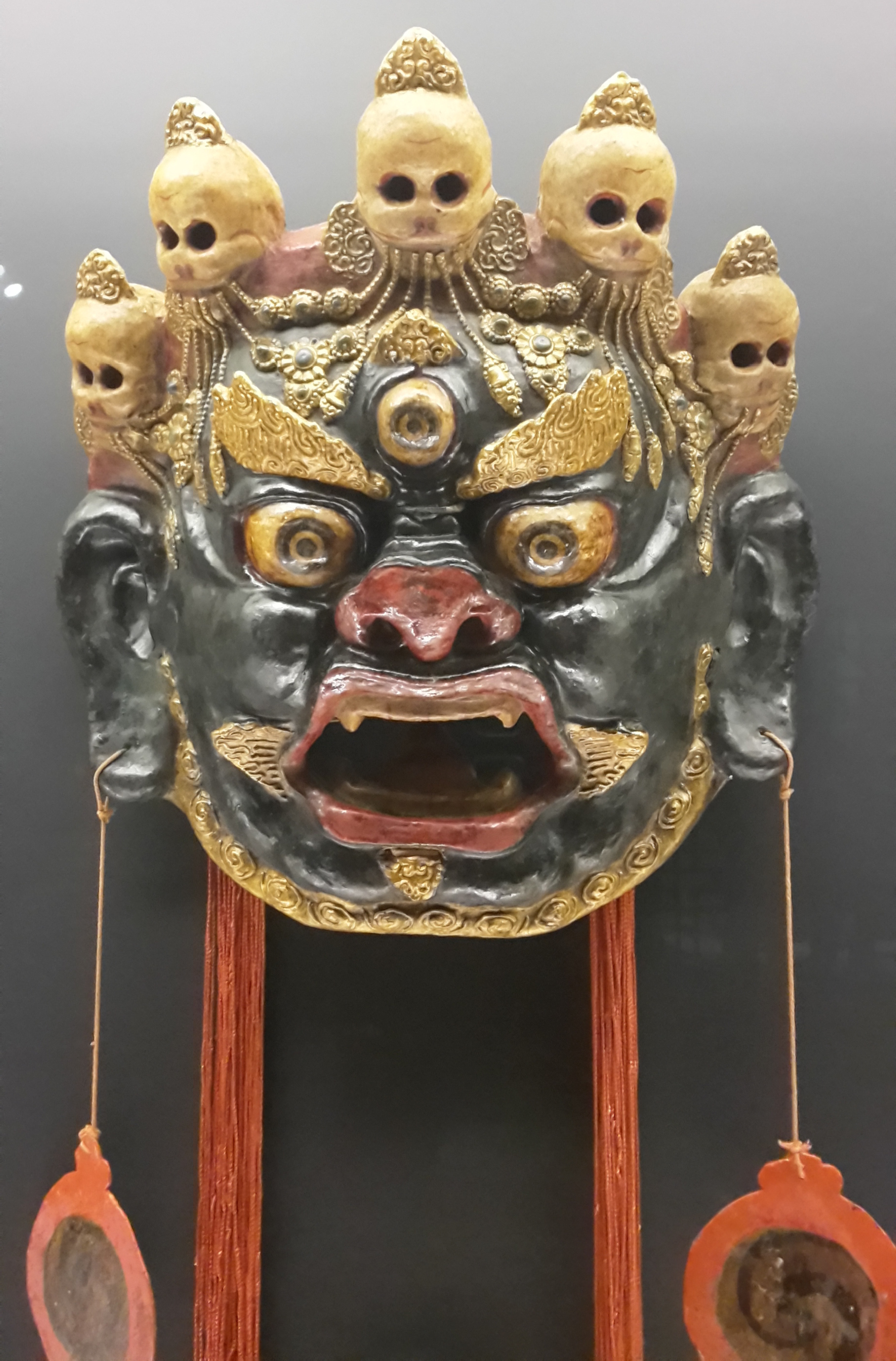
Tibetan Citipati mask depicting Mahākāla. The skull mask of Citipati is a reminder of the impermanence of life and the eternal cycle of life and death.

In Tibetan Buddhism, there is a mind training practice known as Lojong. The initial stages of the classic Lojong begin with 'The Four Thoughts that Turn the Mind', or, more literally, 'Four Contemplations to Cause a Revolution in the Mind'. The second of these four is the contemplation on impermanence and death. In particular, one contemplates that;

- All compounded things are impermanent.
- The human body is a compounded thing.
- Therefore, death of the body is certain.
- The time of death is uncertain and beyond our control.

There are a number of classic verse formulations of these contemplations. It is believed that through this practice we can overcome the strong habitual tendency to live as though we will certainly not die today.

==== Lalitavistara Sutra ====
The following is from the Lalitavistara Sūtra, a major work in the classical Sanskrit canon:

ज्वलितं त्रिभवं जरव्याधिदुखैः मरणाग्निप्रदीप्तमनाथमिदम्।
भवनि शरणे सद मूढ जगत् भ्रमती भ्रमरो यथ कुम्भगतो॥

अध्रुवं त्रिभवं शरदभ्रनिभं नटरङ्गसमा जगिर् ऊर्मिच्युती।
गिरिनद्यसमं लघुशीघ्रजवं व्रजतायु जगे यथ विद्यु नभे॥

Translation:

Beings are ablaze with the sufferings of sickness and old age,
And with no defence against the conflagration of Death
The bewildered, seeking refuge in worldly existence
Spin round and round, like bees trapped in a jar.

The three worlds are fleeting like autumn clouds.
Like a staged performance, beings come and go.
In tumultuous waves, rushing by, like rapids over a cliff.
Like lightning, wanderers in samsara burst into existence, and are gone in a flash.

==== The Udānavarga ====
A very well-known verse in the Pali, Sanskrit and Tibetan canons states [this is from the Sanskrit version, the Udānavarga]:

सर्वे क्षयान्ता निचयाः पतनान्ताः समुच्छ्रयाः |
सम्योगा विप्रयोगान्ता मरणान्तं हि जीवितम् |1,22|

Translation:

All that is acquired will be lost
What rises will fall
Where there is meeting there will be separation
What is born will surely die.

==== Shantideva, Bodhicaryavatara ====
Shantideva, in the Bodhisattvacaryāvatāra 'Bodhisattva's Way of Life' reflects at length:

कृताकृतापरीक्षोऽयं मृत्युर्विश्रम्भघातकः।
स्वस्थास्वस्थैरविश्वास्य आकमिस्मकमहाशनि:॥
२/३४॥

अप्रिया न भविष्यन्ति प्रियो मे न भविष्यति।
अहं च न भविष्यामि सर्वं च न भविष्यति॥
२/३७॥

तत्तत्स्मरणताम याति यद्यद्वस्त्वनुभयते।
स्वप्नानुभूतवत्सर्वं गतं न पूनरीक्ष्यते॥
२/३६॥

रात्रिन्दिवमविश्राममायुषो वर्धते व्ययः।
आयस्य चागमो नास्ति न मरिष्यामि किं न्वहम्॥
२/४०

यमदूतैर्गृहीतस्य कुतो बन्धुः कुतः सुह्रत्। पुण्यमेकं तदा त्राणं मया तच्च न सेवितम्॥
२/४१॥

Translation:

Death does not differentiate between tasks done and undone.
This traitor is not to be trusted by the healthy or the ill,
for it is like an unexpected, great thunderbolt.
BCA 2.33

My enemies will not remain, nor will my friends remain.
I shall not remain. Nothing will remain.
BCA 2:35

Whatever is experienced will fade to a memory.
Like an experience in a dream,
everything that has passed will not be seen again.
BCA 2:36

Day and night, a life span unceasingly diminishes,
and there is no adding onto it. Shall I not die then?
BCA 2:39

For a person seized by the messengers of Death,
what good is a relative and what good is a friend?
At that time, merit alone is a protection,
and I have not applied myself to it.
BCA 2:41

==== In more modern Tibetan Buddhist works ====
In a practice text written by the 19th-century Tibetan master Dudjom Lingpa for serious meditators, he formulates the second contemplation in this way:

On this occasion when you have such a bounty of opportunities in terms of your body, environment, friends, spiritual mentors, time, and practical instructions, without procrastinating until tomorrow and the next day, arouse a sense of urgency, as if a spark landed on your body or a grain of sand fell in your eye. If you have not swiftly applied yourself to practice, examine the births and deaths of other beings and reflect again and again on the unpredictability of your lifespan and the time of your death, and on the uncertainty of your own situation. Meditate on this until you have definitively integrated it with your mind... The appearances of this life, including your surroundings and friends, are like last night's dream, and this life passes more swiftly than a flash of lightning in the sky. There is no end to this meaningless work. What a joke to prepare to live forever! Wherever you are born in the heights or depths of saṃsāra, the great noose of suffering will hold you tight. Acquiring freedom for yourself is as rare as a star in the daytime, so how is it possible to practice and achieve liberation? The root of all mind training and practical instructions is planted by knowing the nature of existence. There is no other way. I, an old vagabond, have shaken my beggar's satchel, and this is what came out.

The contemporary Tibetan master, Yangthang Rinpoche, in his short text 'Summary of the View, Meditation, and Conduct':

།ཁྱེད་རྙེད་དཀའ་བ་མི་ཡི་ལུས་རྟེན་རྙེད། །སྐྱེ་དཀའ་བའི་ངེས་འབྱུང་གི་བསམ་པ་སྐྱེས། །མཇལ་དཀའ་བའི་མཚན་ལྡན་གྱི་བླ་མ་མཇལ། །འཕྲད་དཀའ་བ་དམ་པའི་ཆོས་དང་འཕྲད།
འདི་འདྲ་བའི་ལུས་རྟེན་བཟང་པོ་འདི། །ཐོབ་དཀའ་བའི་ཚུལ་ལ་ཡང་ཡང་སོམ། རྙེད་པ་འདི་དོན་ཡོད་མ་བྱས་ན། །འདི་མི་རྟག་རླུང་གསེབ་མར་མེ་འདྲ།
ཡུན་རིང་པོའི་བློ་གཏད་འདི་ལ་མེད། །ཤི་བར་དོར་གྲོལ་བའི་གདེངས་མེད་ན། །ཚེ་ཕྱི་མའི་སྡུག་བསྔལ་ཨ་རེ་འཇིགས། །མཐའ་མེད་པའི་འཁོར་བར་འཁྱམས་དགོས་ཚེ།
།འདིའི་རང་བཞིན་བསམ་ན་སེམས་རེ་སྐྱོ། །ཚེ་འདི་ལ་བློ་གདེངས་ཐོབ་པ་ཞིག །ཅི་ནས་ཀྱང་མཛད་རྒྱུ་བཀའ་དྲིན་ཆེ། །འདི་བདག་གིས་ཁྱོད་ལ་རེ་བ་ཡིན།

Translation:

You have obtained a human life, which is difficult to find,
Have aroused an intention of a spirit of emergence, which is difficult to arouse,
Have met a qualified guru, who is difficult to meet,
And you have encountered the sublime Dharma, which is difficult to encounter.
Reflect again and again on the difficulty Of obtaining such a fine human life.
If you do not make this meaningful,
It will be like a butter lamp in the wind of impermanence.
Do not count on this lasting a long time.

The Tibetan Canon also includes copious materials on the meditative preparation for the death process and intermediate period bardo between death and rebirth. Amongst them are the famous "Tibetan Book of the Dead", in Tibetan Bardo Thodol, the "Natural Liberation through Hearing in the Bardo".

=== In Islam ===
The "remembrance of death" (Arabic: تذكرة الموت, Tadhkirat al-Mawt; deriving from تذكرة, tadhkirah, Arabic for memorandum or admonition), has been a major topic of Islamic spirituality since the time of the Islamic prophet Muhammad in Medina. It is grounded in the Qur'an, where there are recurring injunctions to pay heed to the fate of previous generations. The hadith literature, which preserves the teachings of Muhammad, records advice for believers to "remember often death, the destroyer of pleasures." Some Sufis have been called "ahl al-qubur," the "people of the graves," because of their practice of frequenting graveyards to ponder on mortality and the vanity of life, based on the teaching of Muhammad to visit graves. Al-Ghazali devotes to this topic the last book of his "The Revival of the Religious Sciences".

=== Scandinavia ===
The Hávamál ("Sayings of the High One"), a 13th-century norse compilation poetically attributed to the god Odin, includes two sections – the Gestaþáttr and the Loddfáfnismál – offering many gnomic proverbs expressing the memento mori philosophy, most famously Gestaþáttr number 77:

Deyr fé,
deyja frændur,
deyr sjálfur ið sama;
ek veit einn at aldri deyr,
dómr um dauðan hvern.

Translation:

Animals die,
friends die,
and thyself, too, shall die;
but one thing I know that never dies
the tales of the one who died.

== See also ==
- Gerascophobia (fear of aging)
- Gerontophobia (fear of elderly people)
- Carpe diem
- La Calavera Catrina
- Mono no aware
- Nine stages of decay
- Mortality salience
- Sic transit gloria mundi
- Tempus fugit
- Terror management theory
- Ubi sunt
- Vanitas
- YOLO (aphorism)
