= Thomas Smith (American painter) =

American painter, sailor and slave trader (c. 1650 – 1691)

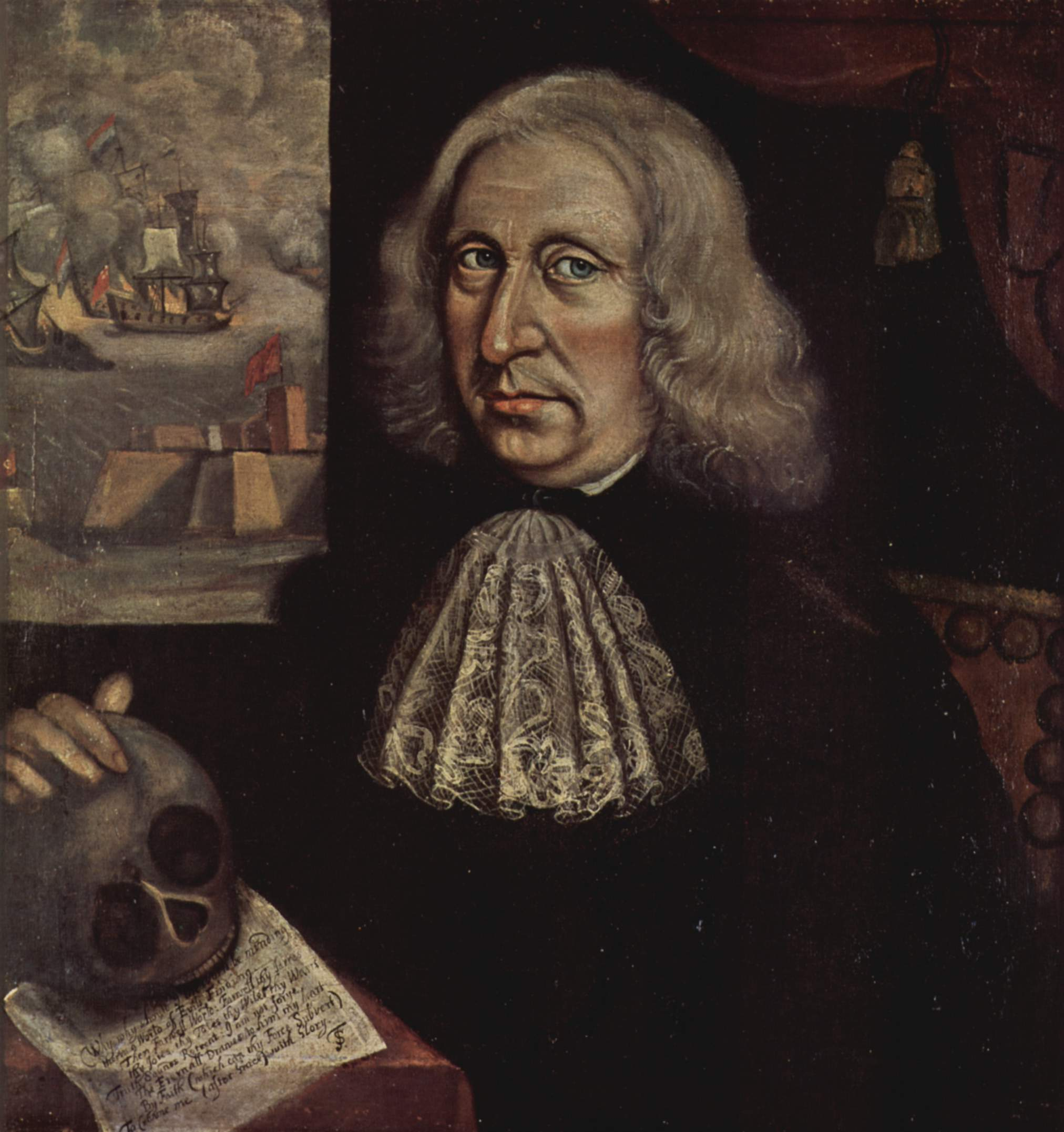
Self-portrait of Smith (c. 1680), Worcester Art Museum

Thomas Smith (c. 1650 – c. 1691) was an artist, sailor and slave trader in colonial New England. Smith is best known for the self-portrait that he painted c. 1680, which according to the Worcester Art Museum, is "the only seventeenth-century New England portrait by an identified artist and the earliest extant American self-portrait." Smith was also a prominent Boston merchant and slave trader who engaged in the enslavement of Native Americans during King Philip's War.

== Life ==
Little is known about Smith's early life in Boston. In the mid-1670s, around the time of King Philip's War, Smith was actively engaged in the slave trade. Many of the trades were recorded by Massachusetts Bay Colony treasurer John Hull, who was charged with handling captured Native Americans from the war. Smith purchased 29 Native Americans as slaves in August and 41 captives in September 1676, who were subsequently sold in European and African slave markets.

Smith is believed to be the same Thomas Smith who was commissioned by Harvard College on 2 June 1680 to produce a portrait of the Puritan theologian William Ames. Because several Thomas Smiths were active in Boston in the late seventeenth century, it is very difficult to identify other contemporary references to persons of that name with the artist. Smith is assumed to have been a mariner and a Puritan based on his self-portrait, which can be traced back to Smith's granddaughter, Catherina Mears Dexter (1701–1797).

== Self-portrait ==
=== Portrait ===
Smith's style has similarities with English and Dutch Golden Age painting, such as his expressive use of light and shadow. The sitter is shown seated on a chair with maroon upholstery and studs. Smith wears a typically Puritan dark coat and lace jabot. A maroon curtain and golden tassel appear in the top-right corner, lending a sense of depth to the portrait. From a window in the top-left corner is depicted a naval battle between Dutch and English forces and an unidentified enemy. Beneath them, a fortification is shown flying two red flags, one of which has three white crescents. The image may well refer to a significant event in Smith's career. The skull, a memento mori, has unrealistically round eye sockets like those found on contemporary funerary engravings in New England.

=== Poem ===
Beneath the skull in the bottom-left corner is a piece of paper that contains an eight-line poem:

Why why should I the World be minding
therin a World of Evils Finding.
Then Farwell World: Farwell thy Jarres
thy Joies thy Toies thy Wiles thy Warrs
Truth Sounds Retreat: I am not ſorye.
The Eternal Drawes to him my heart
By Faith (which can thy Force Subvert)
To Crowne me (after Grace) with Glory.
T.S.

The monogram T. S. led critics to assume that Smith composed the verses, which describe the speaker's resignation from the world's troubles in order to seek divine solace. In fact, the poem is Josuah Sylvester's translation of a French devotional poem by Simon Goulart. Roger B. Stein finds that 'the poem is the central organizing element, the key to the picture—to its design, to the relationship of its parts to one another, and to its meaning both as individual work and as an artefact within its larger culture'.

== Other works ==
Five other portraits have been attributed to Smith. Major Thomas Savage (1679) and Mrs Richard Patteshall and Child (1679) are both owned by the Museum of Fine Arts, Boston. Captain Richard Patteshall (private collection) was meant to hang with the portrait of his wife. Captain George Curwin (c. 1675) is owned by the Peabody Essex Museum in Salem, Massachusetts. The sitter of Portrait of a Man, probably Sir George Downing (1624–1684) has also been identified as Elisha Hutchinson.

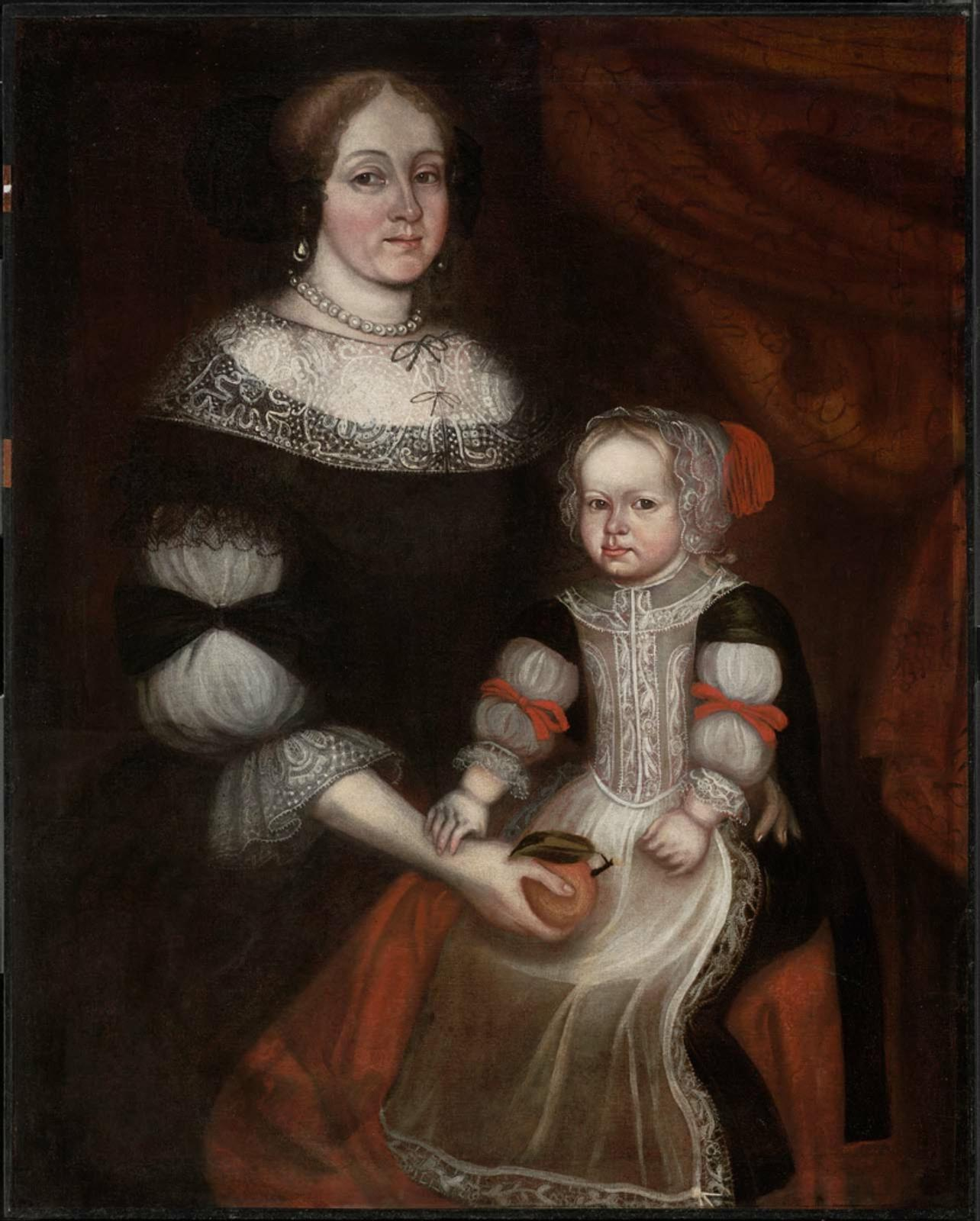
Mrs. Richard Patteshall (Martha Woody) and Child (1679), Museum of Fine Arts, Boston

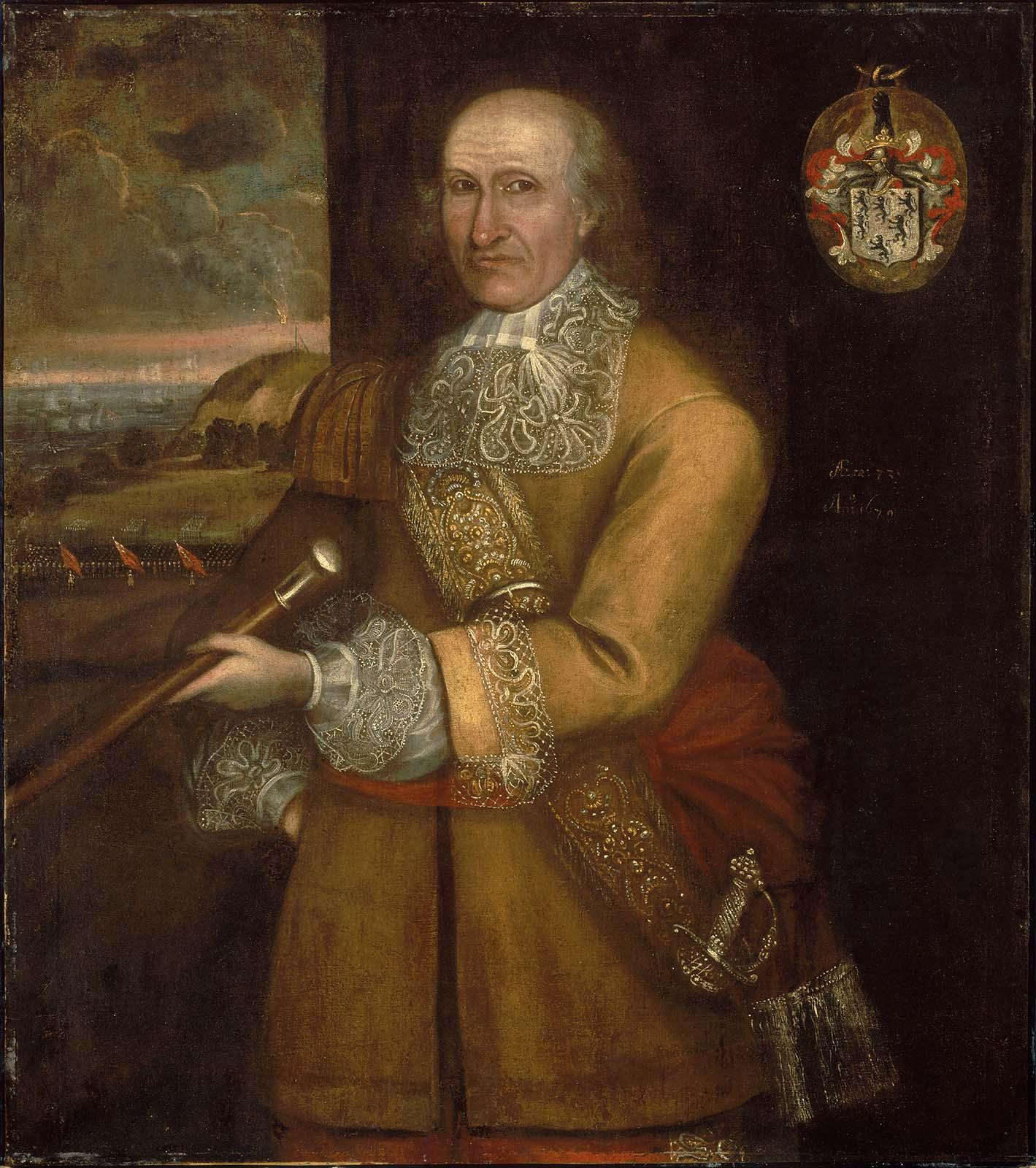
Major Thomas Savage (1679), Museum of Fine Arts, Boston

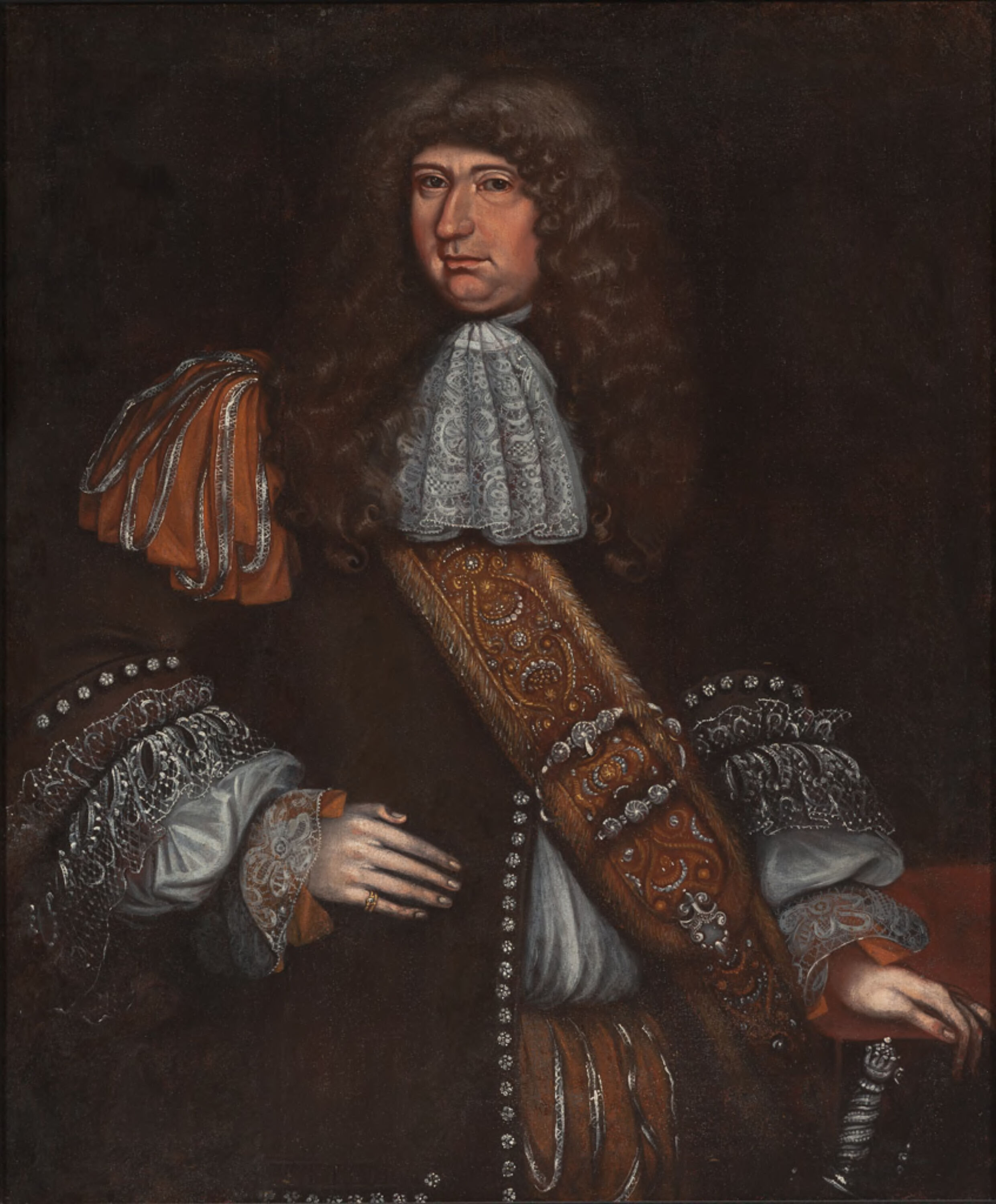
Portrait of a Man, probably Sir George Downing (c. 1675–1690), Harvard Art Museums

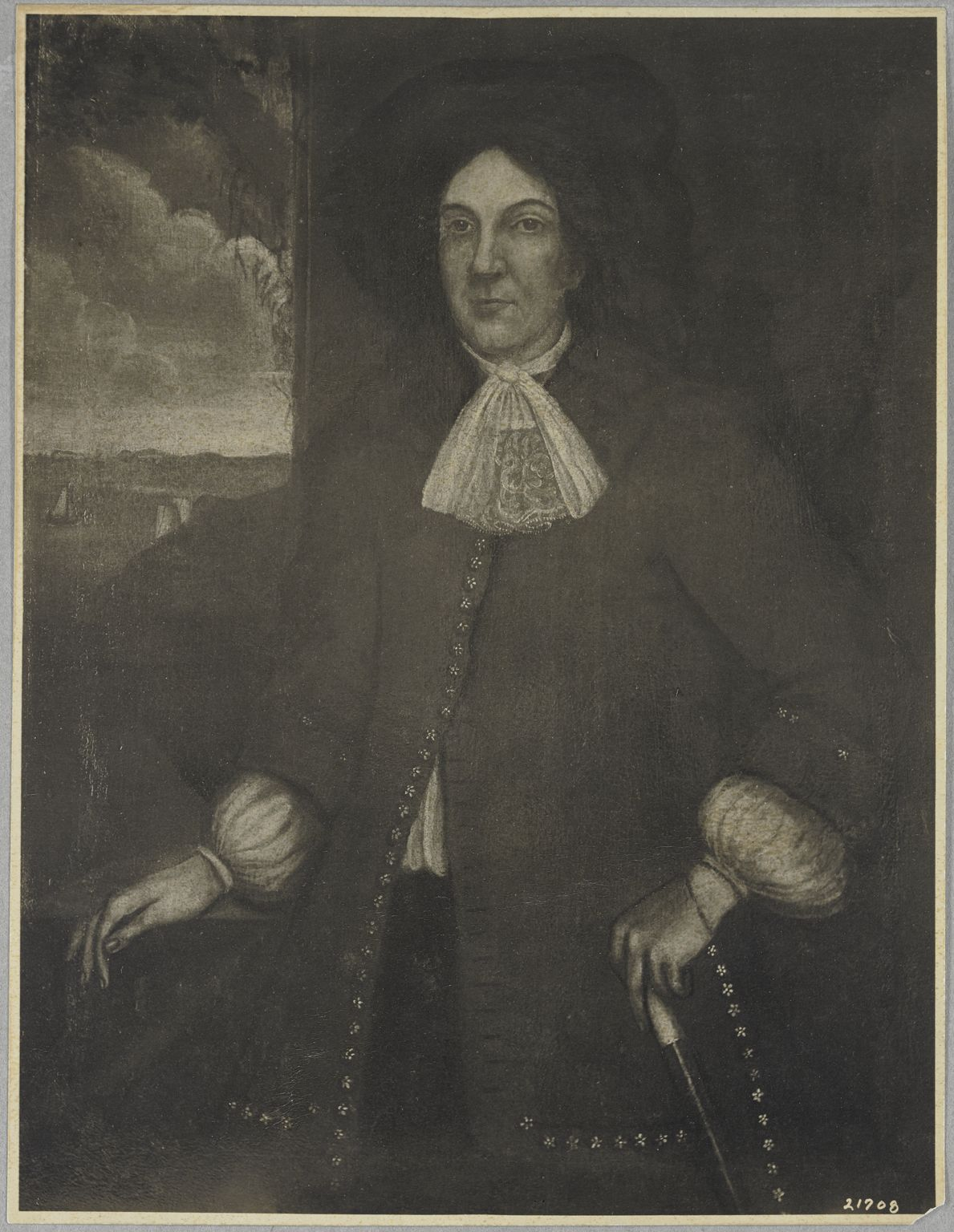
Captain Richard Patteshall

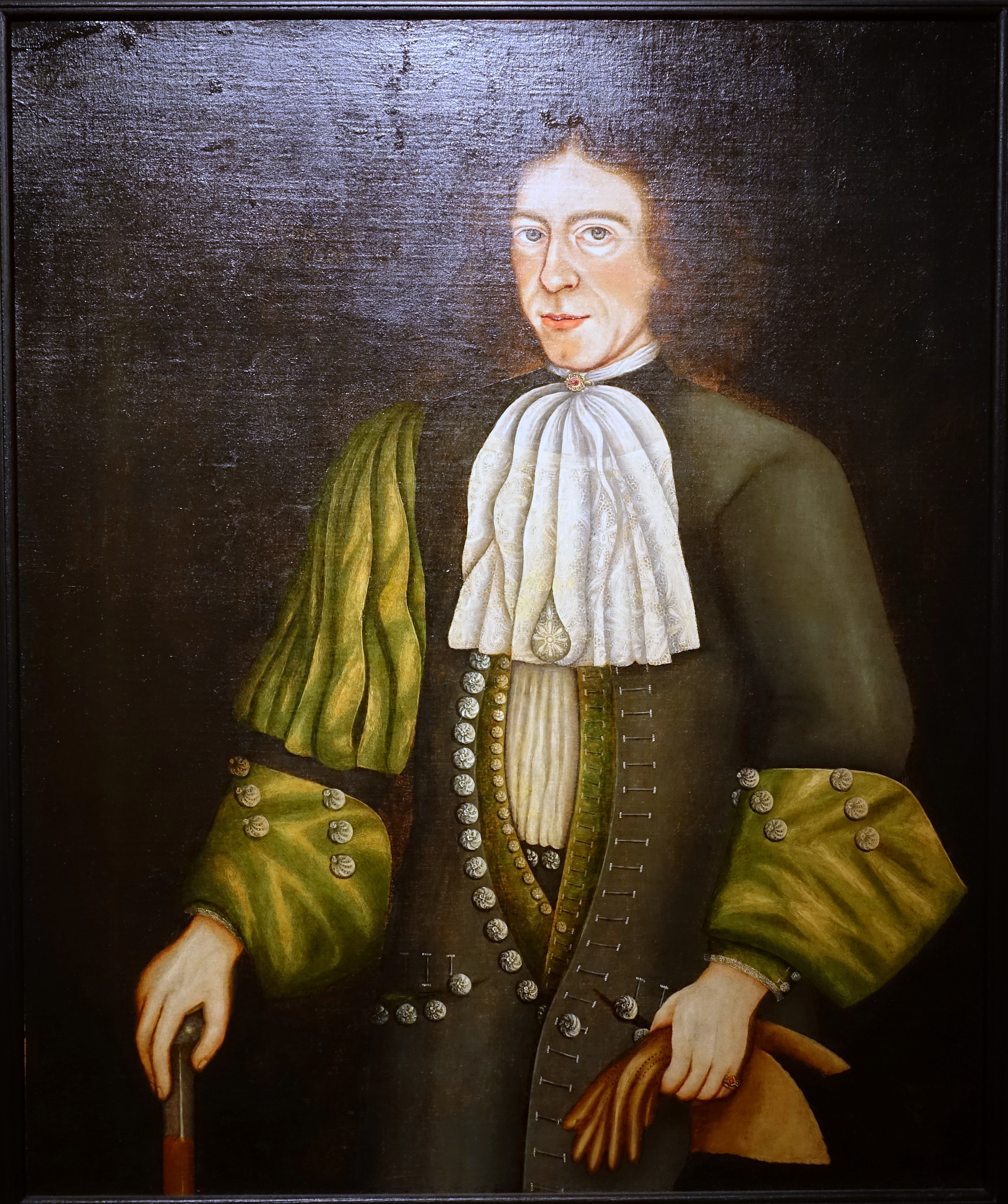
Unknown man, oil on canvas, 1685

== Sources ==
- Auger, Peter, 'The Octonaire in Thomas Smith's Self-Portrait', Huntington Library Quarterly 80 (2017), 1–19.
- Fairbanks, Jonathan L., “Portrait Painting in Seventeenth-Century Boston: Its History, Methods, and Materials,” in New England Begins: The Seventeenth Century, ed. Jonathan L. Fairbanks and Robert F. Trent, 3 vols. Boston: Museum of Fine Arts, 1982. 3:413–79
- Hughes, Robert. American Visions. New York: Random House, 1997.
- Miller, Lillian B., 'The Puritan Portrait: Its Function in Old and New England', in Seventeenth-Century New England, ed. David D. Hall and Philip Chadwick Foster Smith. Boston: The Colonial Society of Massachusetts, 1984, 153–84
- Promey, Sally, 'Seeing the Self "in frame": Early New England Material Practice and Puritan Piety', Material Religion 1 (2005), 10–46
- Stein, Roger B., 'Thomas Smith's Self-Portrait: Image/Text as Artifact', Art Journal 44 (1984), 316–27
