= Gerascophobia =

Abnormal fear of growing older

Gerascophobia is an abnormal or incessant fear of growing older or ageing (senescence). Fear is characterised as an unpleasant emotion experienced as a result of some perceived threat or source of danger, in the case of gerascophobia that threat is ageing. This fear is irrational and disproportionate to any threat posed and persists even in the case that the individual is in perfect health.

== Etymology ==
The term gerascophobia comes from the Greek γηράσκω, gerasko, "I grow old" and φόβος, phobos, "fear". Some authors refer to it as gerontophobia, although this may also refer to the fear of the elderly due to memento mori.

== Background ==
Gerascophobia is a clinical phobia generally classified under specific phobias. Gerascophobia may be based on a number of different anxieties related to the ageing process from the loss of physical youth and beauty, the loss of independence and mobility, to worry about the onset of sickness and the decline of physical and mental health.

== Symptoms and signs ==
Signs of gerascophobia include efforts to stop the natural processes of ageing and development by altering their physical appearance through either surgeries or excessive routines to promote anti-aging. For example, through skin and haircare routines. Symptoms also include avoidance behaviours in relation to the phobic stimulus. For example, sufferers may avoid looking at themselves in the mirror for fear of seeing that they have grown taller or developed wrinkles. Those with gerascophobia also typically report experiences of extreme anxiety and panic when confronted with the idea of ageing, which is often accompanied by depression or a low mood.

== Cases ==
There are few reported cases of gerascophobia; however, a 14-year-old boy who began displaying symptoms of gerascophobia when he was 12 is believed to be the first reported child to suffer from the illness and was diagnosed by specialists at the Autonomous University of Nuevo León in Mexico. The young boy is reported to have felt high levels of anxiety following physical changes suggestive of growth or aging and made consistent and substantial effort to counteract them. This involved physically bending over as to lower himself and not appear as tall, reducing his food intake to stunt physical body development and even altering his voice so that it appeared higher pitched indicating his efforts to regress to a prepubescent state.

== Theories explaining gerascophobia ==
Terror management theory is believed to be a potential explanation for gerascophobia and was developed by psychologists Greenberg and Solomon. The theory explores the terror that can result from an individual's unique awareness of death and mortality. Since the ageing process is a reminder of the inevitability of death, changes that indicate the ageing process can cause fear and anxiety potentially leading to the development of gerascophobia.

Stereotype embodiment theory also provides a possible explanation. The theory outlines the impact of age stereotypes on those that are exposed to them. The age stereotypes that individuals are exposed to are often dependent on their social and cultural upbringing, many of which portray the ageing process as something undesirable and negative. For example, the common depiction of old people as grotesque and unattractive in films and novels. One example comes from Roald Dahl's children's novel George's Marvellous Medicine in which one of the main characters is depicted as a "grizzly old grunion of a grandma". Furthermore, ageing is generally affiliated with the onset of diseases like dementia, high blood pressure, Alzheimer's disease and many more. Continued exposure to such negative stereotypes can lead to their internalisation and in turn negative views about the ageing process. Research has indicated that negative views about the ageing process contribute to ageing anxiety and therefore may be a risk factor in the onset of gerascophobia.

== Treatment ==
The theories above can provide a theoretical framework for understanding factors contributing to gerascophobia and therefore can be useful when understanding treatment. They suggest that the fear of ageing arises from the individual's perception of the ageing process and thus interventions targeting the individual's irrational and negative beliefs and attempting to normalise the ageing process can be useful. Psychotherapy is one approach that has been used successfully to combat gerascophobia. Psychotherapy most commonly involves one-to-one sessions with a trained professional that aim to help patients modify cognitions and in turn behaviours which cause them distress. In particular, a mentalisation-based approach is taken to combat gerascophobia which involves reflection upon one's own mental processes.

Medication is another form of treatment used to treat gerascophobia. Whilst it may not address the root cause of the phobia in the way that other treatments do, through their acknowledgment of the patient's irrational belief system, it is still effective in alleviating symptoms such as anxiety and depression. However, the most common and robust treatment for specific phobias is exposure therapy. This involves gradual exposure of increased intensity to the phobic stimulus and, by removing the option of avoidance behaviours, aims to change the patient's response to the phobic stimulus. This occurs through relaxation techniques at all stages of exposure which allow patients to relax in the presence of the phobic stimulus, allowing them to understand that it does not pose a threat in the way they believed.

== See also ==
- Existential crisis
- Fountain of Youth
- List of phobias
- Midlife crisis
- Nihilism
- Thanatophobia
