= Capela dos Ossos =

Historical monument in Évora, Portugal

Coordinates: 38°34′08″N 7°54′32″W

Interior of the chapel

Chapel wall

Skulls and bones decorating a pillar

The Capela dos Ossos (English: Chapel of Bones) is a monument in Évora, Portugal. It is a small interior chapel located next to the entrance of the Church of St. Francis. The Chapel gets its name because the interior walls are covered and decorated with human skulls and bones.

== Origin ==
The Capela dos Ossos was completed by Franciscan friars. An estimated 5,000 corpses were exhumed to decorate the walls of the chapel. The bones, which came from ordinary people who were buried in Évora's medieval cemeteries, were arranged by the Franciscans in a variety of patterns.

== Description ==
The chapel is formed by three spans 18.7 m (61.4 ft) long and 11 m (36 ft) wide. Light enters through three small openings on the left. Its walls and eight pillars are decorated in carefully arranged bones and skulls held together by cement. The ceiling is made of white painted brick and is painted with death motifs. The number of skeletons of friars was calculated to be about 5,000, coming from the cemeteries that were situated inside several dozen churches. Some of these skulls have been scribbled with graffiti. Two desiccated corpses, one of which is a child, are in glass display cases. And at the roof of chapel, the phrase "Melior est dies mortis die nativitatis (Better is the day of death than the day of birth)" (Ecclesiastes, 7, 1) from Vulgate is written.

== Poem ==
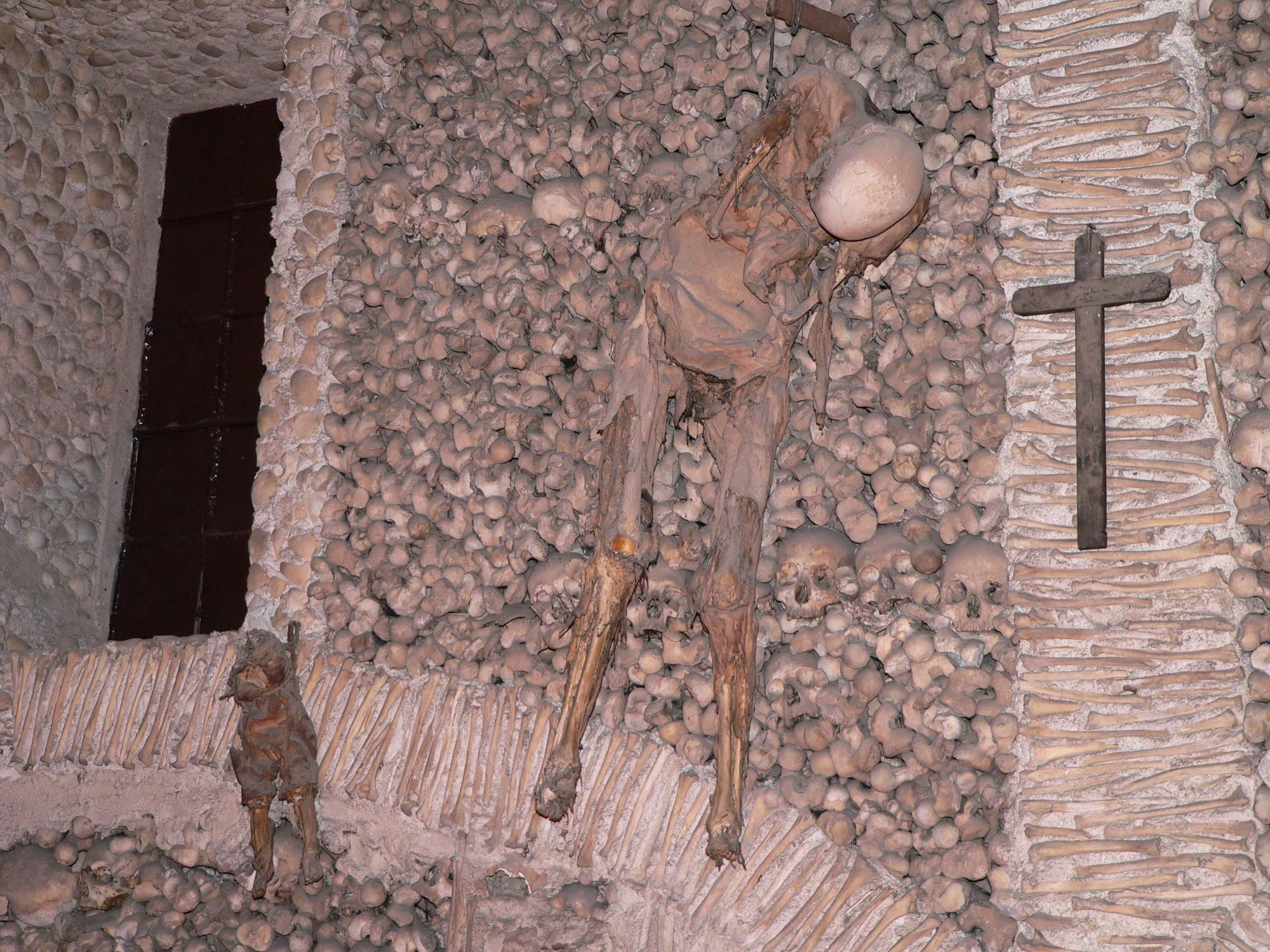
Image of two skeletons hanging from ropes

Inside the Capela dos Ossos a poem about the need to reflect on one's existence hangs in an old wooden frame on one of the pillars. It is attributed to Fr. António da Ascenção Teles, parish priest of the village of São Pedro (wherein the Church of Saint Francis with its Capela dos Ossos was erected) from 1845 to 1848.

Aonde vais, caminhante, acelerado?
Pára...não prossigas mais avante;
Negócio, não tens mais importante,
Do que este, à tua vista apresentado.

Recorda quantos desta vida têm passado,
Reflecte em que terás fim semelhante,
Que para meditar causa é bastante
Terem todos mais nisto parado.

Pondera, que influido d'essa sorte,
Entre negociações do mundo tantas,
Tão pouco consideras na morte;

Porém, se os olhos aqui levantas,
Pára...porque em negócio deste porte,
Quanto mais tu parares, mais adiantas.

— Padre António da Ascenção
Translation:

Where are you going in such a hurry, traveler?
Pause...do not advance your travel.
You have no greater concern than this one:
That which is now before your eyes.

Recall how many have passed from this world,
Reflect on your similar end.
There is good reason to do so;
If only all did the same.

Ponder, you so influenced by fate,
Among the many concerns of the world,
So little do you reflect on death.

If by chance you glance at this place,
Stop ... for the sake of your journey,
The longer you pause, the further on your journey you will be.

— Padre António da Ascenção, translated by Father Carlos A. Martins

== Images ==
Entrance: "We bones that are here await yours."

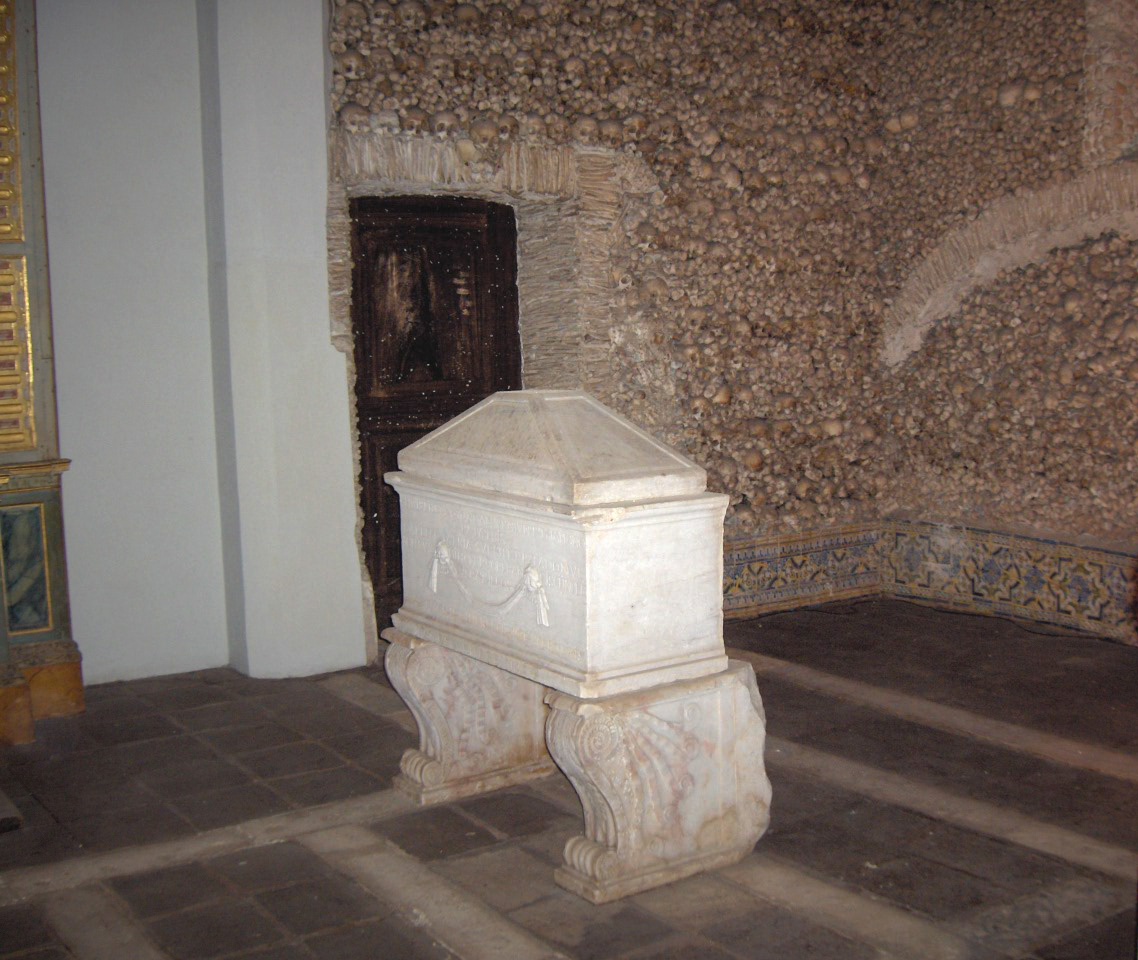
Ossuary

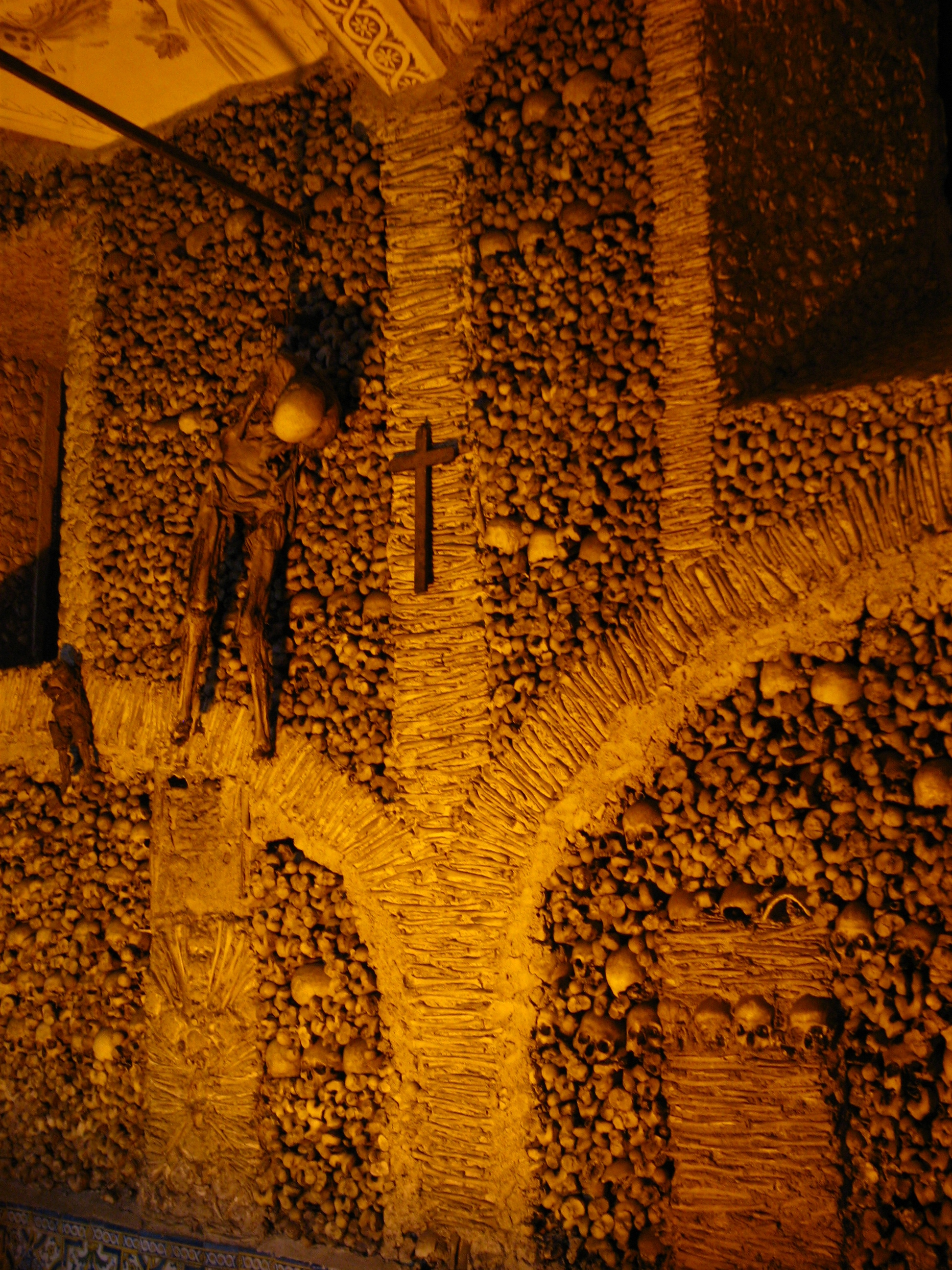
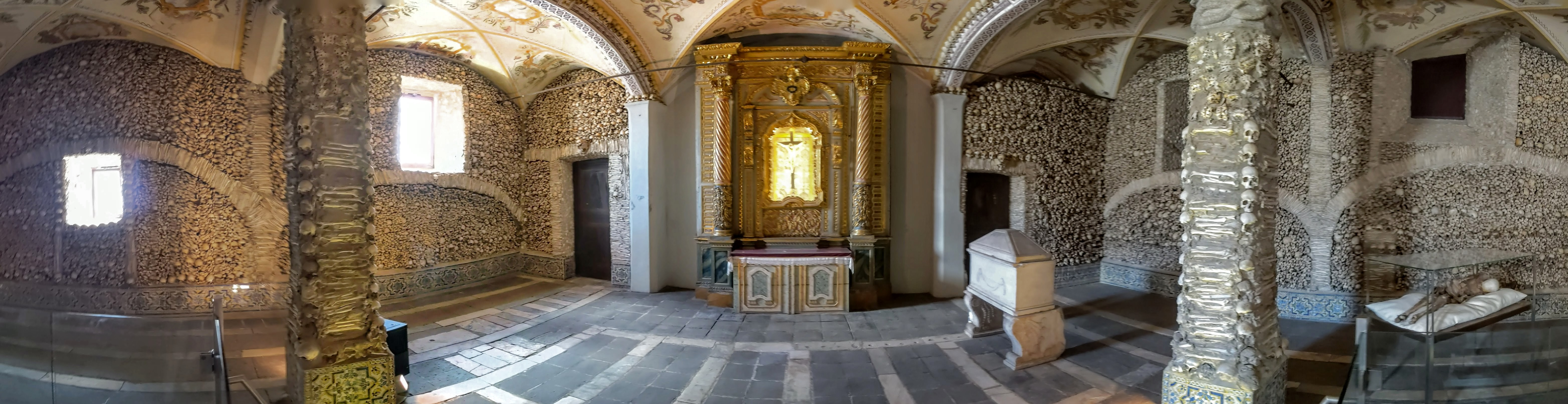
Panoramic view of the altar area in the chapel

== See also ==
- Capuchin Crypt
- Capuchin catacombs of Palermo
- Memento Mori
- Sedlec Ossuary
- Skull Tower
- Skull Chapel, Czermna
