= Anneli Rufus =

American journalist and author

Anneli Rufus is an American journalist and author.

Born in Los Angeles, California, and brought up in a Jewish household, she first went to college in Santa Barbara, then to the University of California, Berkeley. Rufus earned an English degree and became a journalist. She has written for many publications, including Salon.com, the San Francisco Chronicle and the Boston Globe.

Rufus is the author of many books, including The Scavengers' Manifesto (2009), The Farewell Chronicles: How We Really Respond to Death (2005) and Party of One: The Loners' Manifesto (2002).

== Bibliography ==
- Europe Off the Wall: A Guide to Unusual Sites (1988) ISBN 0-471-63737-8 (with Kristan Lawson)
- America Off the Wall: The West Coast: A Guide to Unusual Sites (1989) ISBN 0-471-62269-9 (with Kristan Lawson)
- Goddess Sites: Europe: Discover Places Where the Goddess Has Been Celebrated and Worshipped Throughout Time (1991) ISBN 0-06-250747-8 (with Kristan Lawson)
- The World Holiday Book: Celebrations for Every Day of the Year (1994) ISBN 0-06-250912-8
- Weird Europe: A Guide to Macabre, Bizarre and Just Plain Weird Sights (1999) ISBN 0-312-19873-6 (with Kristan Lawson)
- Magnificent Corpses: Searching Through Europe for St. Peter's Head, St. Claire's Heart, St. Stephen's Hand, and Other Saintly Relics (1999) ISBN 1-56924-687-4
- California Babylon: A Guide to Scandal, Mayhem and Celluloid in the Golden State (2000) ISBN 0-312-26385-6 (with Kristan Lawson)
- Party of One: The Loners' Manifesto (2002) ISBN 1-56924-513-4
- The Farewell Chronicles: How We Really Respond to Death (2005) ISBN 1-56924-381-6
- Stuck: Why We Can't (or Won't) Move On (2008) ISBN 1-58542-667-9
- The Scavengers' Manifesto (2009) ISBN 1-58542-717-9 (with Kristan Lawson)
- Unworthy: How to Stop Hating Yourself (2014) ISBN 0-39916-421-9
- The Haunted Guitar (2015)

=== As contributor ===
- The Party Girl Cookbook (2002) ISBN 0-7858-1564-3 (contributor)
- Roar Softly and Carry a Great Lipstick: 28 Women Writers on Life, Sex, and Survival (2004) ISBN 1-930722-38-9 (contributor)
- Not Like I'm Jealous or Anything: The Jealousy Book (2006) ISBN 0-385-73317-8 (contributor)
- The Secret Lives of Lawfully Wedded Wives: 27 Women Writers on Love, Infidelity, Sex Roles, Race, Kids, and More (2006) ISBN 1-930722-63-X (contributor)
- Alone in the Kitchen with an Eggplant (2007) ISBN 1-59448-947-5 (contributor)
