= Gerontophobia =

Fear of growing old, or a hatred for or fear of older adults

Gerontophobia is the hatred or fear of older adults, or a fear of age-related self-degeneration (similar to gerascophobia). The term comes from the Greek γέρων – gerōn, "old man" and φόβος – phobos, "fear". Gerontophobia that stems from a fear of aging has been linked to thanatophobia, as fear of old age can be a precursor to fear of death. Gerontophobia can be caused by stereotypes of older adults displayed in the media.

== Ageism ==
Discriminatory aspects of ageism have been strongly linked to gerontophobia. This irrational fear or hatred of older adults can be associated with the expectation that someday all young people including oneself will be old inevitably and suffer from the irreversible health decline that comes with old age, which is associated with disability, disease, and death. The sight of aged people could be a possible reminder of death (memento mori) and inevitable biological vulnerability. This unwillingness to accept these can manifest in feelings of hostility and discriminatory acts towards older adults.

== History ==
Old age was previously seen as a golden age in the Middle Ages. Around the time of the Anglo-Saxons there was a shift towards more negative views of the elderly, which led to more and more literature developing a gerontophobic view.

== Portrayal in literature and the media ==
Gerontophobia is heavily portrayed in literature and the media starting as early as Anglo-Saxon poetry but is also found in common literary classics such as William Shakespeare's King Lear, Jonathan Swift's Gulliver's Travels, and Jane Austen's Persuasion. Gerontophobia can also be found in many TV shows and movies.

== Treatments for gerontophobia ==
Treatment for gerontophobia can include better education about the elderly and aging as well as an increase in exposure and insight therapy.

== See also ==
- Gerascophobia
- Gerontocracy
- Intergenerational equity
- List of phobias
