= San Bernardino alle Ossa =

Church in Milan, Italy

Coordinates: 45°27′45.19″N 9°11′44.20″E

Church of San Bernardino alle Ossa (Chiesa di San Bernardino alle Ossa)
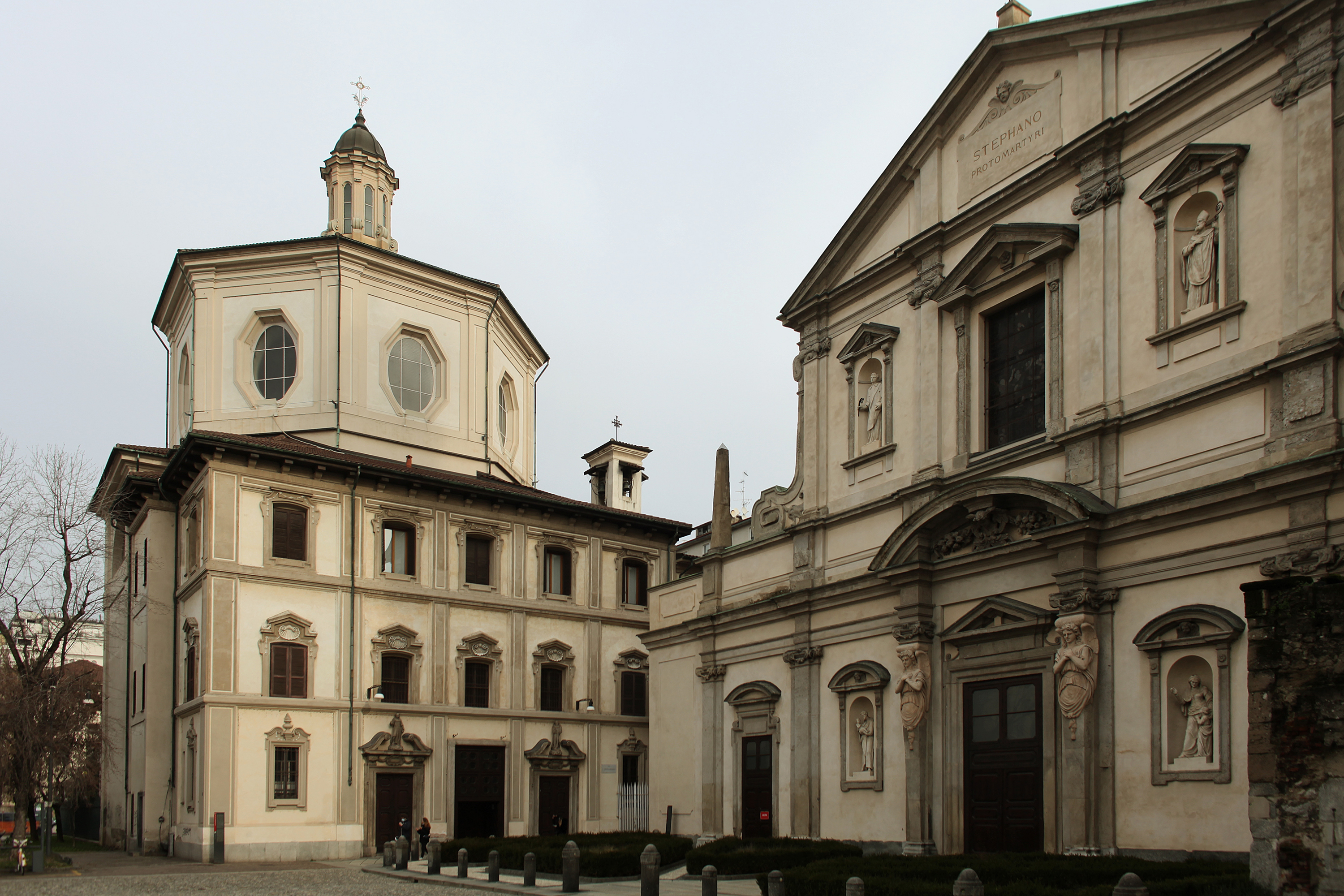
- Façade of the church.

Religion
- Affiliation: Roman Catholic
- Province: Milan
- Year consecrated: 1776
- Status: Active

Location
- Location: Milan, Italy
- Interactive map of Church of San Bernardino alle Ossa (Chiesa di San Bernardino alle Ossa)

Architecture
- Architect: Carlo Giuseppe Merlo
- Type: Church
- Style: Mannerist architecture
- Groundbreaking: 1269
- Completed: 1776

San Bernardino alle Ossa is a church in Milan, northern Italy, best known for its ossuary, a small side chapel decorated with numerous human skulls and bones.

In 1210, when an adjacent cemetery ran out of space, a room was built to hold bones. A church was attached in 1269. Renovated in 1679, it was destroyed by a fire in 1712. A new bigger church was then attached to the older one and dedicated to Saint Bernardino of Siena.

== History ==
=== Early Origins ===
The origins of San Bernardino alle Ossa can be traced back to a time long before the ossuary was built. The area itself has been significant for religious activity since the 4th century A.D. when Milan was a major hub of the Roman Empire. At that time, a cemetery and a small Christian church dedicated to Santo Stefano were established in this part of the city, which was situated just inside the Roman walls near Porta Romana.

By the early medieval period, a hospital was built adjacent to this cemetery. The hospital, founded in 1145, catered to the sick and the poor, reflecting the Christian principles of charity and care for the less fortunate. The growing population of Milan and the continued importance of Santo Stefano meant that the cemetery attached to this hospital quickly filled with the remains of the dead, leading to the need for a more permanent solution to house the bones.

=== Creation of the Ossuary ===
In 1210, a small chamber was built specifically to house bones from the overcrowded cemetery, marking the beginnings of the ossuary for which the site would later become famous. This chamber was adjacent to the church of Santo Stefano, which itself was becoming a prominent religious site. Over time, as more bones were interred in the chamber, it became clear that a larger church was needed. In 1269, a new church was constructed for the community and for the faithful who came to venerate the dead.

=== 14th to 17th Century Development ===
Over the next centuries, the church and its ossuary became increasingly significant. In the 1600s, the church was renovated under the direction of Giovanni Andrea Biffi, who made several important changes. He expanded the church and redesigned the ossuary, incorporating the human remains directly into the decoration of the walls. The bones, primarily skulls and tibiae, were arranged in an elaborate and macabre fashion, a practice that reflected both religious veneration and a philosophical meditation on death and the afterlife, common to Catholic practices of the time.

=== Destruction and Rebuilding in the 18th Century ===
The church, however, faced a major setback in 1712 when a fire destroyed most of the building. Recognizing the historical and spiritual importance of the site, the local authorities immediately commissioned a reconstruction project. Carlo Giuseppe Merlo, a renowned architect of the time, was assigned the task of rebuilding the church. His design significantly expanded the original structure, making it more prominent and suited to the growing number of pilgrims and visitors who were drawn to the ossuary. Merlo's design embraced the Baroque style, with a central-plan layout and a more monumental façade. The new church, completed in 1717, was dedicated to Saint Bernardino of Siena.

=== Continuing Restoration and Cultural Impact ===
The final piece of the structure, the façade, was completed in 1776, giving the church its current appearance. San Bernardino alle Ossa continued to serve as both a religious sanctuary and a place of reflection on death. Its ossuary, with walls adorned by carefully arranged bones, became not just a local curiosity but a destination for spiritual contemplation. The site reflected the Catholic belief in the triumph of the soul over death, making it a place of reverence and pilgrimage for centuries.

=== Recent Developments and Restoration Efforts ===
The most significant recent restoration efforts for San Bernardino alle Ossa date to 1931. During this time, a hidden crypt was discovered beneath the church, containing additional bones and relics, which added new layers to the site's historical and spiritual significance. These discoveries gave further insight into the early burials and historical role of the ossuary in Milan's religious life.

One of the major figures involved in the modern preservation and promotion of the church was Natale Oliva, who dedicated himself passionately to the church's preservation. He initiated several restoration projects aimed at improving the interior and conserving the fragile bone decorations in the ossuary. His efforts helped bring greater attention to the site's historical and cultural importance.

After Oliva's death, his work was continued by his successors, including Luigi Cortella and Giuseppe Arienti, who implemented further conservation initiatives. Their focus was on preserving the unique bone artwork, enhancing the lighting to illuminate the space better, and repairing parts of the structure that had deteriorated over the centuries.

== Overview ==
The interior has an octagonal plan, with Baroque-style decorations. The several chapels have paintings from the 16th-18th centuries.

The ossuary's vault was frescoed in 1695 by Sebastiano Ricci with a Triumph of Souls and Flying Angels, while in the pendentives are portrayed the Holy Virgin, St. Ambrose, St. Sebastian and St. Bernardino of Siena. Niches and doors are decorated with bones, in Roccoco style.

In 1738 King John V of Portugal was so struck by the chapel, that had a very similar one built at Évora, near Lisbon.

== The Ossuary ==
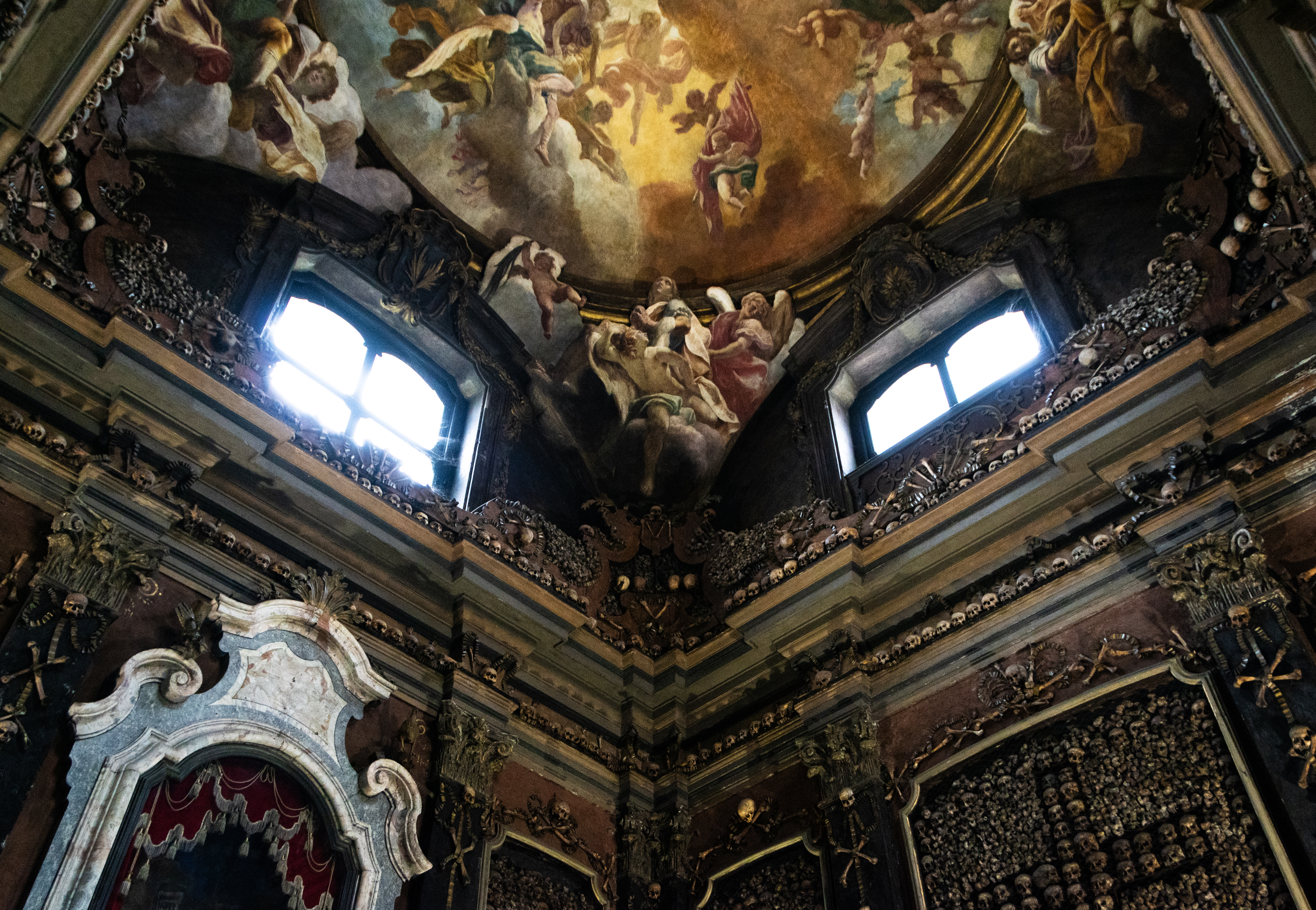
Corner and pendentive of the ossuary

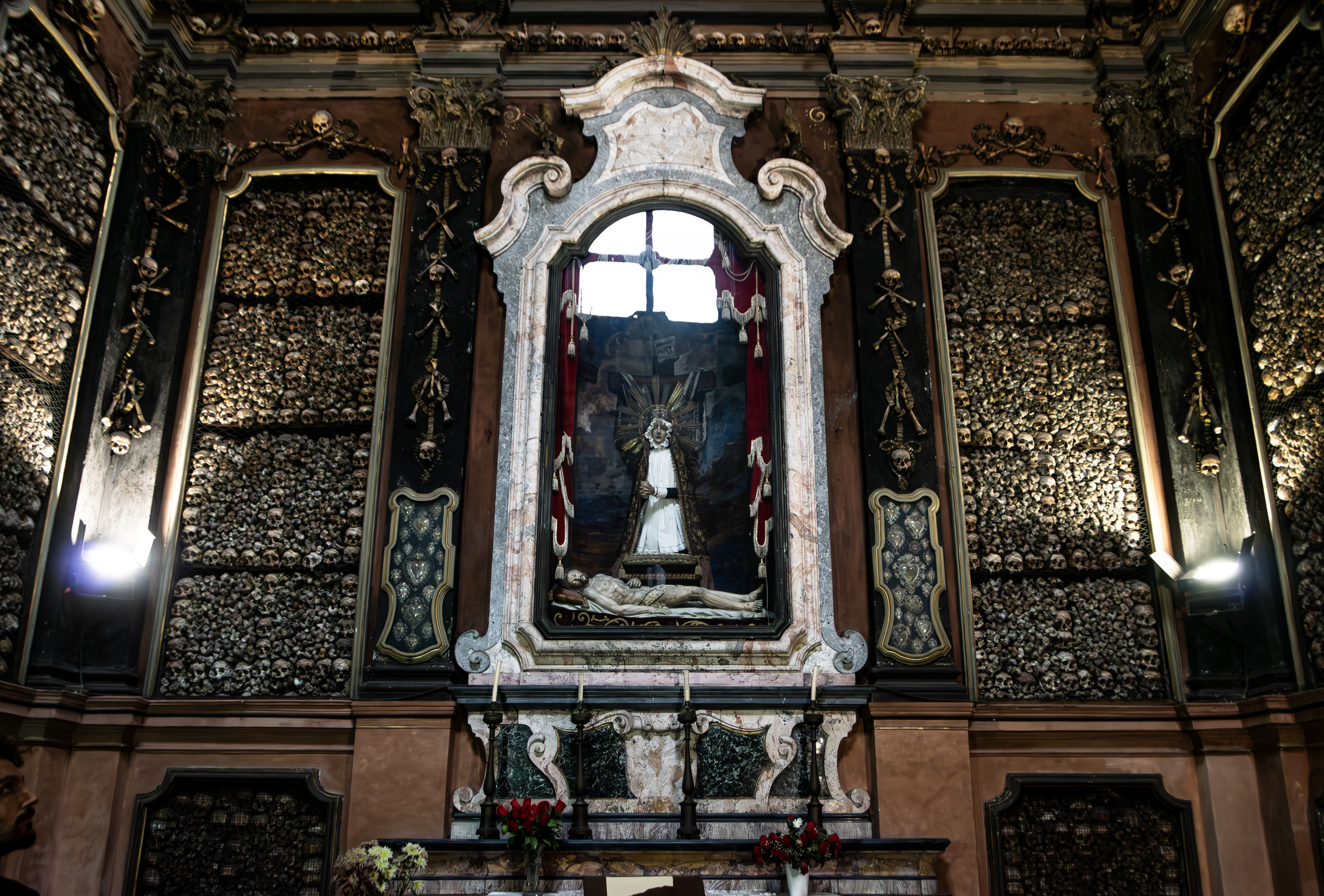
Altar containing statue of Our Lady of Sorrows and the dead Christ

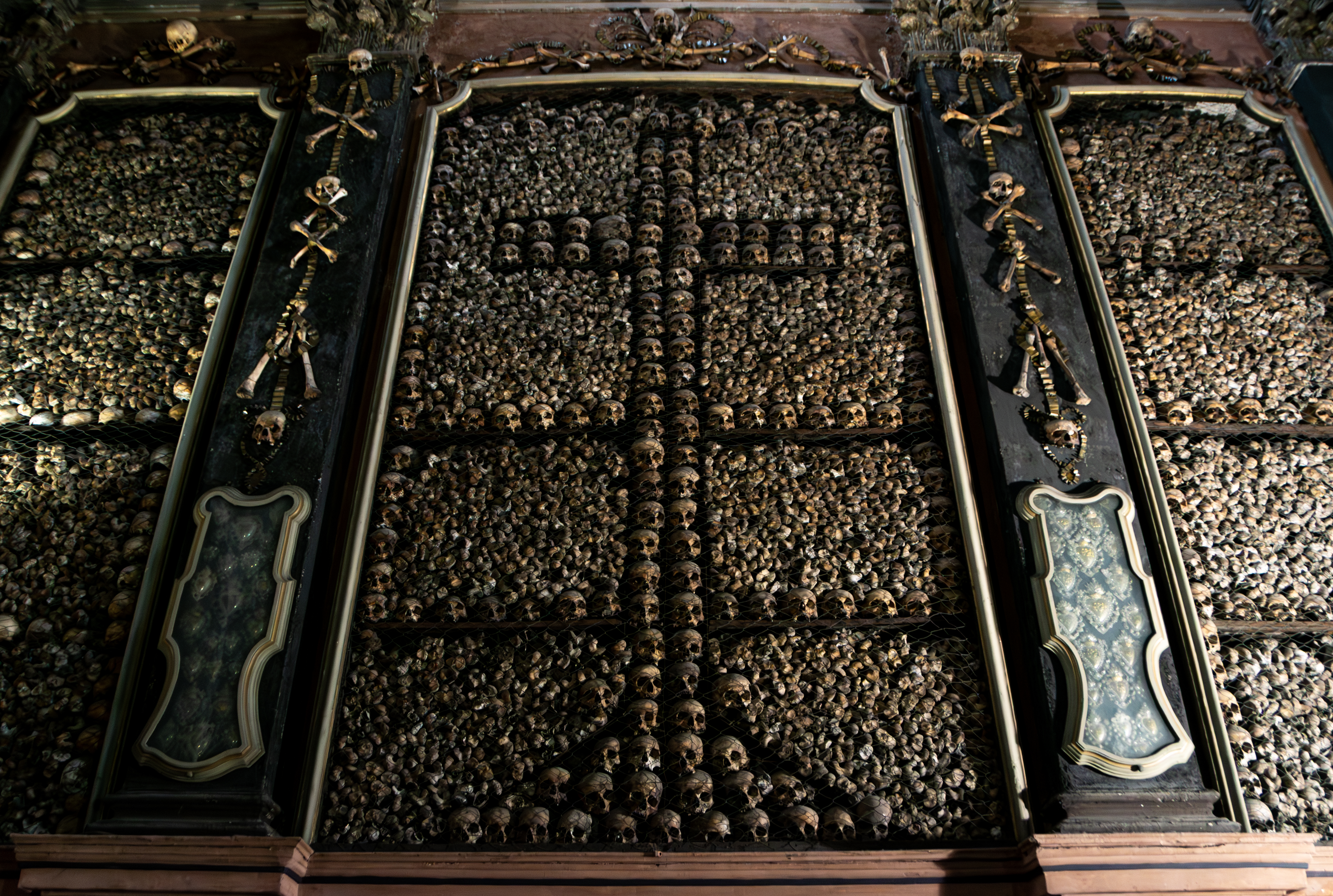
A wall of the ossuary

After the entrance, at the end of a long and narrow corridor, one enters the ossuary, where the ceiling was frescoed in 1695 by Sebastiano Ricci. The fresco, Triumph of Souls in a Flight of Angels, depicts angels and, in the vault's pendentives, the glory of the four patron saints: the Virgin Mary, Saint Ambrose, Saint Sebastian, and Saint Bernardino of Siena.

The interior walls of the ossuary, designed with a square floor plan, are almost entirely covered in skulls and bones. These remains were taken from the old ossuary as well as from the cemeteries that were closed following the local hospital's shutdown in 1652, as decreed by the administration of the Ospedale Maggiore, to which the hospital had been annexed nearly two centuries earlier.

All the bones were arranged decoratively in niches, on the cornice, adorning the pillars, and embellishing the doors. In this decorative scheme, the macabre theme blends seamlessly with the grace of Rococo style.

Above the single altar, made of fine marble and featuring the symbols of the Passion of Christ, stands a statue of Our Lady of Sorrows. She is depicted wearing a white robe, covered by a black cloak embroidered with gold, kneeling by the dead Christ with her hands clasped in prayer. This work was created in the mid-17th century by Gerolamo Cattaneo during the Spanish domination of Milan.

Many have speculated that the bones belong to the numerous Christian martyrs killed by Arian heretics during the time of Saint Ambrose. However, this theory does not hold up, as the bones have been identified as belonging to patients who died in the Brolo Hospital (located nearby), the priors and confreres who managed it, prisoners who were executed or who died in the local jails after 1622 when their cemetery became insufficient, as well as members of aristocratic families and canons from the nearby Basilica of Santo Stefano.

In 1738, King John V of Portugal was so impressed by the chapel that he decided to replicate it in every detail in Évora, near Lisbon, where it is now known as the Capela dos Ossos (Chapel of Bones).

== Gallery ==
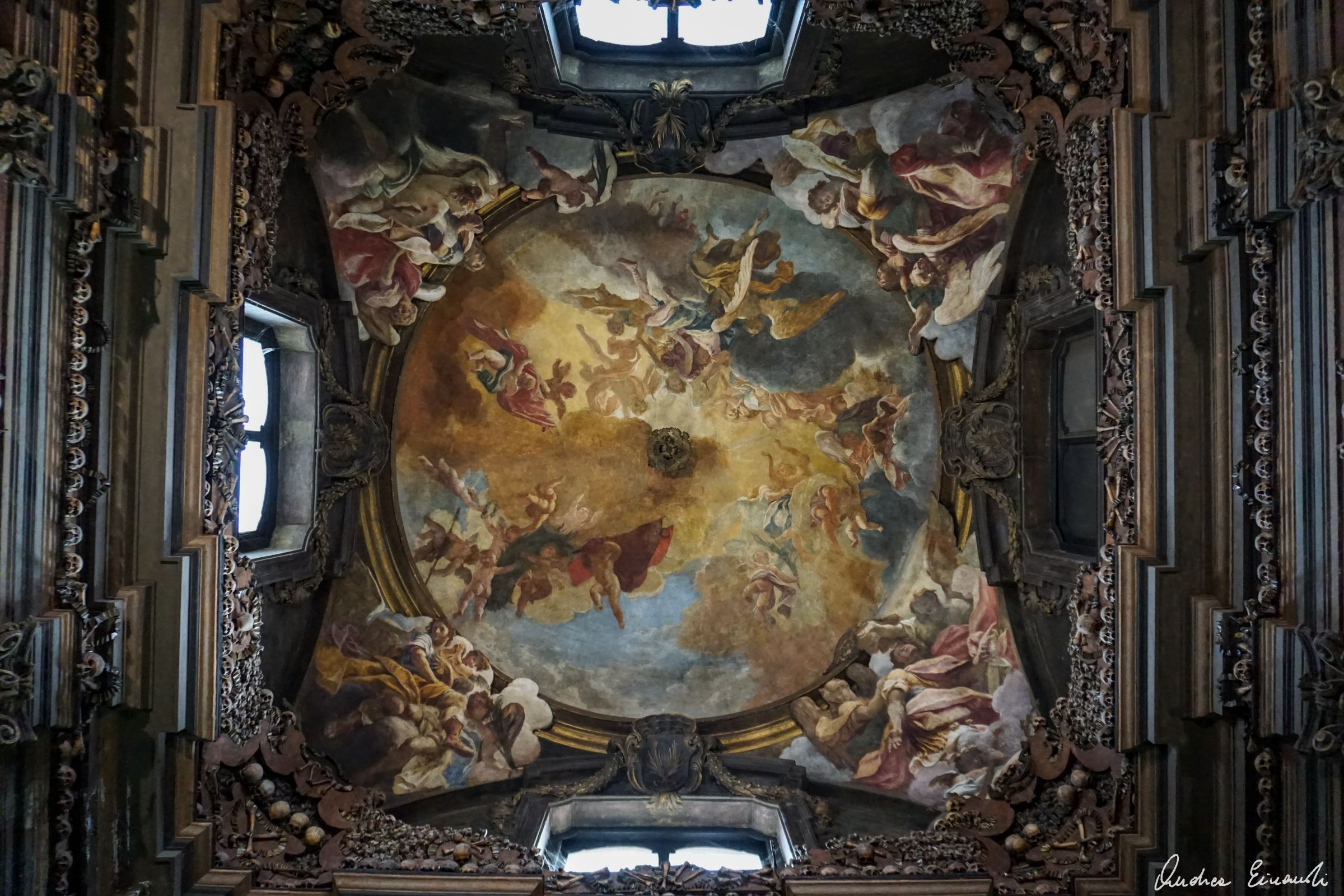
The frescoed vault of the ossuary

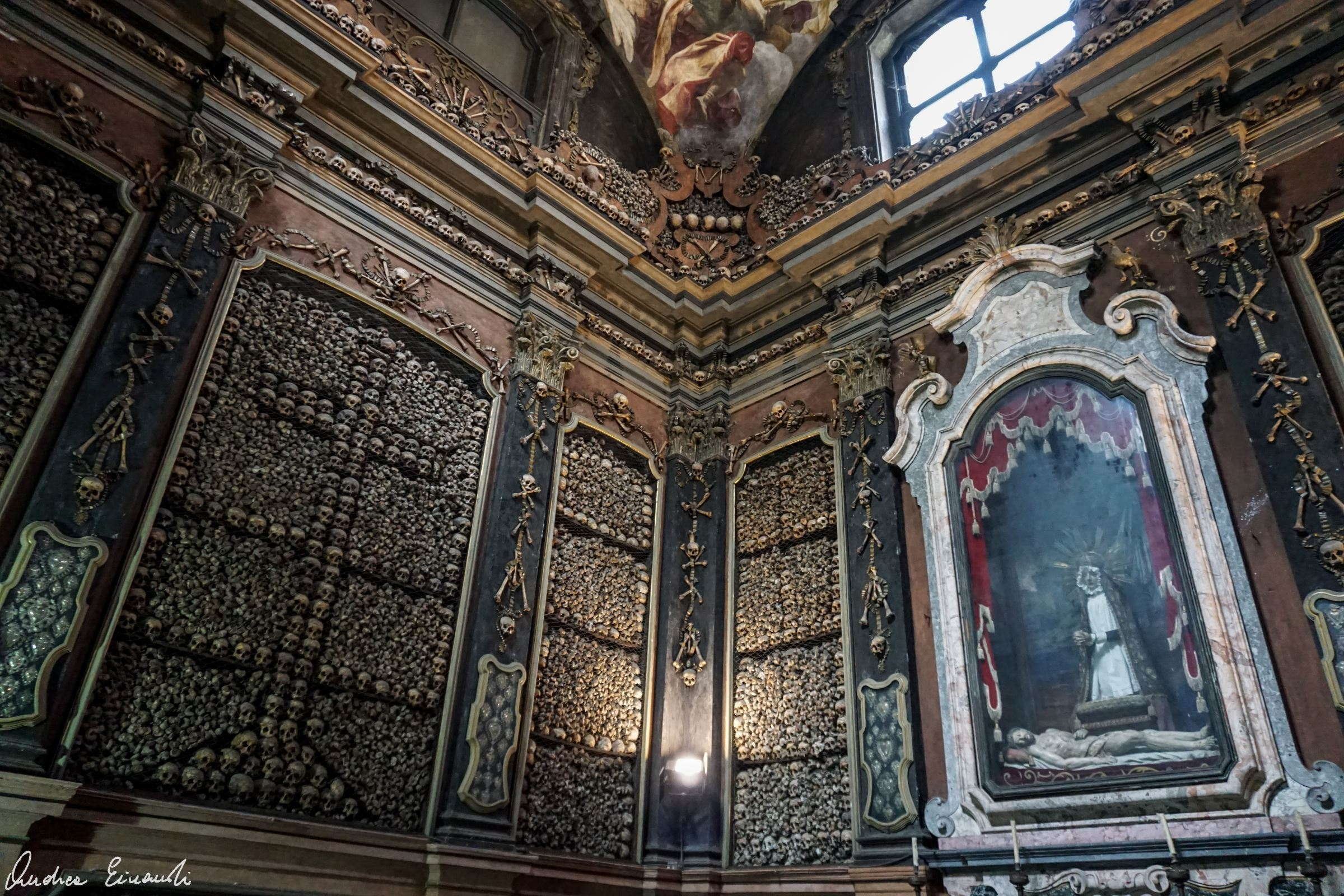
Inner view of the ossuary
