= Sant'Andrea, Pioltello =

Church in Pioltello, Italy

Coordinates: 45.500953°N 9.325561°E

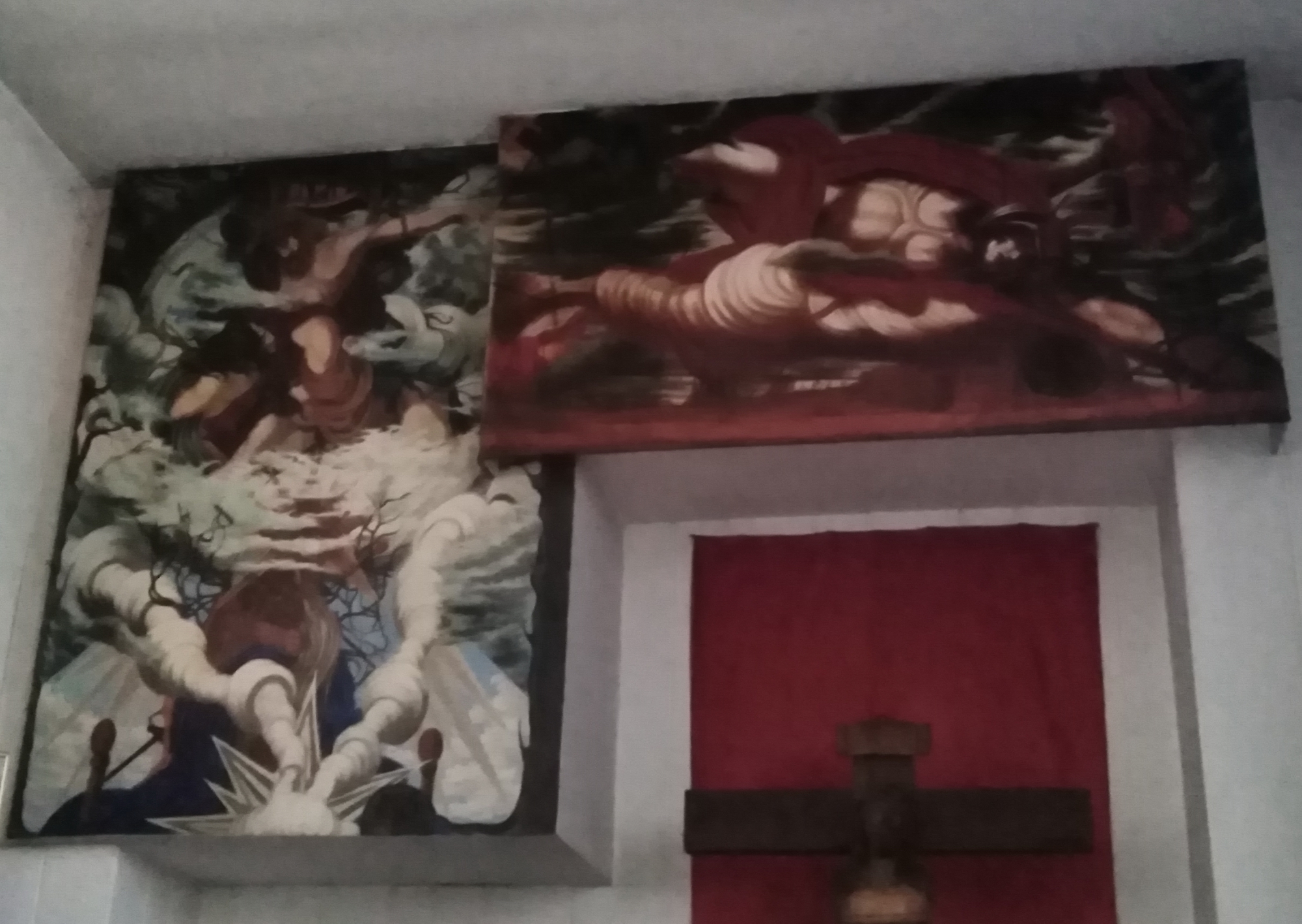

Sant'Andrea is a baroque-style, Roman Catholic church in the town of Pioltello, region of Lombardy, Italy.

== History ==
The church we see now was mainly erected in the 16th century, but has undergone substantial modifications over the centuries. A church at the site existed by the 13th century. A main reconstruction and expansion occurred during 1742-1745, when the façade and bell-tower were refurbished under the designs of Carlo Giuseppe Merlo. The chapels of the Rosary and of St Francis of Paola were decorated in the 18th century.

Later additions were frescoes by Giovanni Valtorta; Romeo and Paolo Rivetta; the brothers Rino; and Federico Bertini.
