= Carlo Giuseppe Merlo =

Italian architect

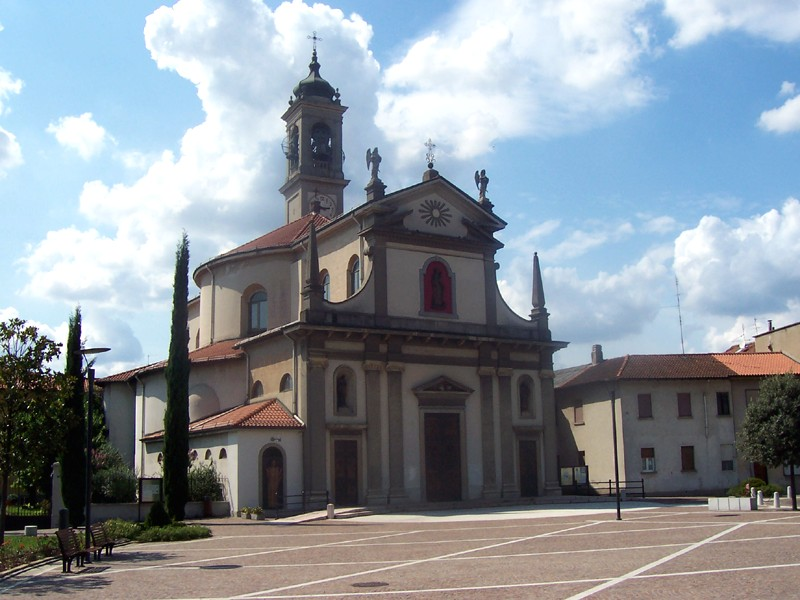
Santa Giuliana Parish Church in Caponago

Carlo Giuseppe Merlo (5 November 1690 – 13 February 1760) was an Italian architect of the late-Baroque period.

== Biography ==
=== Early career ===
Born in Milan, he was a pupil of Francesco Bianchi, and from 1708 to 1716 trained in the College of Engineers and Architects in Milan. He worked in the local Lombard architectural tradition but incorporated late Baroque elements, reflecting architectural trends throughout Europe. His early works included the Oratory for the church of San Bernardino, Milan (1716; completed 1749), the completion of the parish church at Desio (1726–36) and the Villa Perego (c. 1740) at Inverigo, both near Milan. In 1731, he designed the main altar for the Sanctuary of the Blessed Virgin of Caravaggio. In the following years Merlo designed and directed the construction of the entryway stairs for Palazzo Litta, Milan (1738), and designed the Oratory of the Immacolata in Magenta, Lombardy (1740).

=== Milan Cathedral ===
His most important work was at the Cathedral of Milan. Following the rejection of plans by Luigi Vanvitelli, the cathedral chapter entrusted Merlo and Francesco Croce with the task of carrying out the new façade (plans; Milan, Biblioteca Ambrosiana). Merlo’s plans, prepared in 1745, proposed Gothic pilasters similar to those of the interior, replacing the twisted columns proposed by Vanvitelli. Work did not begin until 1765 but was completed under Croce’s supervision by 1769. Merlo also made proposals in 1759 for the great spire of the cathedral.

=== Other works ===
During his years of association with the cathedral Merlo also designed the façade of Sant'Andrea Apostolo (1745) at Pioltello, which incorporated vegetable motifs on the volutes connecting the upper and lower storeys, and the elaborate patterned marble high altar (1759) of San Sebastiano. He was a member of the Accademia dei Trasformati, Milan, and left two printed works on hydraulics as well as several manuscript studies, one of which was on curves. This interest in curvilinear form derived from Guarino Guarini and was reflected in his elliptical ground-plan for Santa Giuliana at Caponago (1742), where the interior is planned as a series of free-flowing lines articulated with free-standing Ionic columns and Ionic pilasters.

In conjunction with Giulio Galliori Merlo designed the ephemeral decorative car used to translate the body of St. Charles Borromeo. Again with Galliori he designed the cupola of the Sanctuary of the Blessed Virgin of the Sorrows, Rho. He helped raise the belltower for the parochial church of Olginate. He also helped design a house for the poor and jail.

== Bibliography ==
- Mander, Micaela (2009). "MERLO, Carlo Giuseppe". Dizionario Biografico degli Italiani (in Italian). Vol. 73: Meda–Messadaglia. Rome: Institute of the Italian Encyclopaedia. ISBN 978-88-12-00032-6.
