= Apotheosis of Saint Sebastian =

Painting by Sebastiano Ricci

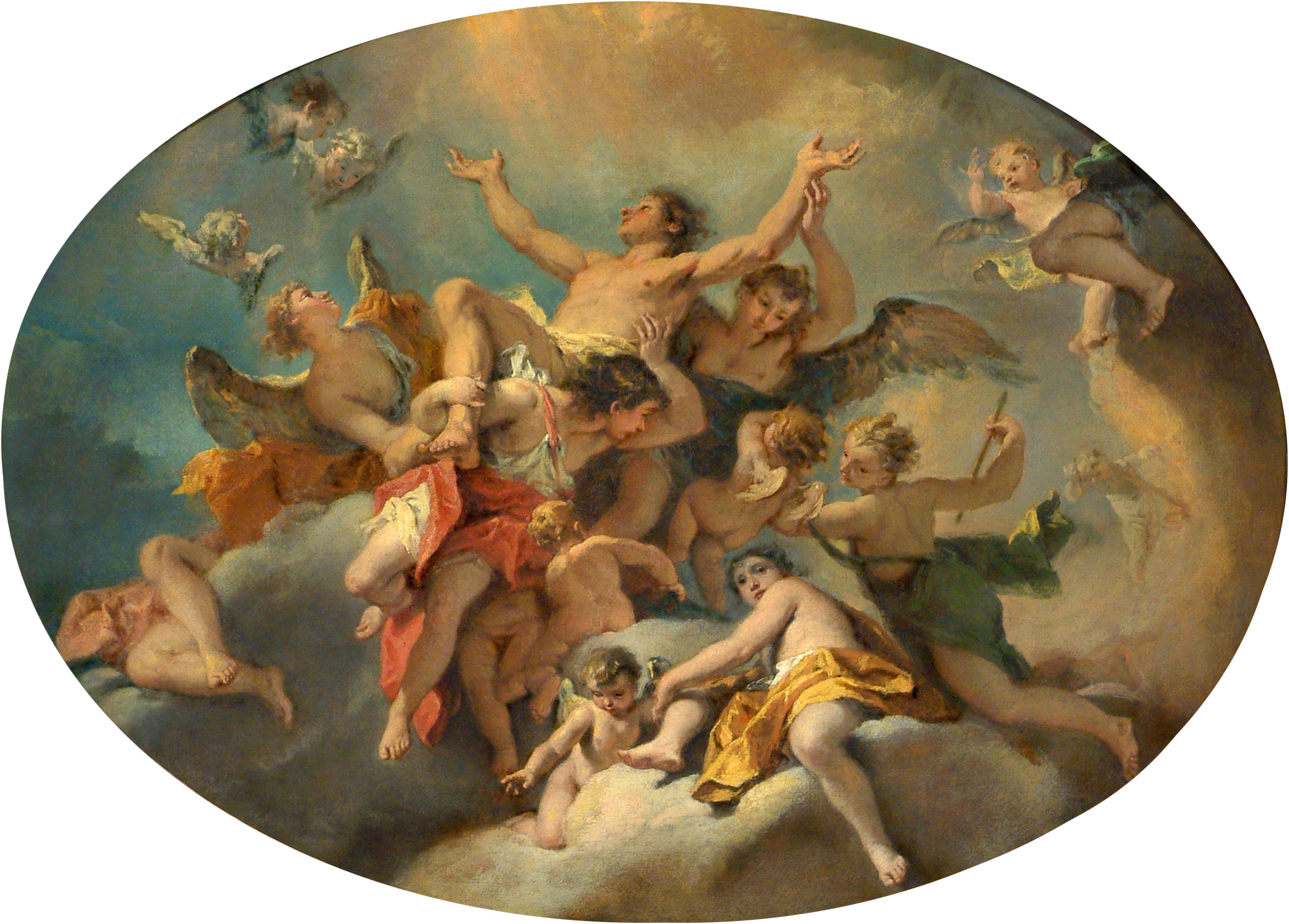
- Artist: Sebastiano Ricci
- Year: circa 1725
- Medium: oil painting on canvas
- Movement: Italian Baroque; Venetian painting Catholic art
- Subject: Apotheosis of Saint Sebastian
- Dimensions: 66 cm × 88 cm (26 in × 35 in)
- Location: Musée des Beaux-Arts, Strasbourg
- Accession: 1994

Apotheosis of Saint Sebastian is a circa 1725 oil on canvas painting by the Italian Baroque painter Sebastiano Ricci. It is now in the Musée des Beaux-Arts of Strasbourg, France. Its inventory number is 994-1-5.

The painting has been called "magnificent, one of Sebastiano Ricci's most perfect achievements" (l'oœuvre est magnifique, elle compte parmi les plus parfaites réussites de Sebastiano Ricci) by the art historian Pierre Rosenberg, writing in 1984. It is a late version of a theme that Ricci had treated between 1696 and 1698 in a now destroyed fresco in St Sebastian Church, Venice. A modello for that fresco (oil on canvas, 71 × 71 cm, or 28 × 28 in) has survived and is currently in a private collection.

Apotheosis of Saint Sebastian was given to the museum in 1994 by the collectors Othon Kaufmann and François Schlageter, together with another painting by Ricci and several other Italian works, among which Crespi's L'Ingegno, and Vignali's Cyparissus. The two men had bought the painting at Thomas Agnew & Sons (London) in 1954. The painting had belonged to the Dukes of Buccleuch and was sold in 1953 as part of the estate of Rodney Matthews-Napier, an Australian who had married a member of that aristocratic family.
