= San Beneto =

Church building in Venice, Italy

Church of San Beneto
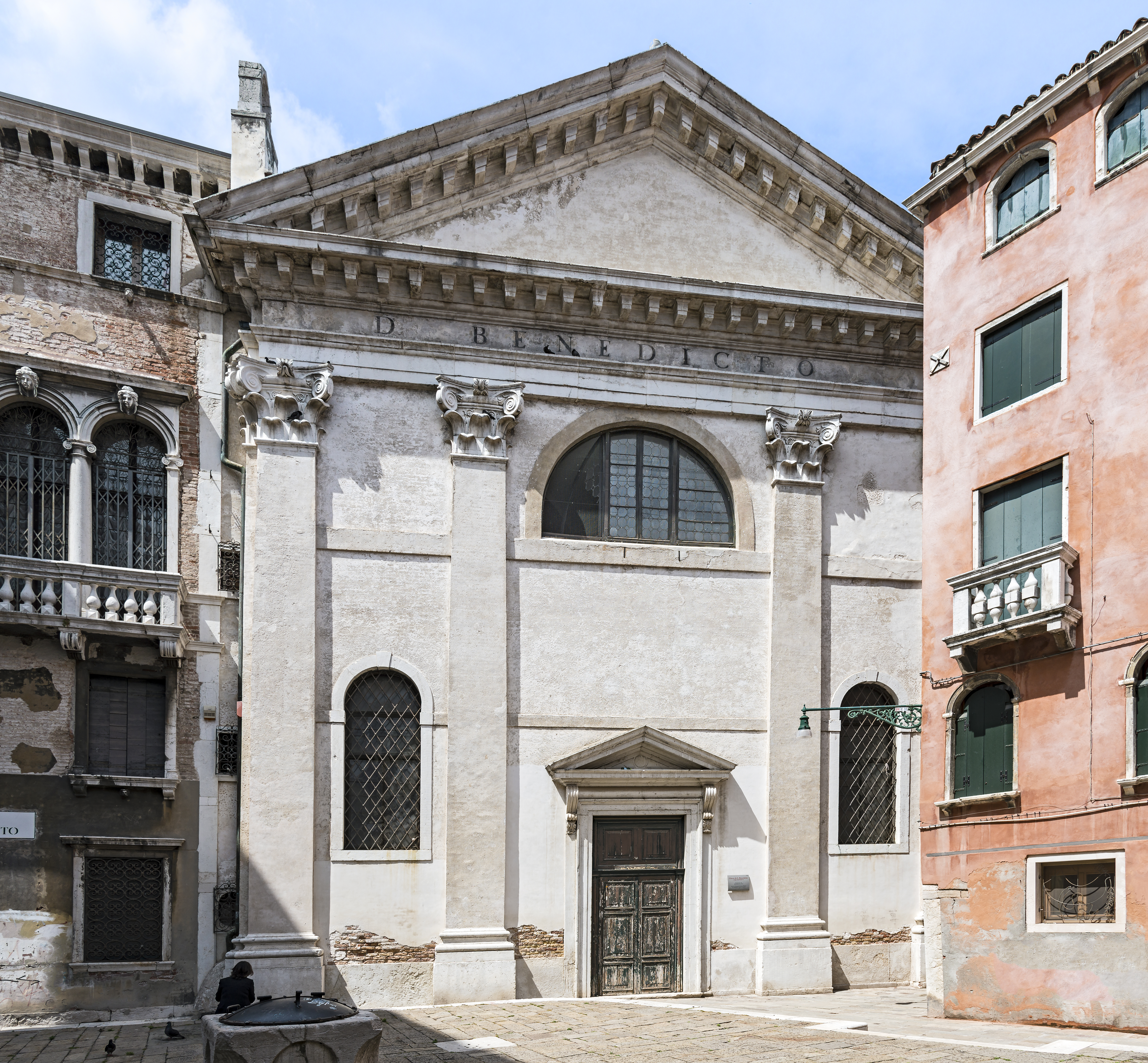

- Location within Venice

Religion
- Affiliation: Roman Catholic

Location
- Municipality: Venice
- Country: Italy
- Coordinates: 45°26′08″N 12°19′57″E

Architecture
- Type: Church
- Style: Baroque
- Completed: 1685

The Chiesa di San Benedetto (Church of Saint Benedict) is a Roman Catholic church in Venice, northern Italy. Generally known as San Beneto in the Venetian dialect, the church faces the square named after it, the Campo San Beneto. It was founded in the 11th century and rebuilt in 1685.

San Beneto is a vicariale (subsidiary) church of the parish of San Luca.

== Works of art ==
- A Priest recommended to the Virgin by St Benedict and St Benedict with John the Baptist and the Virtues by Sebastiano Mazzoni located over the doors to either side of the high altar.
- St Sebastian tended by the Holy Women by Bernardo Strozzi located on the south wall.
- San Francesco di Paola by Giambattista Tiepolo located on the north wall.
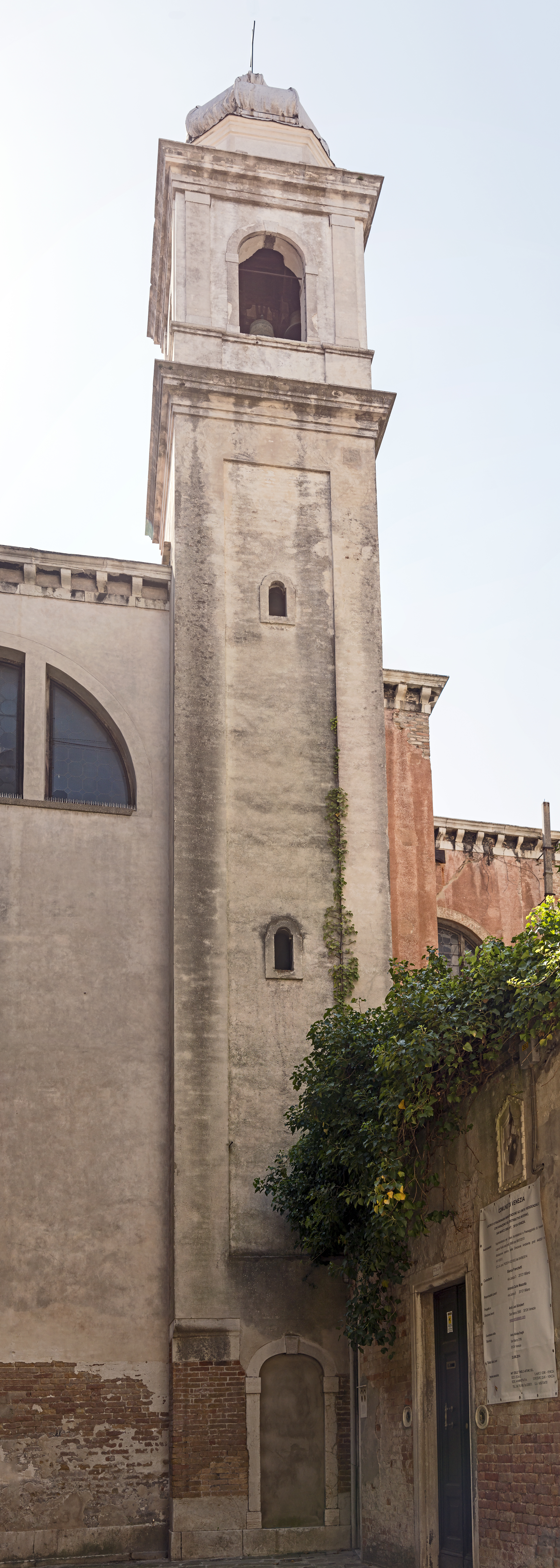
Bell tower (on the side alley Corte Tron)

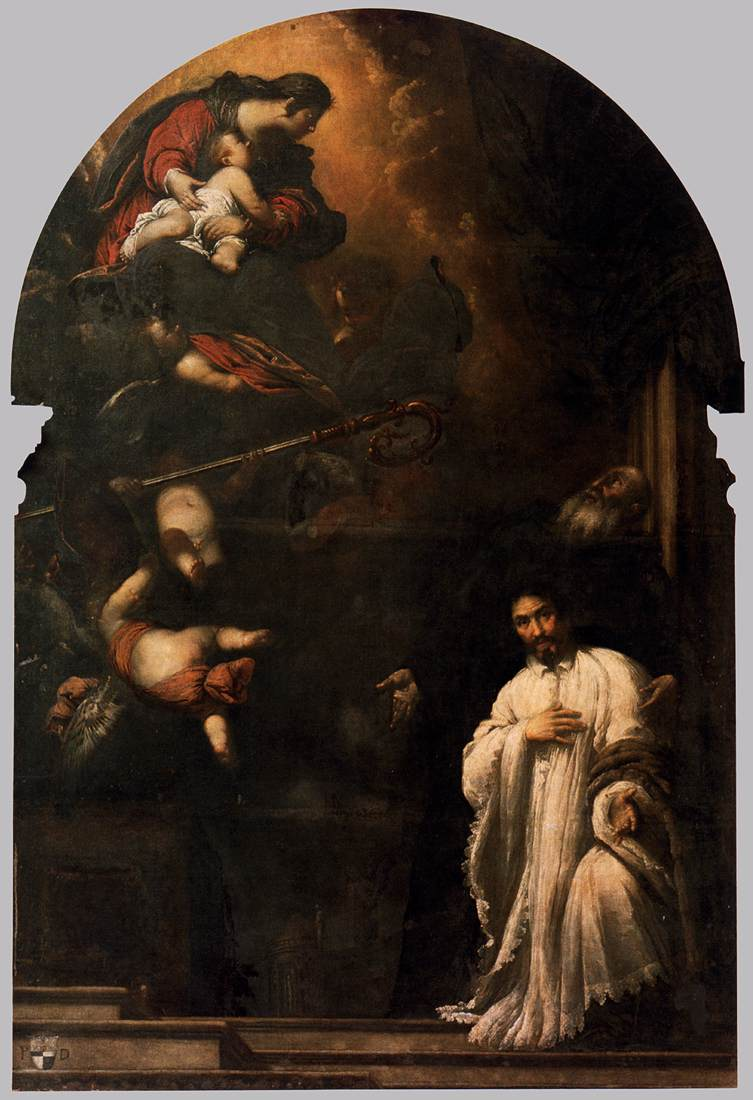
St Benedict Presents Pasqualino Daneli to the Virgin (Sebastiano Mazzoni)
