= Sebastiano Ricci =

Italian painter (1659–1734)

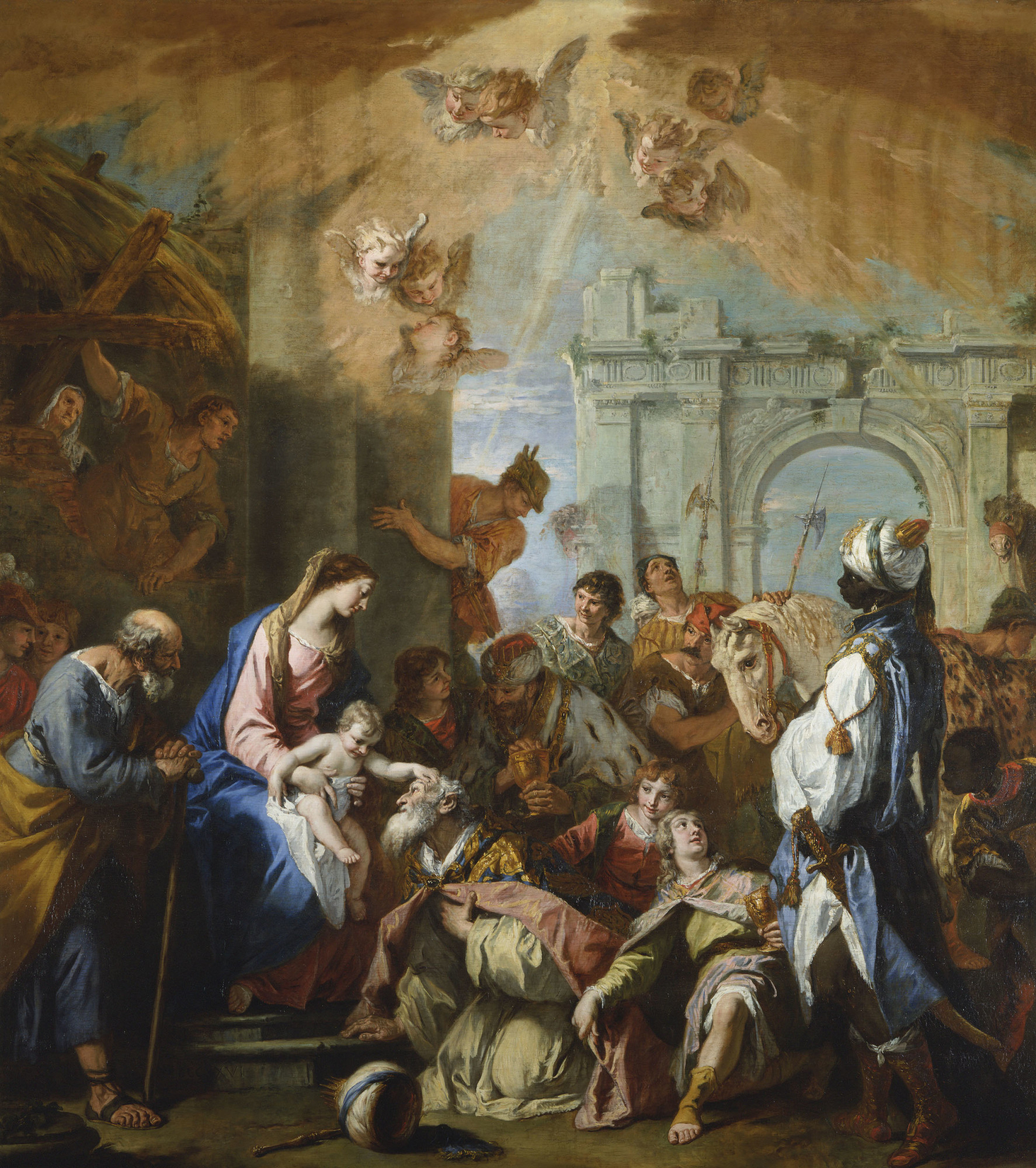
- The Adoration of the Kings, 1726 (Royal Collection)
- Born: 1 August 1659; Belluno, Veneto, Republic of Venice
- Died: 15 May 1734 (aged 74); Venice, Republic of Venice
- Occupation: Painter
- Spouse: Unidentified wife (m. 1691)
- Children: 1
- Family: Marco Ricci (nephew)

Sebastiano Ricci (1 August 1659 – 15 May 1734) was an Italian Baroque painter of the late Baroque period in Venetian painting. About the same age as Piazzetta, and an elder contemporary of Tiepolo, he represents a late version of the vigorous and luminous Cortonesque style of grand manner fresco painting.

He was the uncle of Marco Ricci (1676–1730), who trained with him, and became an innovator in landscape painting.

== Early years ==
He was born in Belluno, the son of Andreana and Livio Ricci. In 1671, he was apprenticed to Federico Cervelli of Venice. Others claim Ricci's first master was Sebastiano Mazzoni. Indiscretion at a young age in 1678 resulted in an unintended pregnancy and, later, a bigger scandal when Ricci was charged with trying to poison the young woman in question to avoid marriage. He was imprisoned, and released only after the intervention of a nobleman, probably a Pisani family member. He eventually married the mother of his child in 1691, although this was a stormy union.

Following his release he moved to Bologna, where he lived near the Parish of San Michele del Mercato. His painting style there was apparently influenced by Giovanni Gioseffo dal Sole. On 28 September 1682 he was contracted by the "Fraternity of Saint John of Florence" to paint a Decapitation of John the Baptist for their oratory.

On 9 December 1685, the Count of San Secondo near Parma commissioned the decoration of the Oratorio della Beata Vergine del Serraglio, which Ricci completed in collaboration of Ferdinando Galli-Bibiena by October 1687, receiving a payment of 4,482 Lira. In 1686, the Duke Ranuccio II Farnese of Parma commissioned a Pietà for a new Capuchin convent. In 1687-8 Ricci decorated the apartments of the Parmense Duchess in Piacenza with canvases recounting the life of the Farnese pope, Paul III.

== Turin and return to Venice ==
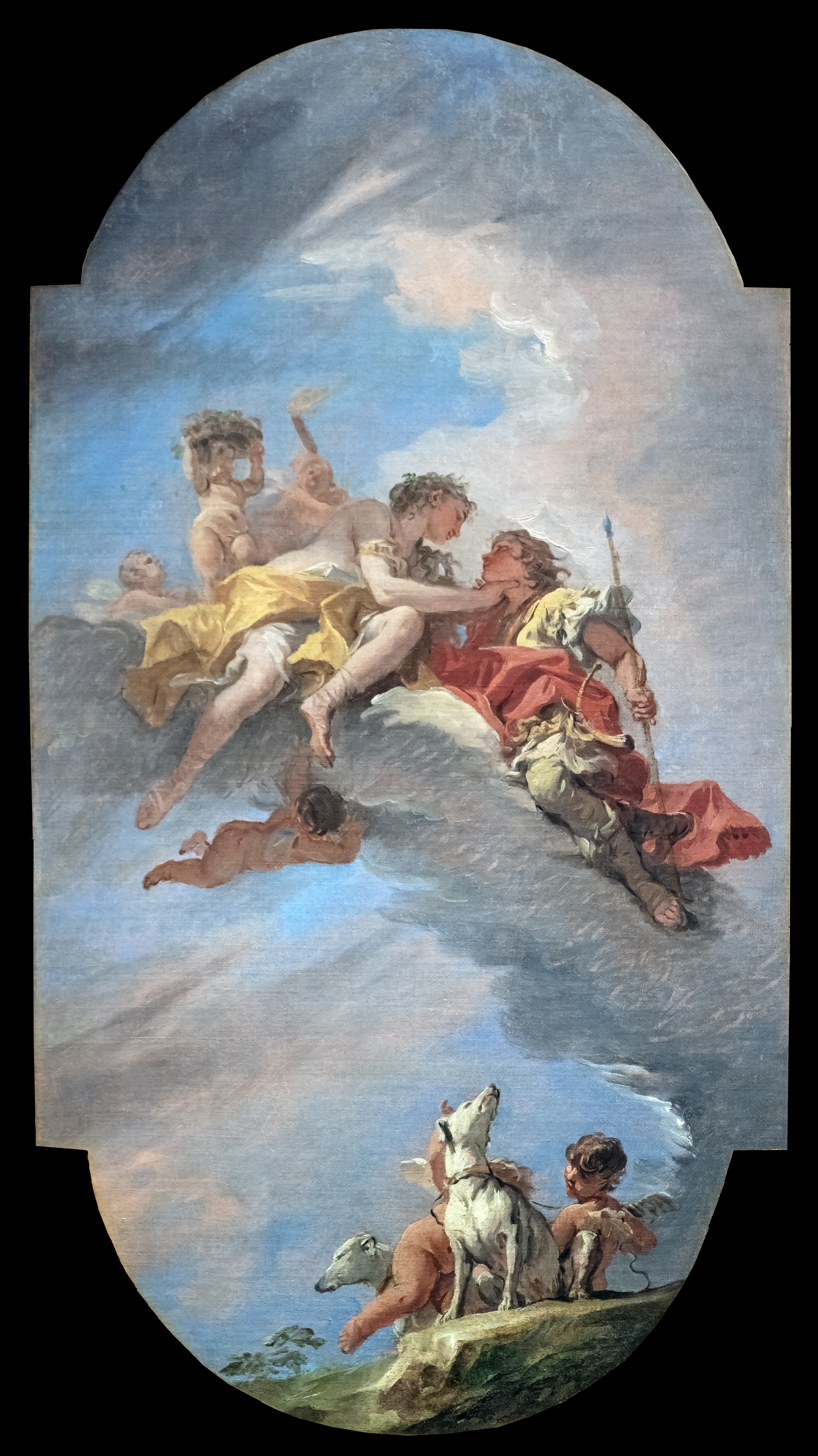
Venus and Adonis

Apparently in 1688, Ricci abandoned his wife and daughter, and fled from Bologna to Turin with Magdalen, the daughter of the painter Giovanni Peruzzini. He was again imprisoned, and nearly executed, but was eventually freed by the intercession of the Duke of Parma. The duke employed him and assigned him a monthly salary of 25 crowns and lodging in the Farnese palace in Rome. In 1692, he was commissioned to copy the Coronation of Charlemagne by Raphael in Vatican City, on behalf of Louis XIV, a task he finished only by 1694.

The death of the Duke Ranuccio in December, 1694, who was also his protector, forced Ricci to abandon Rome for Milan, where by November 1695 he completed frescoes in the Ossuary Chapel of the Church of San Bernardino dei Morti. On 22 June 1697, the Count Giacomo Durini hired him to paint in the Cathedral of Monza.

In 1698, he returned to the Venetian republic for a decade. By 24 August 1700, he had frescoed the chapel of the Santissimo Sacramento in the church of Santa Giustina of Padua. In 1701, the Venetian geographer Vincenzo Coronelli commissioned a canvas of the Ascension that was inserted into the ceiling of sacristy of the Basilica of the Santi Apostoli in Rome. In 1702, he frescoed the ceiling of the Blue Hall in the Schönbrunn Palace, with the Allegory of the Princely Virtues and Love of Virtue, which illustrated the education and dedication of future emperor Joseph I. In Vienna, Frederick August II, the elector Saxony, requested an Ascension canvas, in part to convince others of the sincerity of his conversion to Catholicism, which allowed him to become the King of Poland.

In Venice in 1704 he executed a canvas of San Procolo (Saint Proculus) for the Dome of Bergamo and a Crucifixion for the Florentine church of San Francisco de Macci.

== Florentine frescoes ==
In the summer of 1706, he traveled to Florence, where he completed a work that is by many considered his masterpieces. During his Florentine stay he first completed a large fresco series on allegorical and mythological themes for the now-called Marucelli-Fenzi or Palazzo Fenzi (now housing departments of University of Florence). After this work, Ricci, along with the quadraturista Giuseppe Tonelli, was commissioned by the Grand Duke Ferdinando de' Medici to decorate rooms in the Pitti Palace, where his Venus takes Leave from Adonis contains heavenly depictions that are airier and brighter than prior Florentine fresco series. These works gained him fame and requests from foreign lands and showed the rising influence of Venetian painting into other regions of Italy. He was to influence the Florentine Rococo fresco painter Giovanni Domenico Ferretti.

In 1708 he returned to Venice, completing a Madonna with the Child for San Giorgio Maggiore. In 1711, now painting alongside his nephew, Marco Ricci, he painted two canvases: Esther to Assuero and Moses saved from the Nile, for the Taverna Palace.

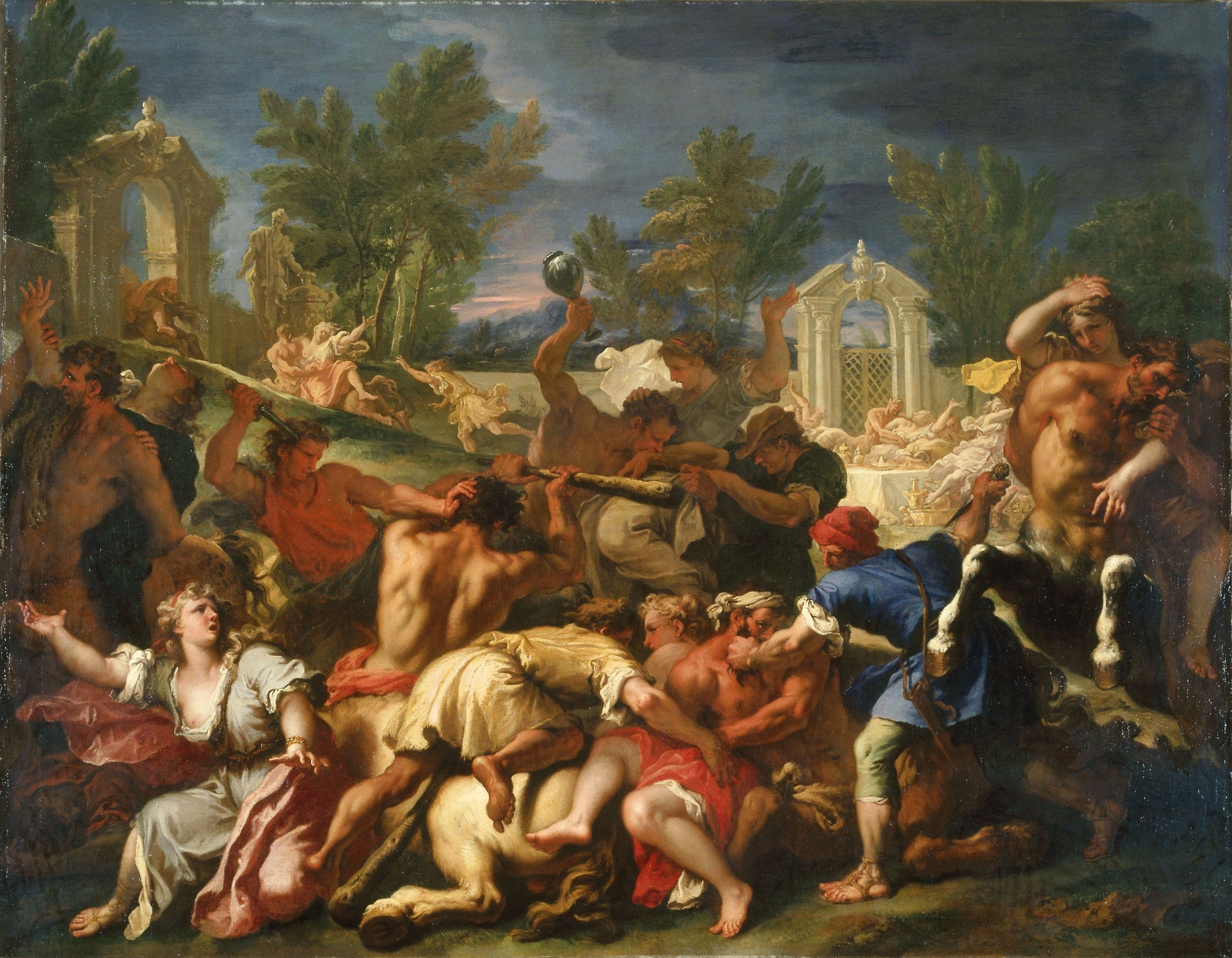
Battle of the Lapiths and Centaurs, circa 1705. (High Museum of Art)

== London and Paris ==
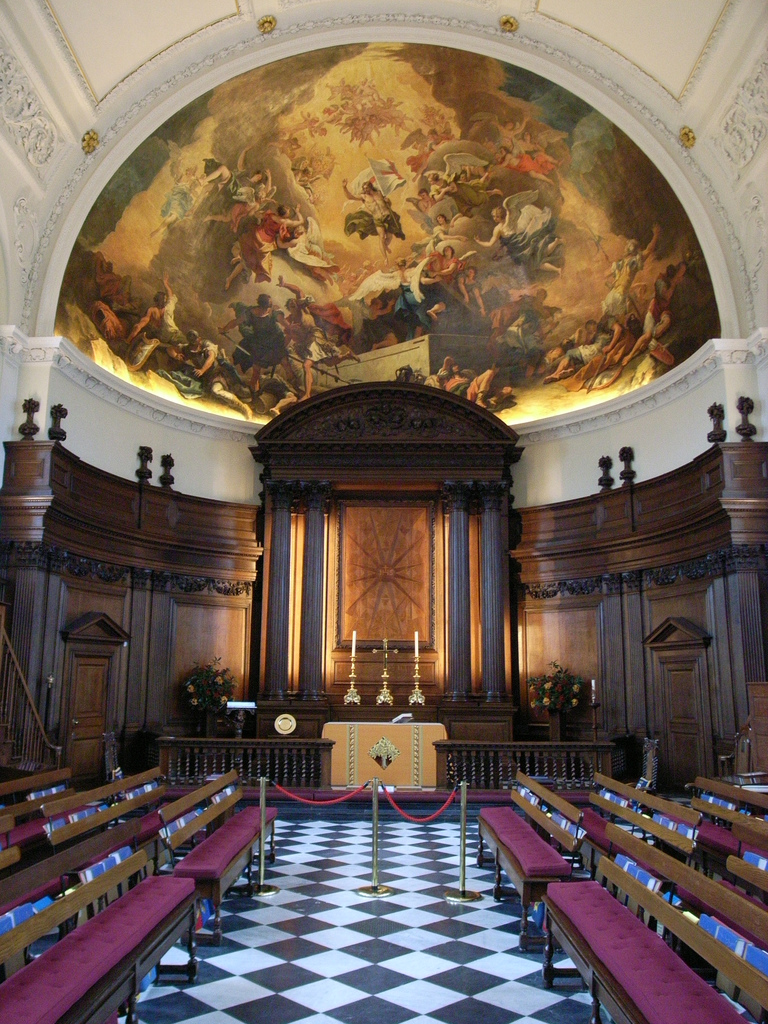
The apse of the chapel, Royal Hospital Chelsea, showing Ricci's painting of the Resurrection c. 1710–15

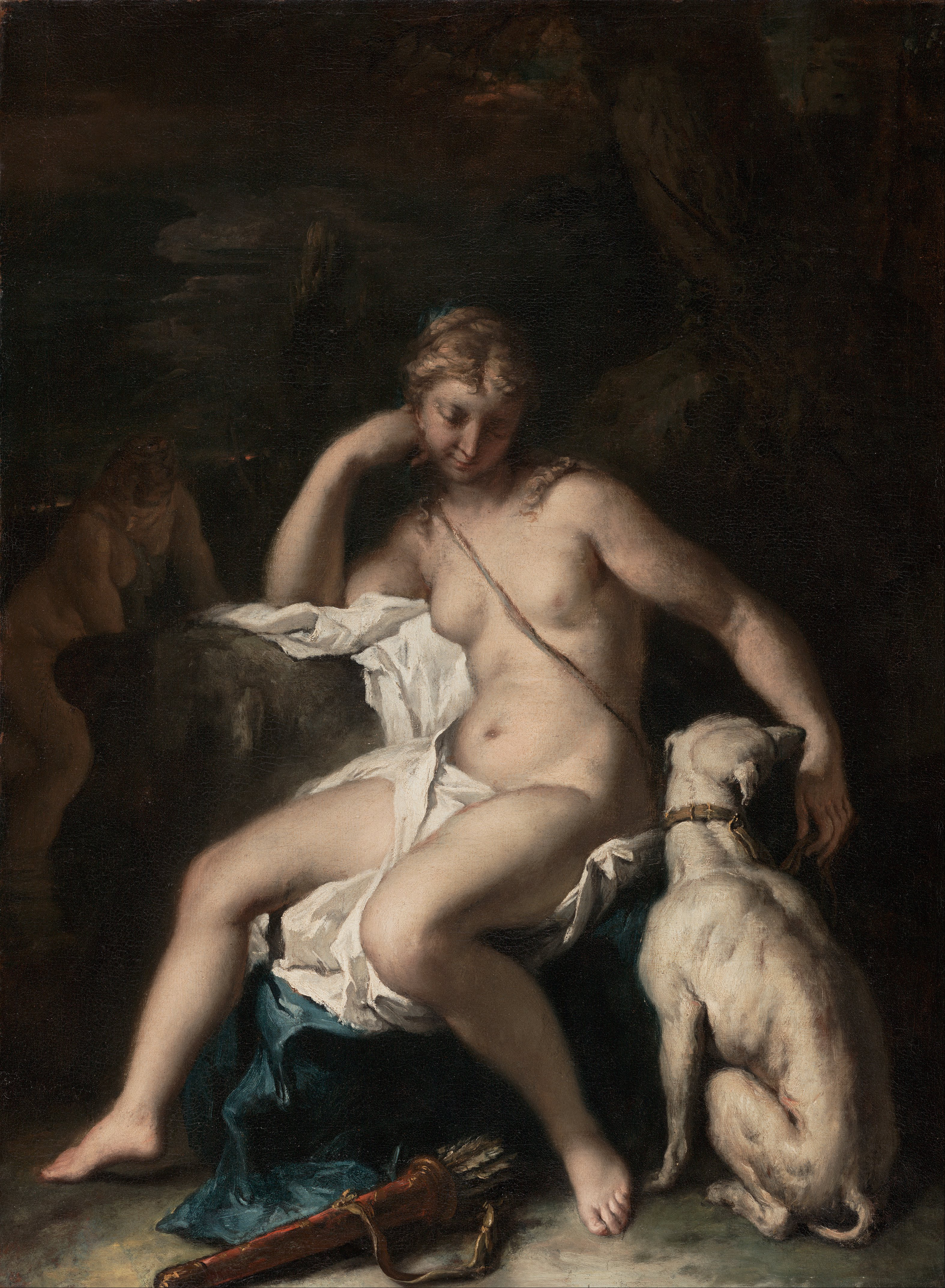
Diana and Her Dog

He ultimately accepted foreign patronage in London, when he was provided a £770 commission by Lord Burlington for eight canvases, to be completed by him and his nephew Marco, depicting mythological frolics: Cupid and Jove, Bacchus meets Ariadne, Diana and Nymphs, Bacchus and Ariadne, Venus and Cupid, Diane and Endymion, and a Cupid and Flora.

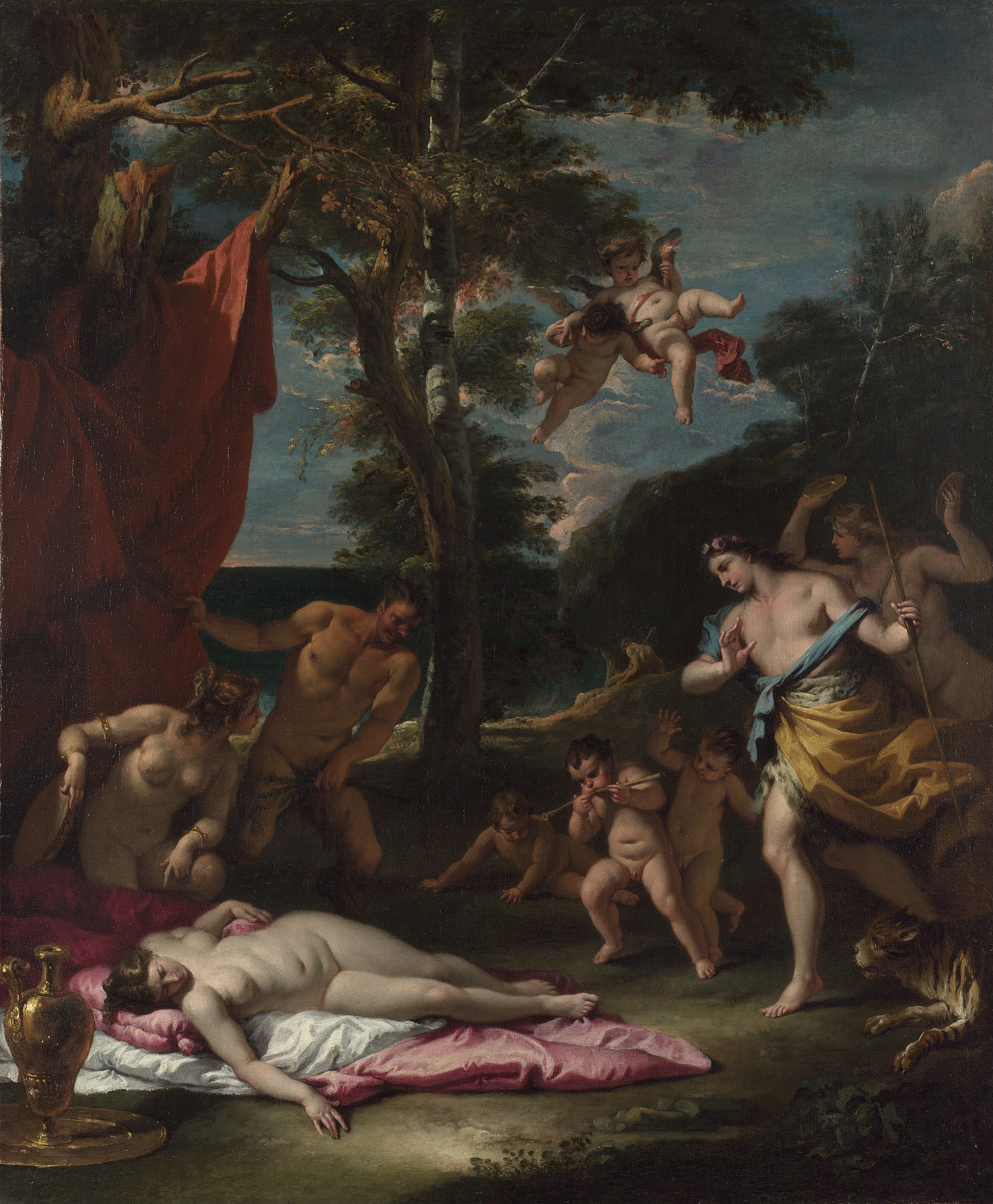
Bacchus and Ariadne

He decorated the chapel at Bulstrode House near Gerrards Cross for Henry Bentinck, 1st Duke of Portland with a cycle of wall-paintings depicting scenes from the life of Christ. George Vertue described the scheme as "a Noble free invention. great force of lights and shade, with variety & freedom, in the composition of the parts". The chapel was demolished in the 19th century, but oil modelli still exist. Ricci also designed stained glass for the Duke of Chandos' chapel at Cannons. In c. 1710–15 Ricci painted the apse in the chapel at the Royal Hospital Chelsea of the resurrection.

By the end of 1716, with his nephew, he left England for Paris, where he met Watteau, and submitted his Triumph of the Wisdom over Ignorance in order to gain admission to the Royal French Academy of Painting and Sculpture, which was granted on 18 May 1718. He returned to Venice in 1718 a wealthy man, and bought comfortable lodgings in the Old Procuratory of St. Mark. That same year, the Riccis decorated the villa of Giovanni Francesco Bembo in Belvedere, near Belluno. In 1722 he was one of twelve artists commissioned to contribute a painting on canvas of one of the apostles as part of a decorative scheme at the church of St Stae in Venice. The other artists involved included Tiepolo, Piazetti, and Pellegrini.

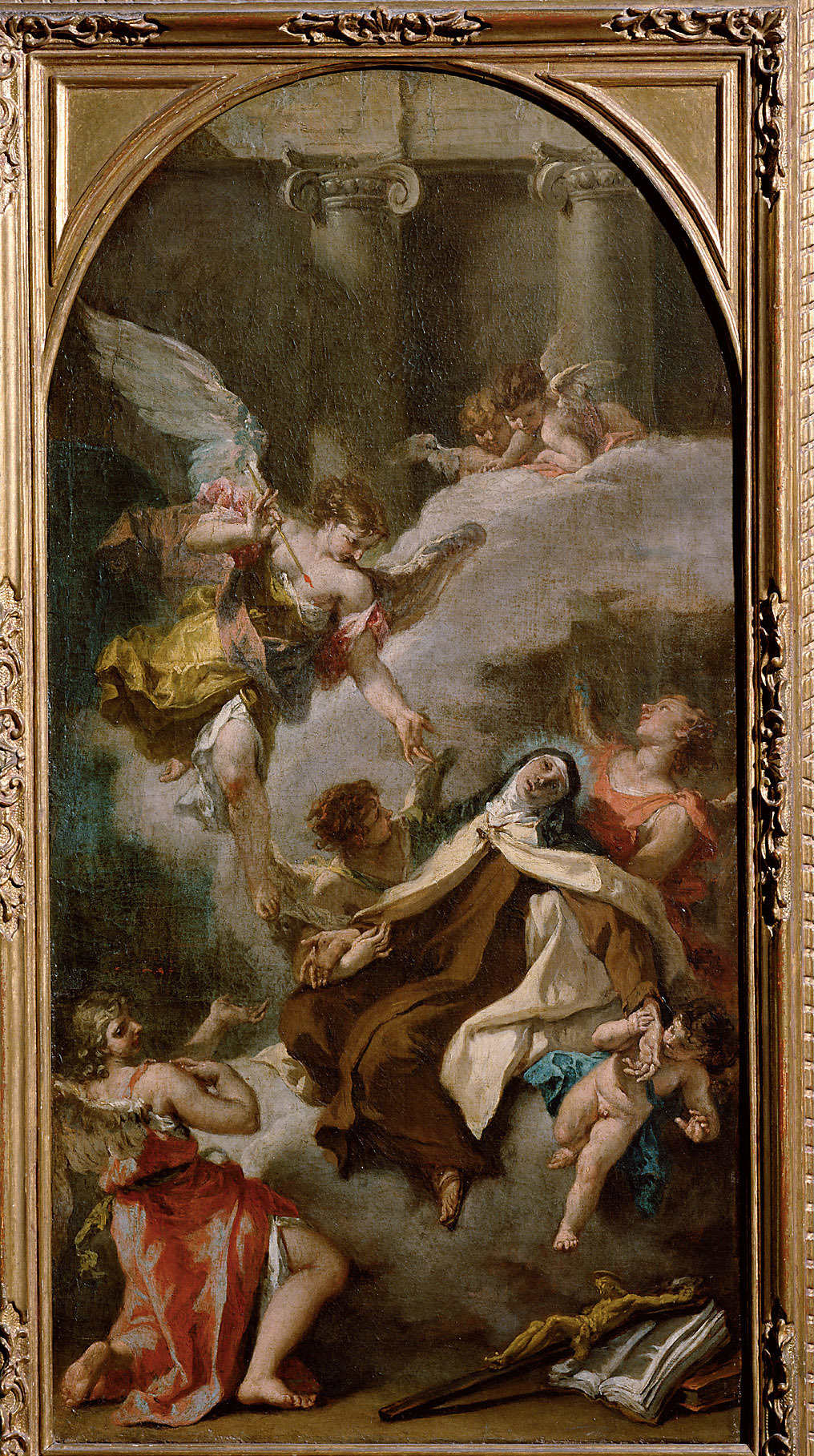
Vision der Hl. Therese von Avila Kunsthistorisches Museum

== Last years ==
From 1724 to 1729, Ricci worked intensely for the Royal House of Savoy in Turin. In 1724 he painted the Rejection of Agar and the Silenus adores the Idols, in 1725, the Madonna in Gloria, in Turin in 1726, he completed Susanna presented to Daniel and Moses causes water to gush from the rock. In October 1727 he was admitted to the Clementine Academy of Venice.

Ricci's style developed a following among other Venetian artists, influencing Francesco Polazzo, Gaspare Diziani, Francesco Migliori, Gaetano Zompini, and Francesco Fontebasso (1709–1769).

He died in Venice on 15 May 1734.

== Veronese copies ==
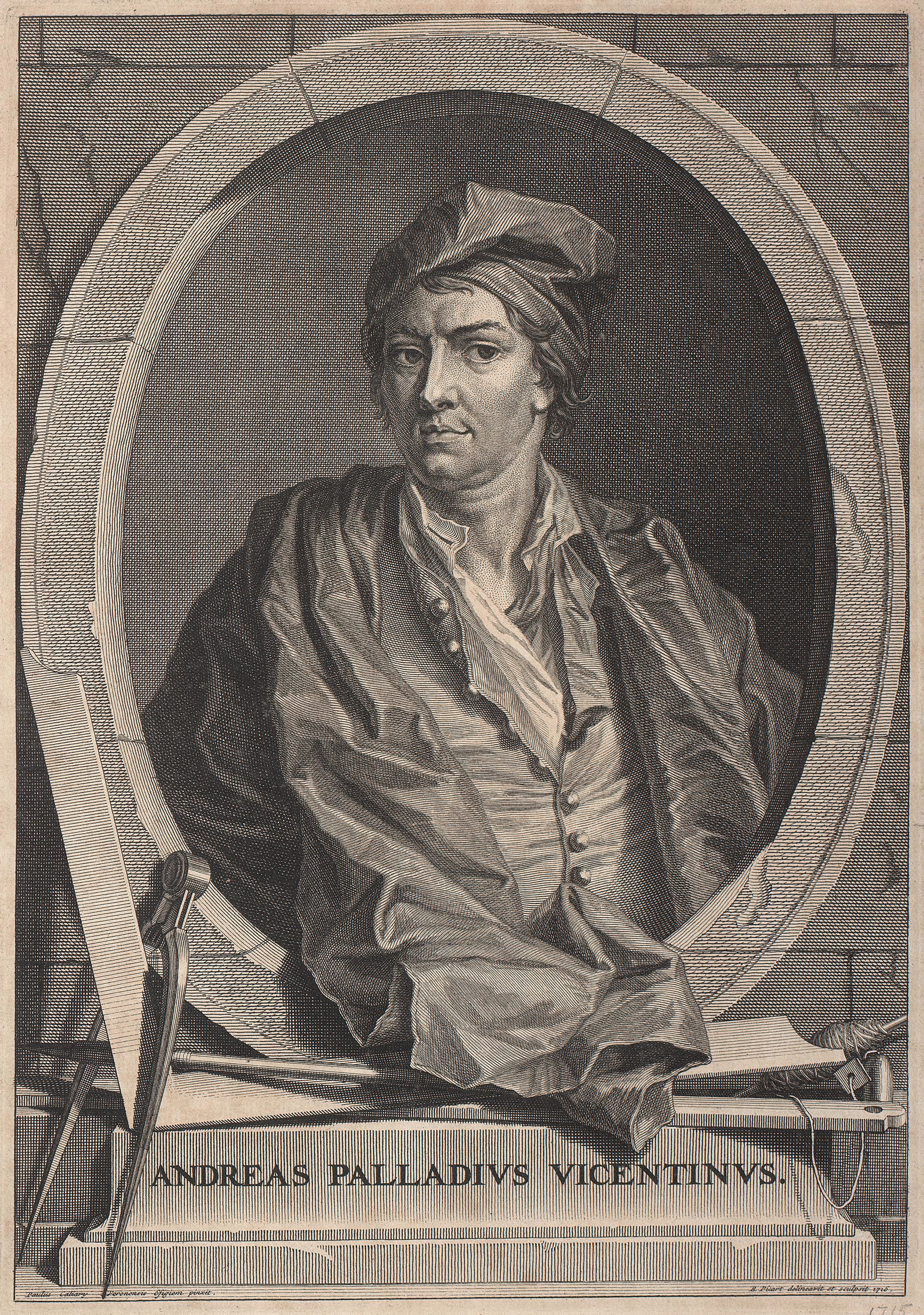
Fake portrait of Palladio attributed to Veronese, frontispiece to The Architecture of A. Palladio, 1715, engraved by Bernard Picart after Ricci

Ricci made many copies from the works of Paolo Veronese, both of individual heads and of whole compositions. Some of these copies of heads were bought by George III. The king also bought a painting of the Finding of Moses which his agent, Joseph Smith, claimed was a Veronese, although this too had been painted by Ricci, either as a pastiche of Veronese's style, or a copy of a work now lost. Ricci painted a supposed portrait of Andrea Palladio, attributed to Veronese and engraved by Bernard Picart for the frontispiece of the first English edition (1715) of Palladio's Four Books of Architecture. According to Rudolf Wittkower, it does not depict Palladio, but rather is entirely the invention of Ricci.

== Critical assessments ==
"Ricci, leaning at first on the example of splendid art of the Veronese, made a new ideal prevail, one of clear and rich coloristic beauty: in this he paved the way for Tiepolo. The painting of figures of the Roccoco to Venice remains incomprehensible in its evolution without Ricci... Tiepolo germinated the work started by Ricci to such a richness and splendor that it leaves Ricci in the shadows... although Sebastiano is recognized in the combative role of forerunner" (Derschau).

"He is the master of a resurrected-fifteenth century style, whose painterly features are enriched with nervous express and, typically 17th century" (Rudolf Wittkower). Wittkower in his Anthology, contrasts the facile luminous style of Ricci with the darker, more emotional intense painting of Piazzetta. Like Tiepolo, Ricci was an international artist; Piazzetta was local.

"We perceive in him that synthesis of the baroque decorativeness and individualized and substantial painting, that we will see later again in Tiepolo. On one side the influence of Cortona, directed and indirect, and on the other the observant painting of the hermit Magnasco; more intense, substantial and freed academic impulses, the airy, shining influences become, to the open air, magical coves, as well as gloomy corners. A new synthesis that opened wide new painting horizons, even if the scene is not that of a ballet, it is felt like bing in the wonders of the color, in more vibrating, acute, agile accents" (Moschini).

"At the start of the Baroque..Venetians remained isolated from the outside…from the great ideas of the baroque painting… The Ricci are the first traveling Venetian painters... and succeed to inaugurate the so-called roccoco rooms of Pitti and Marucelli palaces." (Roberto Longhi).

Ricci "brought back in the Venetian tradition a wealth of chromatic expression resolved in a new vibrating brilliance brightness…by means of the intelligent interpretation of the Veronese chromatics and of the brushstrokes of a Magnasco-like touch, from the 16th century impediments, he takes unfashionable positions against "tenebrous styles", is against the new Piazzetta – Federico Bencovich. He supplied a valid painterly idiom for ... Tiepolo to use after his defection from the Piazzettism" (Pallucchini).

"Venice, still more than Naples, collects the Ricci inheritance of the prodigioso trade of Luca Giordano... Sebastiano throws again it, widens he then, refines it for the school of Sebastiano Mazzoni" (Argan)

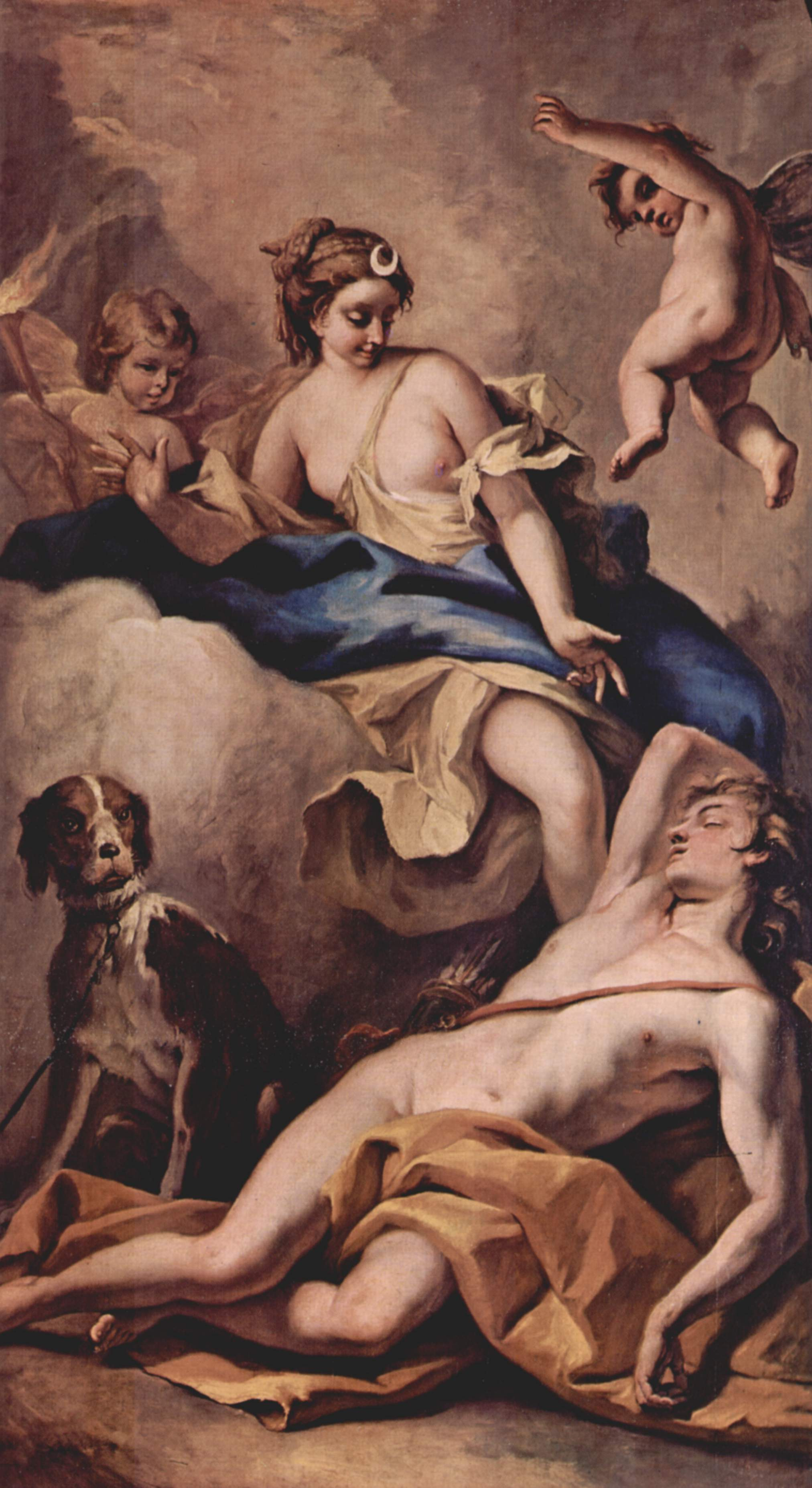

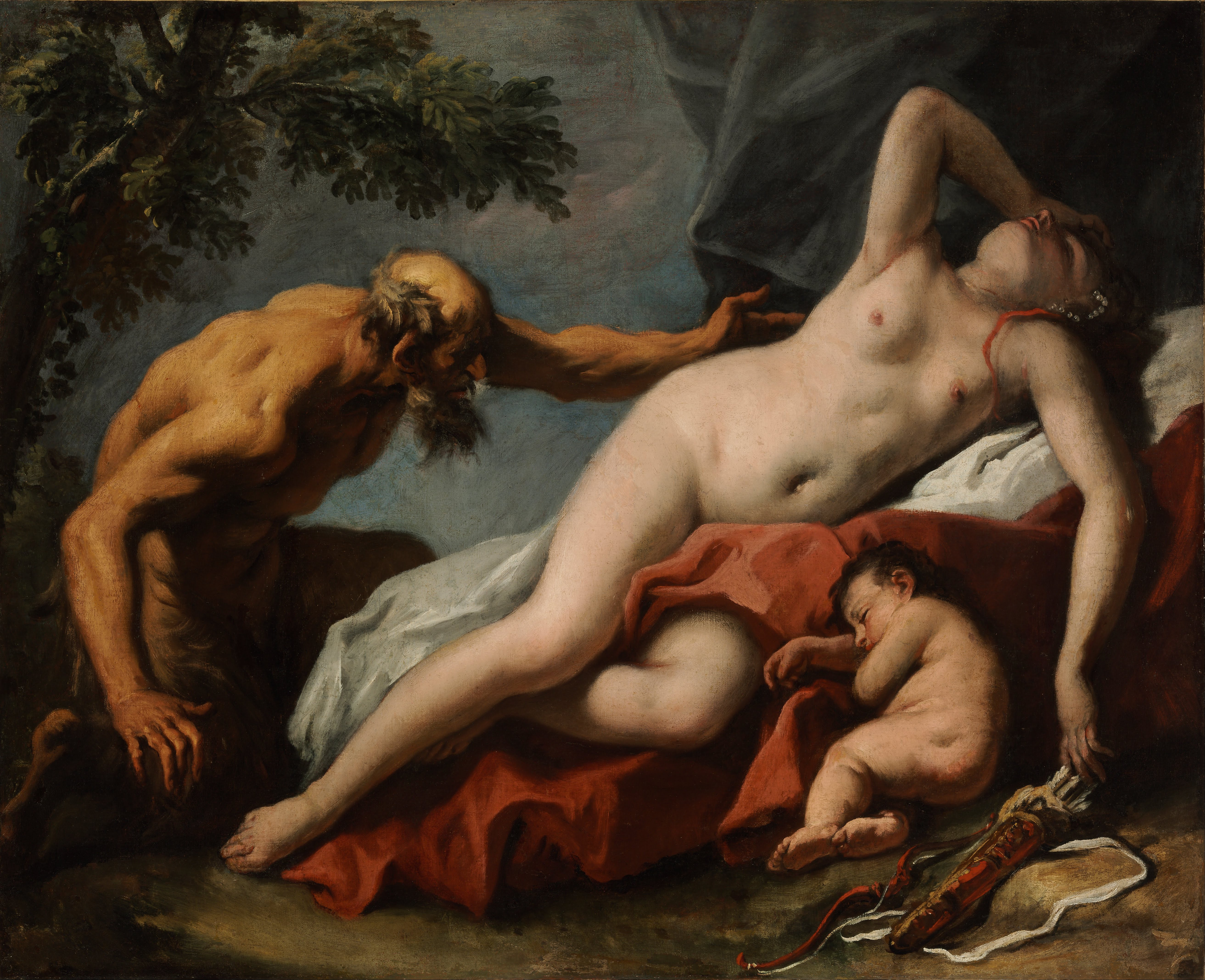
Venus and Satyr

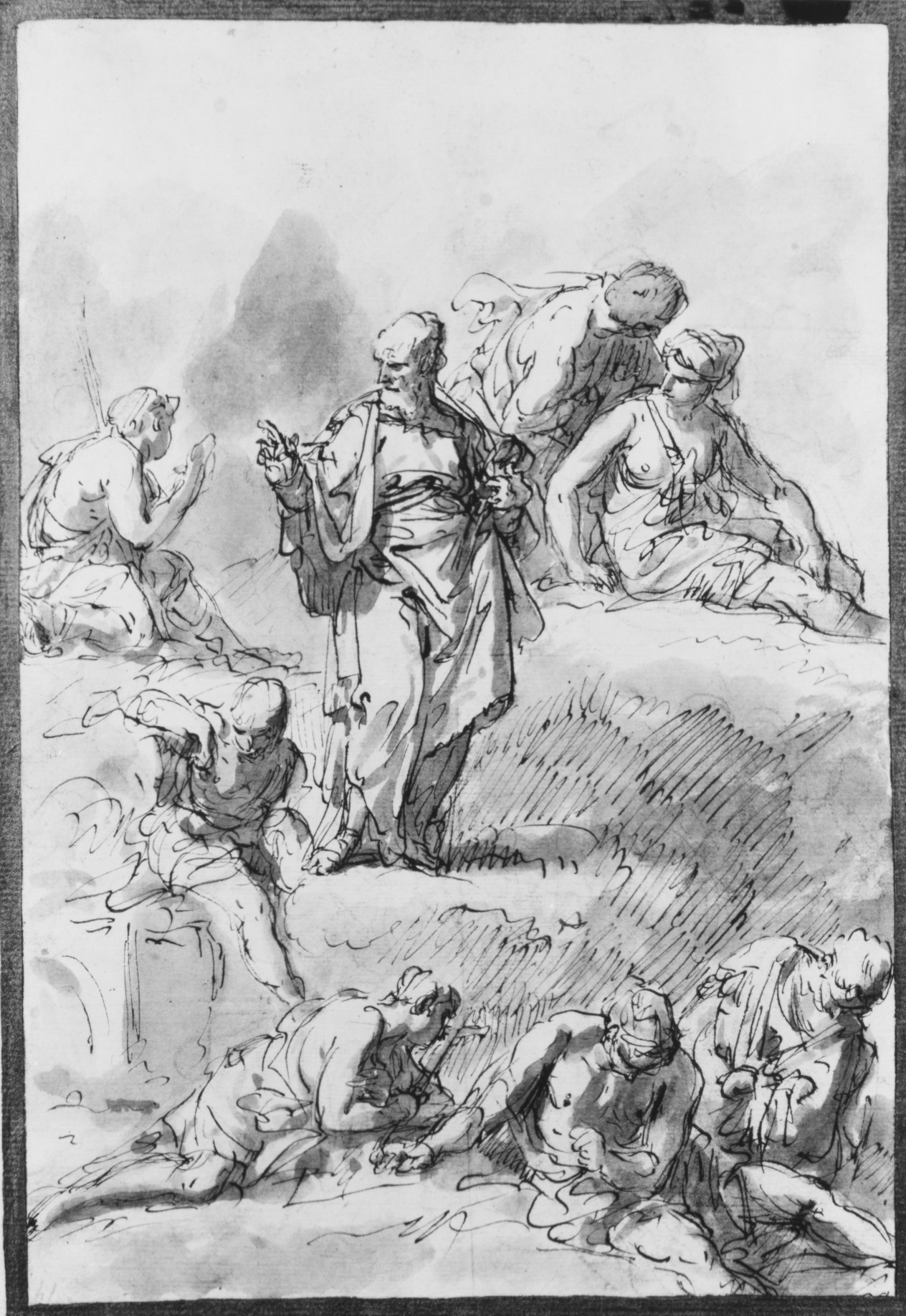
(between 1659 and 1734)

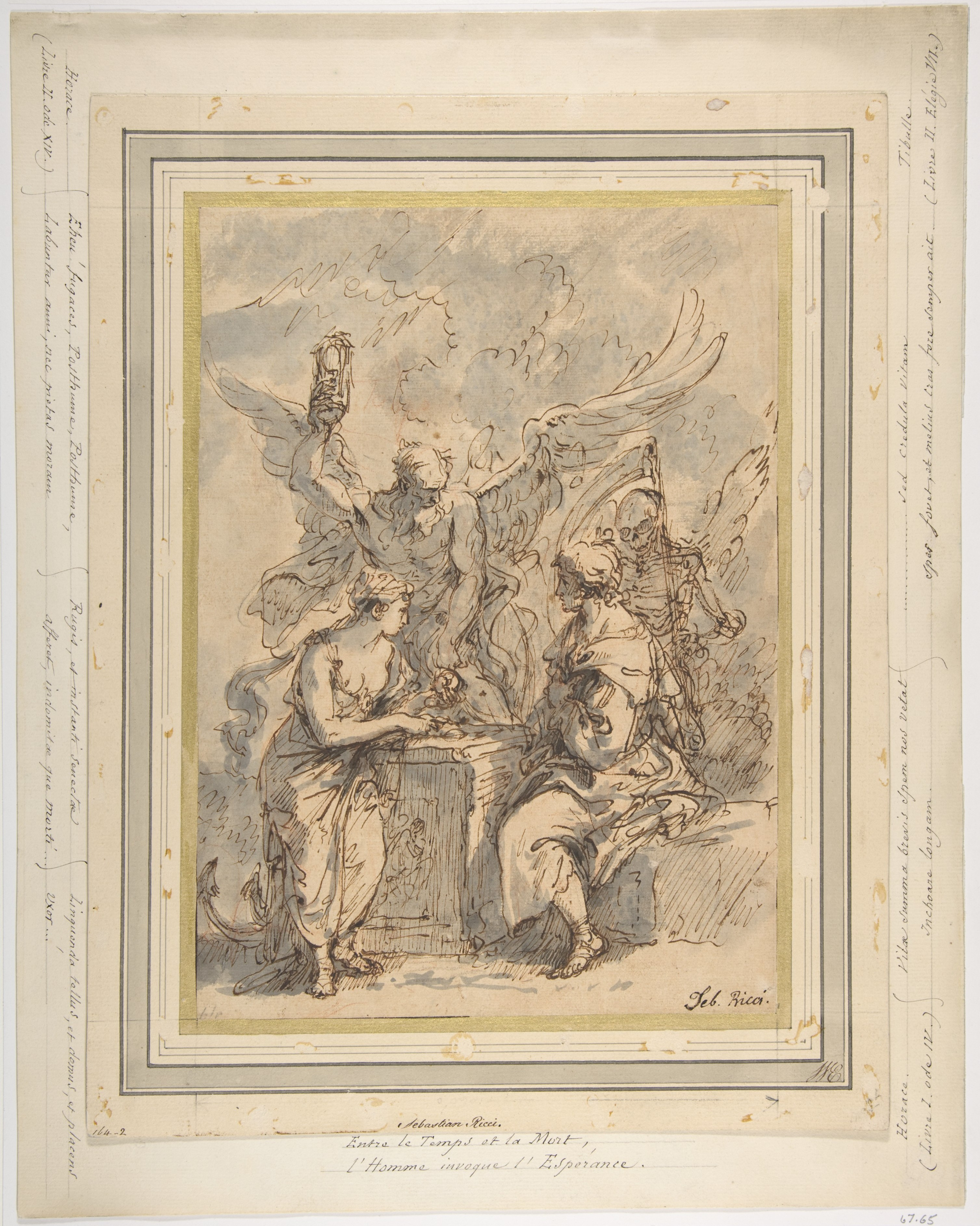
Allegory with Figures of Hope, Time, and Death (between 1659 and 1734)

== Works/Gallery ==
- Portrait of a Bishop, Landesmuseum Ferdinandeum, Innsbruck
- Mercy (1686), New Church of the Capuchins, Parma
- Frescoes in collaboration with Bibiena, (1687) Sacristy of the Fallen in Church of San Secondo, Parma
- History and Apotheosis of Paul III (1687–1688), Farnese Palace, now Pinacoteca Civica, Piacenza
- Guardian Angel (1694), Chiesa del Carmine, Pavia
- Frescoes (1695), Church of San Bernardino alle Ossa, Milan
- Ecstasy of St Francis (circa 1695–1696), Tweed Museum of Art, Duluth, Minnesota
- Last Supper (c. 1720), Museum of Fine Arts, Houston, Texas
- Frescoes (1697), Duomo of Monza
- Communion of St Maria Egiziaca (1698), Archconfraternity of the Duomo of the Santa Sindone, Milan
- St Gregory the Great intercedes with Madonna (1700), Church of Santa Giustina, Padua
- Frescoes (1700), Church of Santa Giustina, Padua
- Ascension (1701), Santi Apostoli, Rome
- Allegory of the princely virtues (1702), Schönbrunn Palace, Vienna
- Assumption of Virgin (1702) Gemäldegalerie, Dresden
- Crucifixion with Virgin, John the Evangelist and Carlo Borromeo (1704), Uffizi, Florence
- Procolo, Peasant Detention (1704), Duomo, Bergamo)
- Vision of St. Bruno (1705)
- Frescoes (1706–1707), Palazzi Fenzi Marucelli and Pitti, Florence
- Madonna with Child (1708), San Giorgio Maggiore, Venice)
- Family of Darius before Alexander and Continence of Scipio (ca 1709), North Carolina Museum of Art, Raleigh
- Liberation of Saint Peter (1710), Trescore Balneario, Bergamo, church of Saint Peter)(San Stae)
- Christ giving the keys to St Peter and Call of St Peter (1710), San Pietro, Bergamo
- Assumption (1710), Santa Maria Maggiore, Bergamo)
- Esther before Ahasuerus (1711), Palazzo Taverna, Rome
- Moses saved from the waters (1711)
- Sacred Family with Elizabeth and John (1712), Royal Collections, London
- Frescoes for Burlington House (1712–1714), London
  - Cupid before Jove; Encounter of Bacchus and Ariadne; and Triumph of Galatea
- Frescoes for Chiswick House (1712–1714), London
  - Bacchus and Ariadne (c. 1713) (National Gallery)
  - Venus and Cupid, Diana and Endymion, Cupid and Flora and Diana and Nymphs
- Selene & Endymion (1713), London
- The Resurrection (1714), Royal Hospital Chelsea, London
- Triumph of Wisdom over Ignorance (1718), Louvre, Paris
- Head of Woman (1718), fresco fragment, Civic Museum, Belluno
- Bathsheba at her Bath (1724), Szépművészeti Múzeum, Budapest
- Sabauda Gallery, Turin
  - Repudiation of Agar and Solomon adores the Idols (1724)
  - Madonna in Glory with archangel Gabriel and Saints Eusebio, Sebastiano & Rocco (1725)
  - Susanna in front of Daniel and Moses make water gush from the rock (1726)
  - Magdalen applies ointment to Christ's feet (1728)
- Apotheosis of Saint Sebastian (circa 1725), Musée des Beaux-Arts, Strasbourg
- St Cajetan heals the Sick (1727), Brera Gallery, Milan
- Ecstasy of St. Teresa (1727, Church of St Jerome (now St Mark), Vicenza)
- Royal Palace, Turin
  - Hagar in the desert; Jacob blesses the sons of Joseph; Moses saved from waters; and Rebecca and Eliazer at the well (1727)
- Christ and the Centurions and Wedding at Cannae (1729), Capodimonte Museum, Naples
- Communion and Martyrdom of St Lucia (1730), Church of Santa Lucia, Parma
- Immaculate Conception (1730), Church of San Vitale, Venice
- Madonna in Glory with Child and Angel Guardian, (1730) Scuola of the Guardian Angel, Venice
- Prayer in Garden (1730), Kunsthistorisches Museum, Vienna
- Self-portrait (1731), Uffizi Gallery
- Pope Gregory the Great intercedes with Virgin (1731), Sant'Alessandro della Croce, Bergamo
- Pope Gregory the Great intercedes for souls in Purgatory (1733), Saint Gervais, Paris
- Pope Pio V, Saints Thomas Acquinus, & Peter Martyr (1733), Gesuati, Venice
- St Francis from resuscitates child Paola and St Helen discovers True Cross, San Rocco Church, Venice
- Baldassarre and Ester before Ahasuerus (1733), Quirinal Palace, Rome
- Assumption (1734) Karlskirche, Vienna

== Sources ==
- Free translation from Italian Wikipedia entry
- Giambattista Tiepolo 1698–1770 (Exhibition catalogue). New York: Metropolitan Museum of Art. 1996.
- Nash, Paul W.; Savage, Nicholas (1999); Early Printed Books 1478–1840: Catalogue of the British Architectural Library, Early Imprints Collection, London: Bowker-Saur (ISBN 9781857390186).
- Rizzi, Aldo; Sebastiano Ricci disegnatore, Electa – Milano 1975
- Rizzi, Aldo; Sebastiano Ricci, Electa – Milano 1989
- Wittkower, Rudolf (1974); Palladio and English Palladianism, London: Thames and Hudson (ISBN 9780500850015).
- Wittkower, Rudolf (1993). Art and Architecture in Italy, 1600–1750. Penguin Books. pp. 480–482.
