= Sebastiano Mazzoni =

Italian painter (1611-1678)

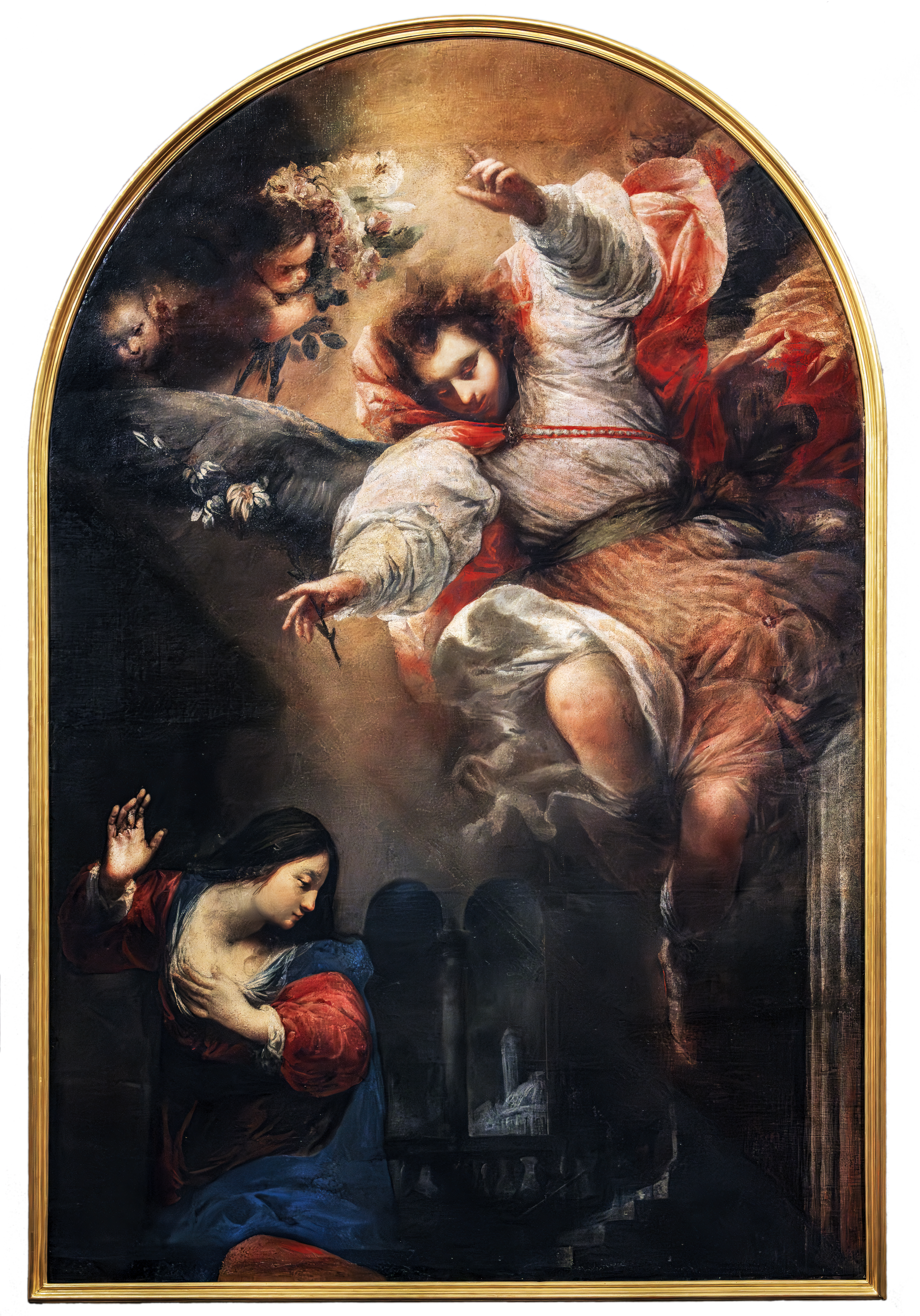
- Annunciation (c. 1645–50), Gallerie dell'Accademia Venice
- Born: c. 1611; Florence, Grand Duchy of Tuscany
- Died: 22 April 1678 (aged 66–67); Venice, Republic of Venice
- Education: Baccio del Bianco
- Known for: Painting
- Movement: Mannerism; Baroque

Sebastiano Mazzoni (c. 1611 – Venice, 22 April 1678) was an Italian painter of the Baroque period.

== Biography ==
Born in Florence, he trained in that city during 1632-33 in the studio of Baccio del Bianco. In 1638 he entered the Accademia delle Arti del Disegno, Florence. He developed an enigmatic individual style with paintings of unresolved dynamism, depicted from awkward perspectives, in some fashion resembling his contemporary Francesco Maffei or evoking the distortions of a Lorenzo Lotto of the prior century.

Between 1646, when he is documented in Florence, and 1648, Mazzoni moved to Venice, where he stayed till his death. There he signed and dated two altarpieces for the church of San Beneto: St. Benedict Presenting a Priest to the Virgin (1648) and St. Benedict in Glory among the Theological Virtues (1649). Susanna and the Elders (priv. col.) is also dated 1649. In Venice he became a close friend of Pietro Liberi, and, influenced by Fetti, Johann Liss and, above all, Strozzi, led the painterly, Baroque movement that became established in Venice at that time.

His works of the 1650s, which include the Annunciation (Venice, Gallerie dell'Accademia) and the Disputation on the Arts (two versions; Venice, priv. col.; Chaalis, Musée Jacquemart André), are already Baroque in feeling, and the works painted around 1660, which include Cleopatra’s Banquet (1660; Washington, DC, Smithsonian Institution, on loan to Washington, DC, National Gallery of Art), the Sacrifice of Jephthah (Kansas City, Nelson-Atkins Museum of Art) and the Death of Cleopatra (Rovigo, Accademia dei Concordi), are distinguished by dramatic movement and violent contrasts of light and dark. In their grandiose, theatrical effects and vibrant, broken brushwork, these pictures brilliantly anticipate aspects of 18th-century Venetian painting.

In Mazzoni’s last works, such as the Dream of Pope Honorius III (1669; Venice, Santa Maria del Carmine), space is unclear and irrational and the increasingly visionary mood is inspired by Tintoretto. Mazzoni died in Venice on 22 April 1678. Andrea Celesti was one of his pupils. Mazzoni influenced the style of Sebastiano Ricci and Ghislandi.

== Sources ==
- "Mazzoni, Sebastiano". Artnet. Archived from the original on 25 May 2004.
- "MAZZONI, Sebastiano". Web Gallery of Art.
- Ivanoff, Nicola (1956). "A Sebastiano Ricci 'Rape of the Sabines'". The Burlington Magazine. 98 (634): 18–21. JSTOR 871778.

== Partial anthology ==
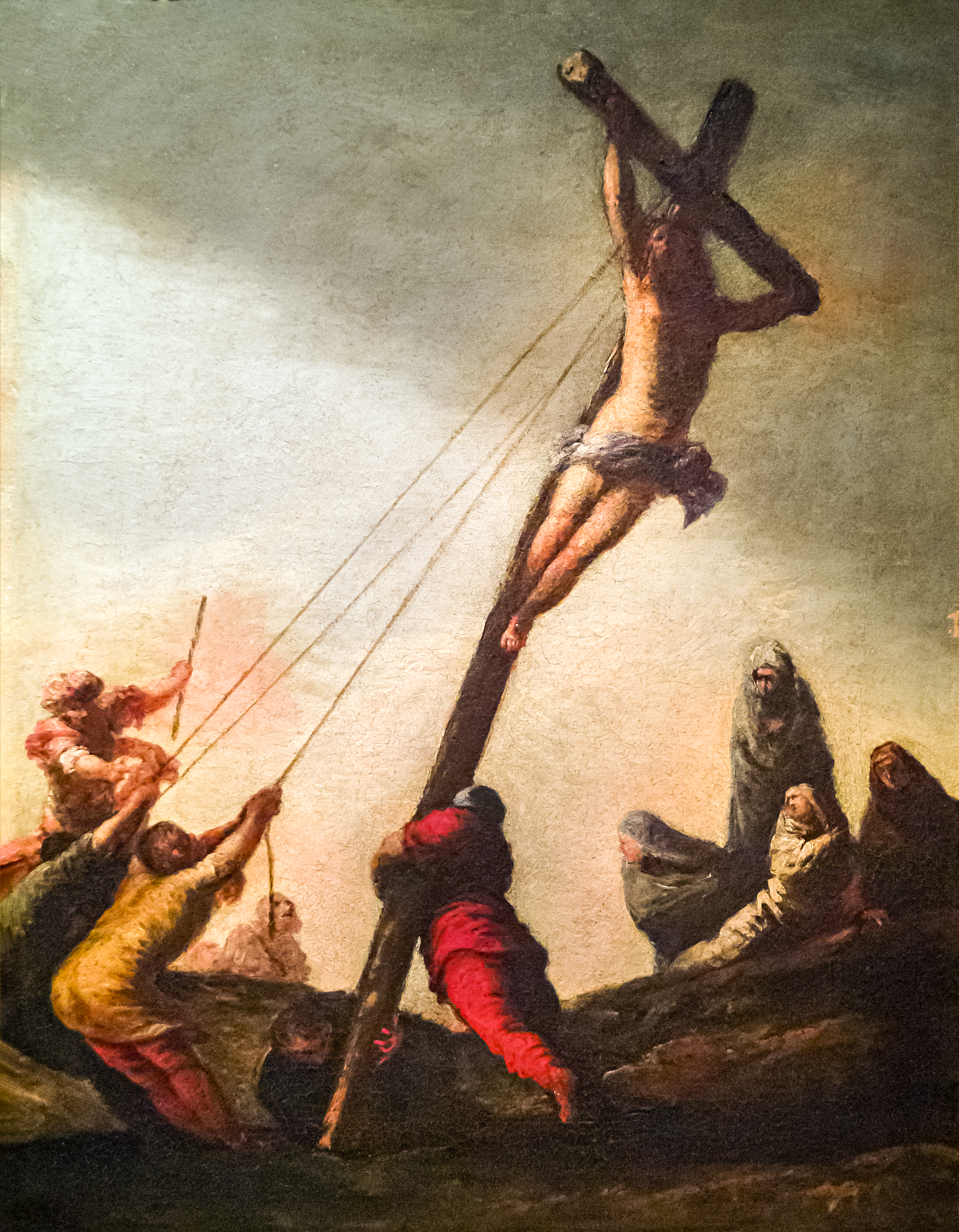
Raising of the Cross, Ca' Rezzonico, Venice

- Allegories of Summer and Winter, Palazzo Arcivescovile, Florence;
- Death of Cleopatra, Accademia dei Concordi, Rovigo;
- Lot and his Daughters, Accademia dei Concordi, Rovigo;
- Venus and Mars Surprised by Vulcan, priv. col.;
- Annunciation, Gallerie dell'Accademia, Venice;
- Saint Catherine Refuses to Worship Idols, Gallerie dell'Accademia, Venice;
- Saint Benedict Brought to Glory by the Theological Virtues, Fine Arts Museum of Nantes;
- The Dispute of the Arts, Musée Jacquemart André, Chaalis Abbey;
- Cleopatra’s Banquet, Smithsonian Institution, Washington, D.C.;
- Sacrifice of Jephthah, Nelson-Atkins Museum of Art, Kansas City;
- Venus and Cupid, Navarro priv. col., New York;
- Dream of Pope Honorius III, Santa Maria del Carmine, Venice;
- The Three Fates, Barber Institute of Fine Arts, Birmingham;
- Scene of Sacrifice, Detroit Institute of Arts.

== Gallery ==
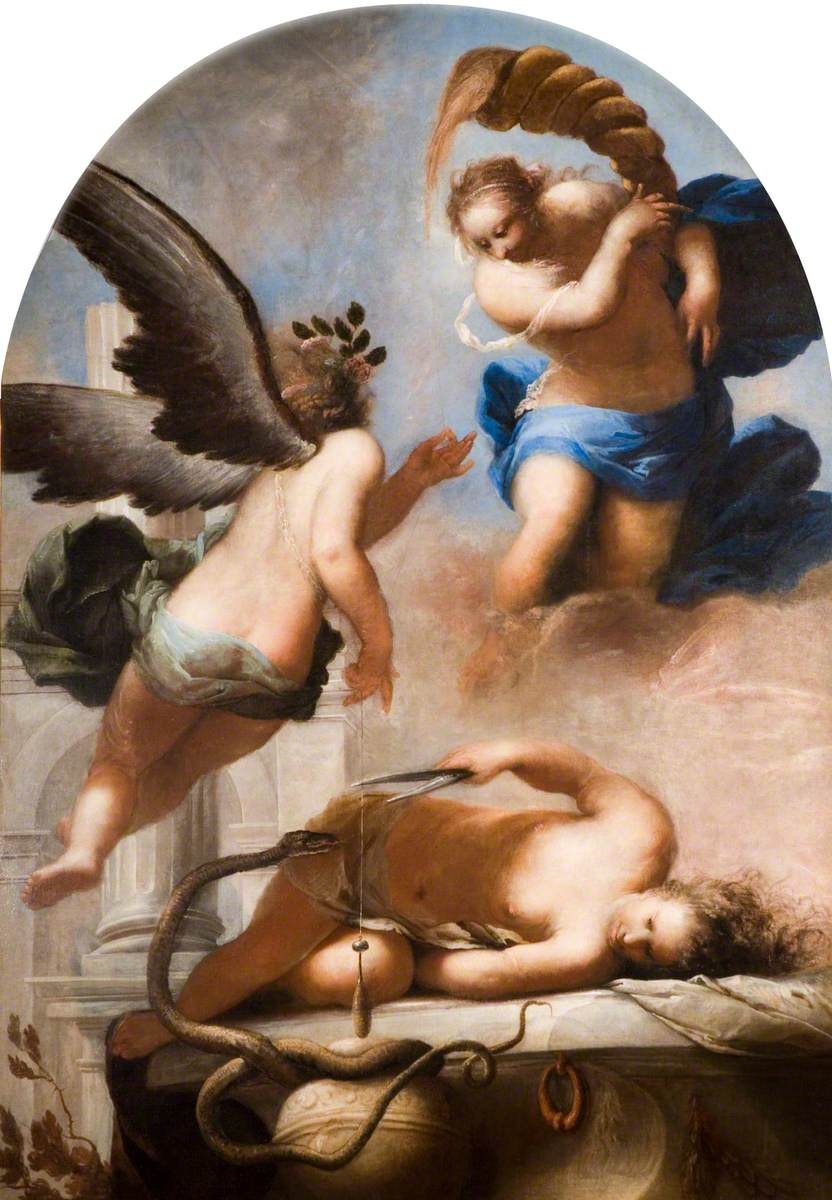
The Three Fates, Barber Institute of Fine Arts

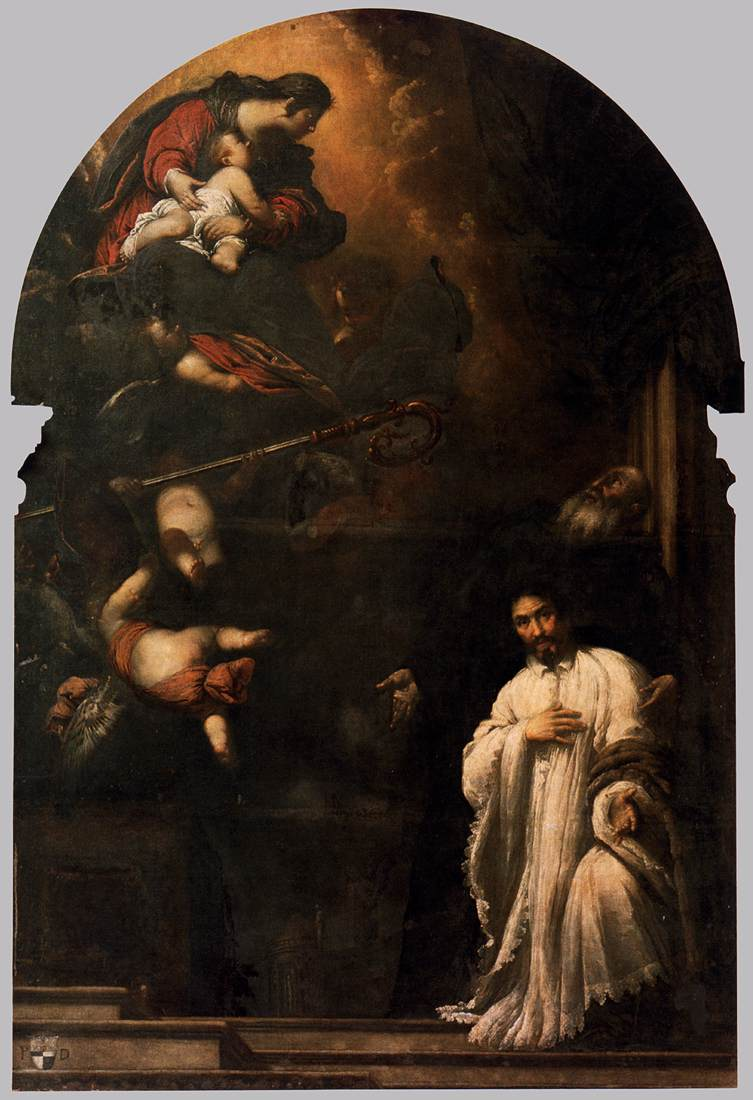
St. Benedict Presents Pasqualino Daneli to the Virgin, San Beneto, Venice

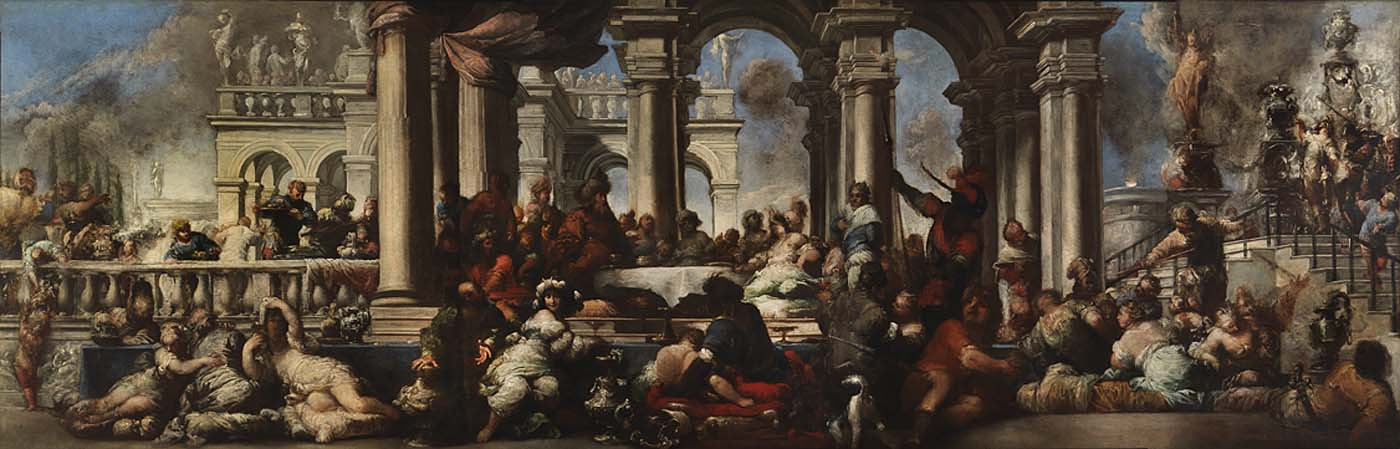
Cleopatra’s Banquet, Smithsonian Institution, Washington, D.C.

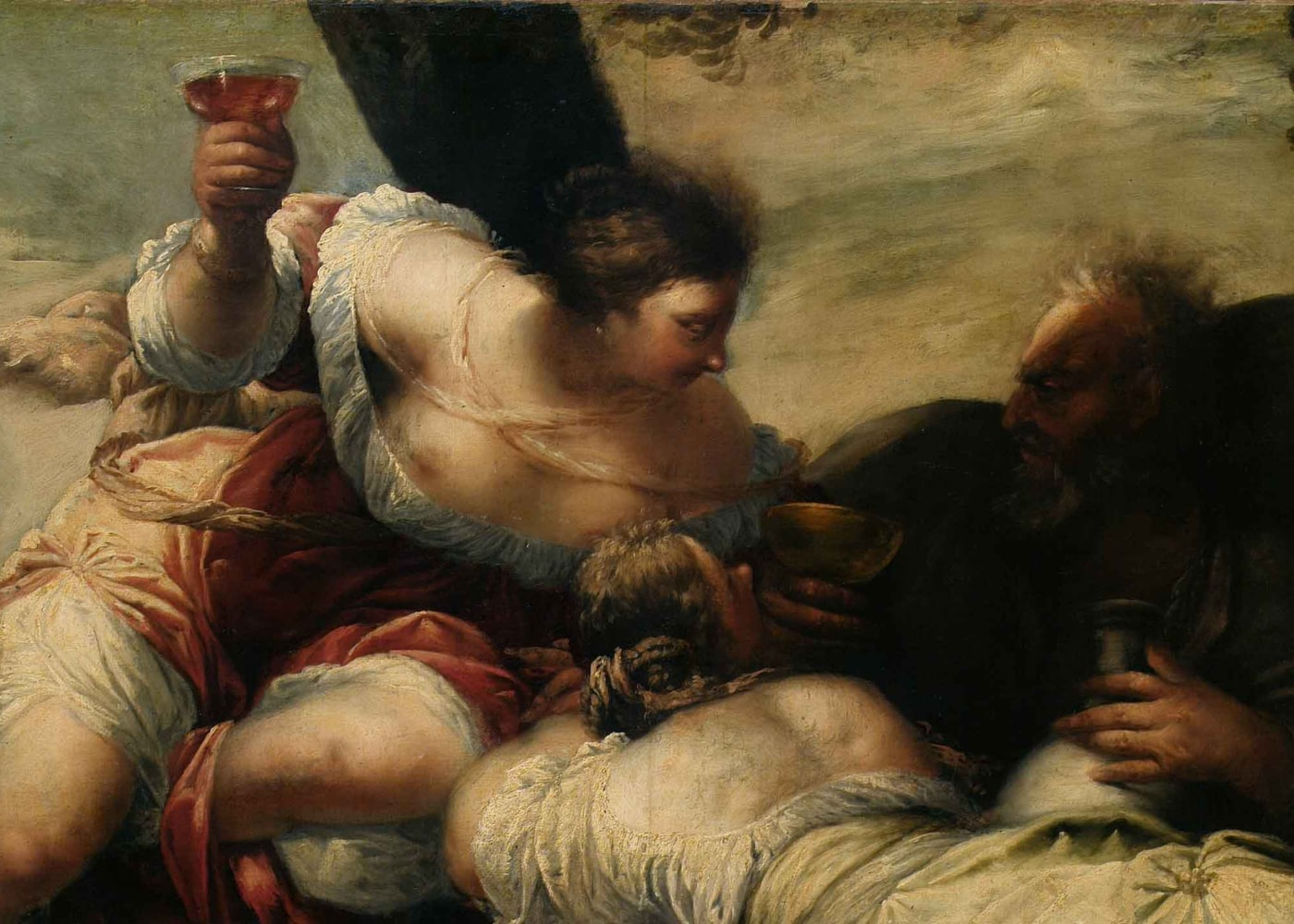
Lot and his Daughters, Pinacoteca dell’Accademia dei Concordi, Rovigo

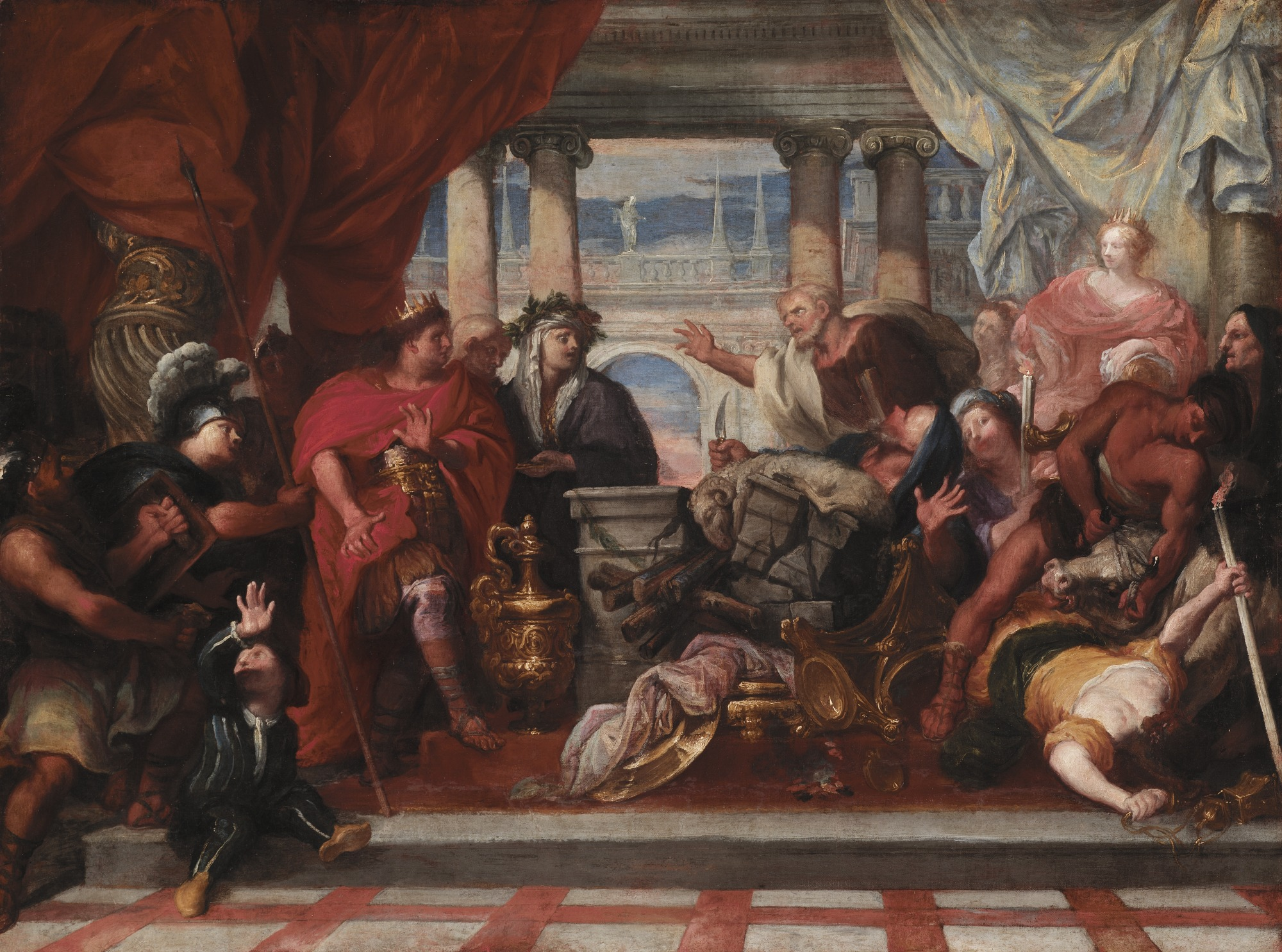
Scene of Sacrifice, Detroit Institute of Arts

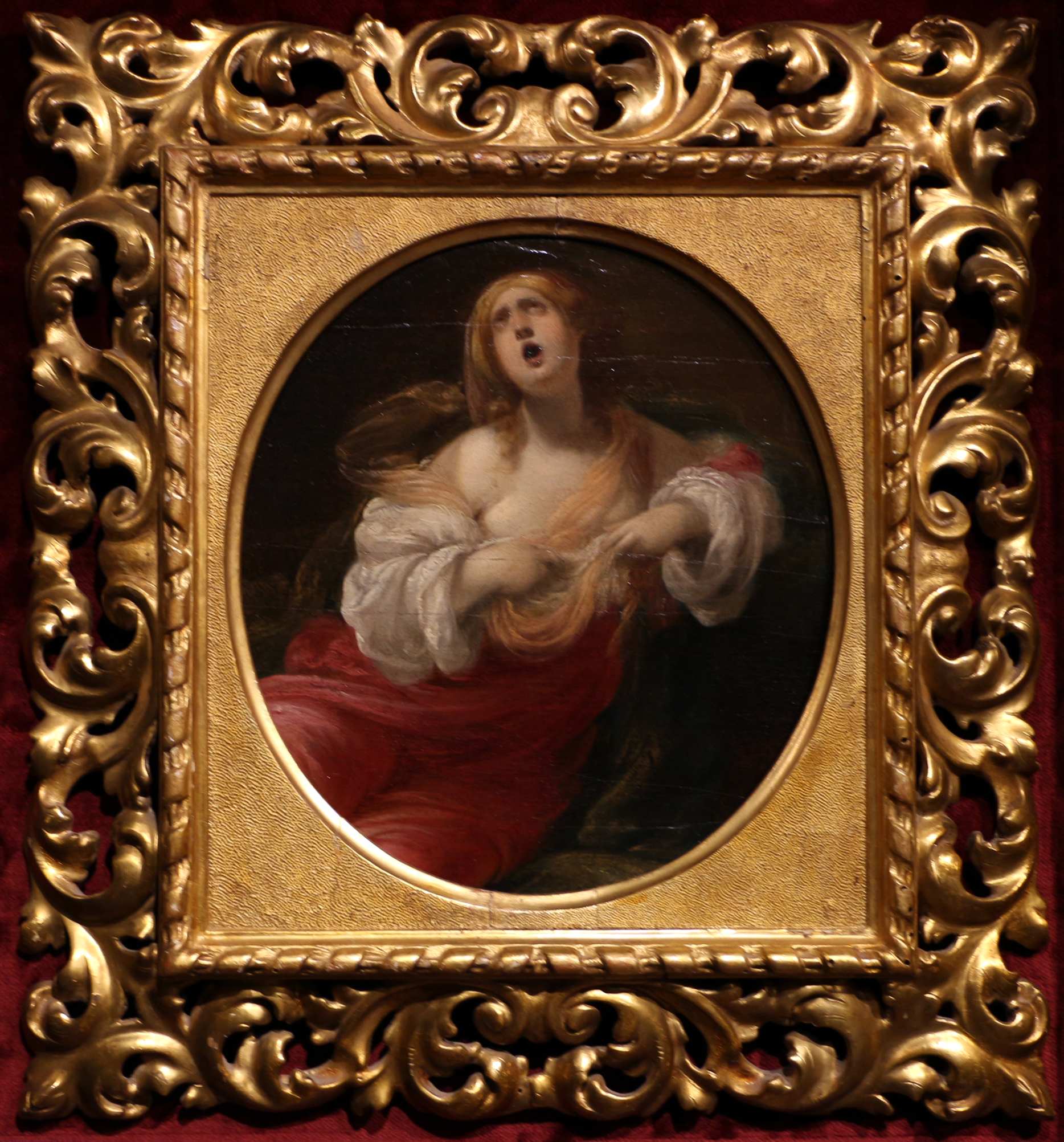
Cleopatra, Florence, priv. coll.
