= Sanctuary of the Blessed Virgin of the Sorrows, Rho =

Church in Lombardy, Italy

Coordinates: 45°31′58.9″N 9°02′19.9″E

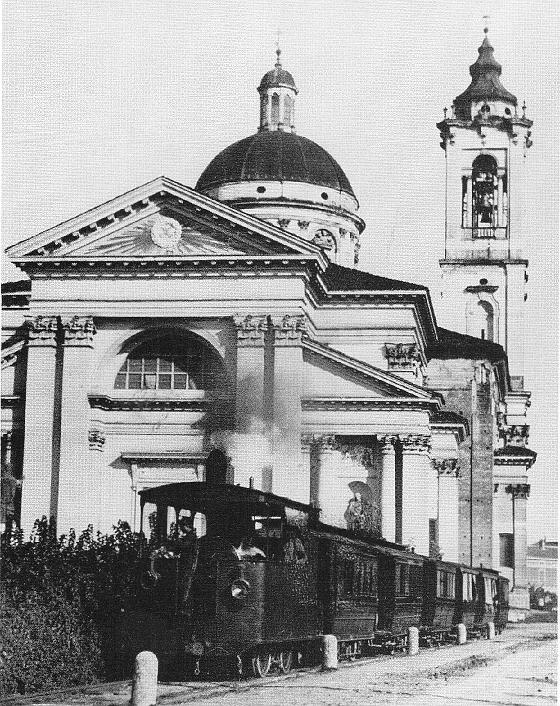
Tram (1910) and facade of church of the Madonna Addolorata at Rho

The Sanctuary of the Blessed Virgin of the Sorrows of Rho (in Italian:Santuario della Beata Vergine Addolorata di Rho) is a Roman Catholic Marian shrine just outside the historic center of the town of Rho, region of Lombardy, Italy. The church is under the administration of the Oblates of Saints Ambrose and Charles.

== History and description ==
The site formerly had a small chapel housing a 16th-century icon of the Madonna. On 24 April 1583, it was reported by some townsfolk that the icon was crying blood-tinged tears. This led to an investigation by archbishop, later saint, Carlo Borromeo, who then proposed the erection of a Sanctuary to celebrate the miracle. The first stone for the church was place on 6 March 1584, and the project proceeded under the designs of Pellegrino Tibaldi.

The church, although unfinished, was consecrated in 1586 with the attendance of Archbishop Gaspare Visconti and Cardinal Federico Borromeo. The frescoed icon was now located on the main altar. Construction proceeded over the centuries that followed, but the crossing lacked a dome until the 17th century. On 4 April 1755, a new consecration, dedicating the church to the Queen of the Martyrs was performed in the presence of Cardinal Giuseppe Pozzobonelli. It was around this time was added the dome, designed by Carlo Giuseppe Merlo and the bell-tower, designed by Giulio Galliori.

After the Napoleonic wars ended after 1810, under the patronage of the Marchese Maria Lelia Talenti of Fiorenza (widow of Castelli) and her mother, Maria Selvagina Doria, the neoclassical facade, designed by Leopoldo Pollack, was finally added. The church was reinaugurated in 1895 under Cardinal Andrea Ferrari. A number of chapels have undergone restoration, including that of San Giuseppe (2004) and San Carlo (2007).

The interior however has a rich baroque decoration, sponsored by local nobility, including the Simonetta, Crivelli, Visconti, and Turri. The chapel of San Giuseppe (circa 1603) was frescoed by Camillo Procaccini; the chapel of San Giorgio (1614-1615) by Pier Francesco Mazzucchelli, and the Chapel of San Carlo (1684) by Andrea Lanzani.
