= Sedlec Ossuary =

Chapel in Kutná Hora, Czech Republic

Coordinates: 49°57′43″N 15°17′18″E

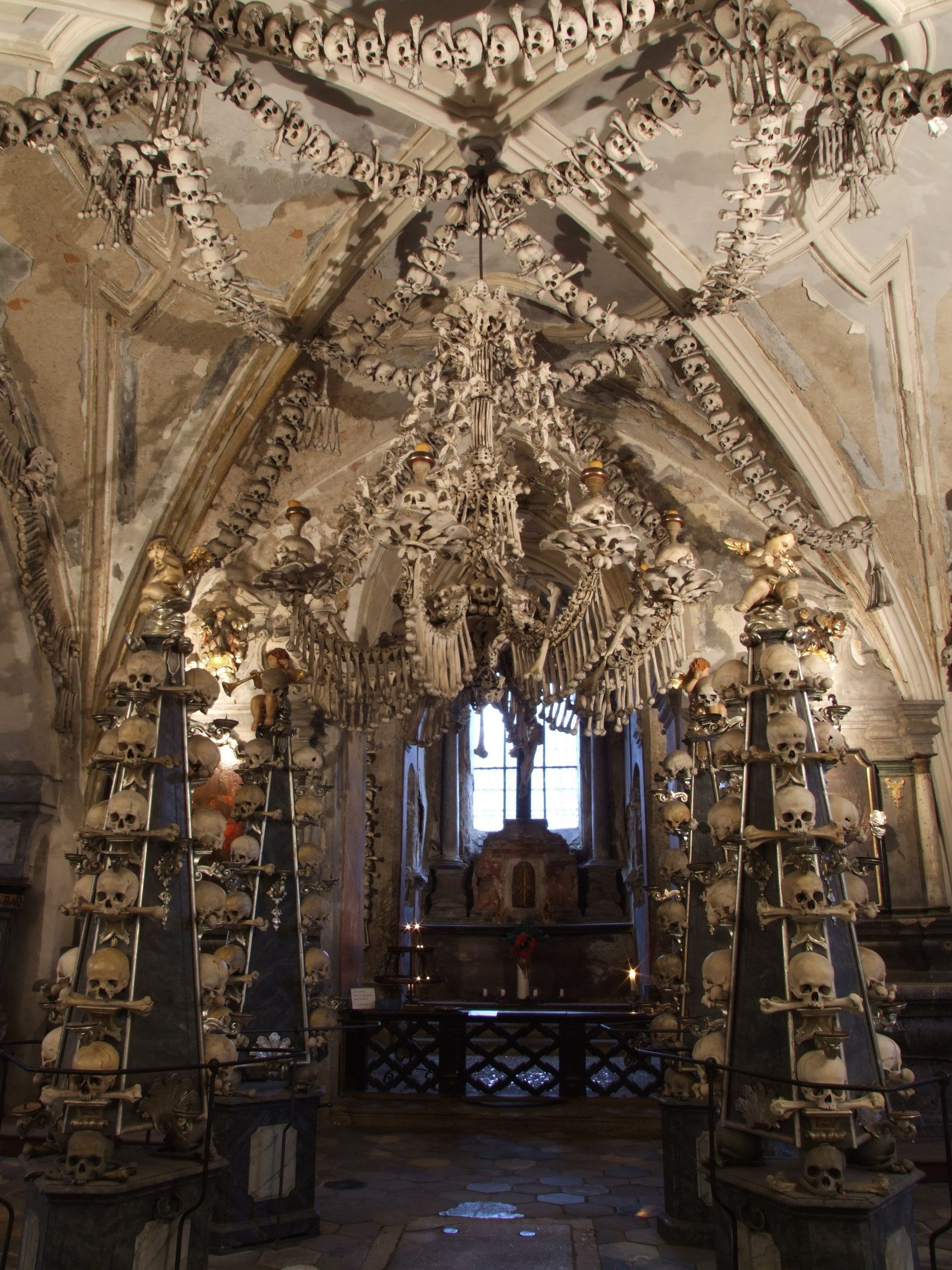
Chapel interior

The Sedlec Ossuary (Czech: Kostnice v Sedlci; German: Sedletz-Beinhaus) is a Roman Catholic chapel, located beneath the Cemetery Church of All Saints (Czech: Hřbitovní kostel Všech Svatých), part of the former Sedlec Abbey in Sedlec, a suburb of Kutná Hora in the Czech Republic. The ossuary is estimated to contain the skeletons of between 40,000 and 70,000 people, whose bones have, in many cases, been artistically arranged to form decorations and furnishings for the chapel. The ossuary is among the most visited tourist attractions of the Czech Republic, drawing over 200,000 visitors annually.

Four bell-shaped mounds occupy the corners of the chapel. A chandelier of bones, which contains at least one of every bone in the human body, hangs from the center of the nave with garlands of skulls draping the vault. Other works include piers and monstrances flanking the altar, a coat of arms of the House of Schwarzenberg, and the signature of František Rint, also executed in bone, on the wall near the entrance.

== History ==
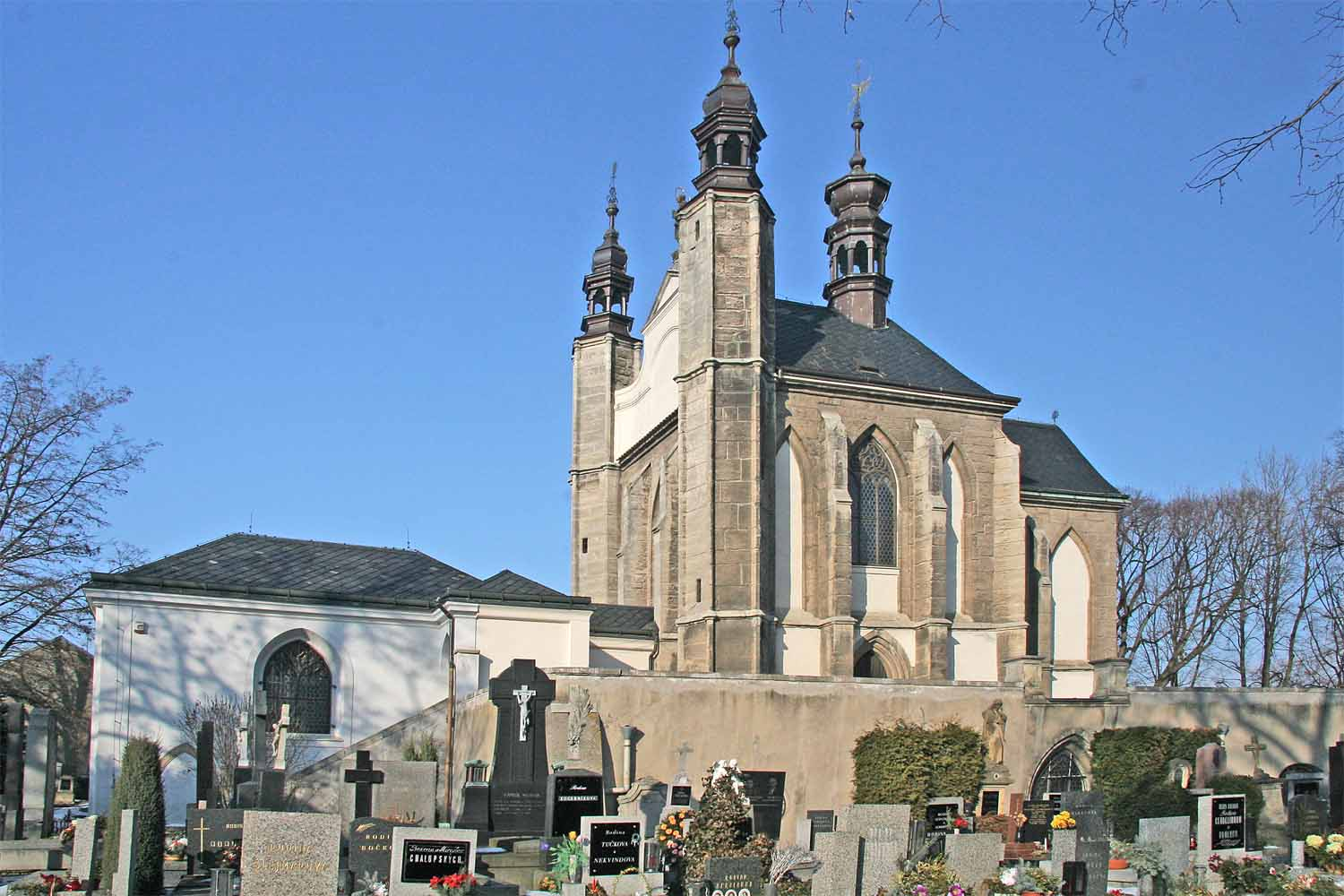
Chapel exterior

In 1278, Henry, the abbot of the Cistercian monastery in Sedlec, was sent to the Holy Land by King Ottokar II of Bohemia. He returned with a small amount of earth he had removed from Golgotha and sprinkled it over the abbey cemetery. The word of this pious act soon spread and the cemetery in Sedlec became a desirable burial site throughout Central Europe.

In the mid 14th century, during the Black Death and after the Hussite Wars in the early 15th century, many thousands were buried in the abbey cemetery, so it had to be greatly enlarged.

Around 1400, a Gothic church was built in the center of the cemetery with a vaulted upper level and a lower chapel to be used as an ossuary for the mass graves unearthed during construction, or simply slated for demolition to make room for new burials.

After 1511, the task of exhuming skeletons and stacking their bones in the chapel was given to a half-blind monk of the order according to a legend.

Between 1703 and 1710, a new entrance was constructed to support the front wall, which was leaning outward, and the upper chapel was rebuilt. This work, in the Czech Baroque style, was designed by Jan Santini Aichel.

In 1870, František Rint, a woodcarver, was employed by the Schwarzenberg family to put the bone heaps into order, yielding a macabre result. The signature of Rint, also executed in bone, appears on the wall near the entrance to the chapel.

== In media ==
In 1970, the 100th anniversary of Rint's contributions, Czech filmmaker Jan Švankmajer was commissioned to document the ossuary. The result was a 10-minute-long frantic-cut film of skeletal images overdubbed with an actual tour-guide's neutral voice narration. This version was initially banned by the Czech Communist authorities for alleged subversion, and the soundtrack was replaced by a brief spoken introduction and a jazz arrangement by Zdeněk Liška of the poem "Comment dessiner le portrait d'un oiseau" ("How to Draw the Portrait of a Bird") by Jacques Prévert. Since the Velvet Revolution, the original tour guide soundtrack has been made available.

In film, the documentary Long Way Round features Ewan McGregor and Charley Boorman stopping to see this church. The ossuary is used as a location for the Dungeons & Dragons movie and the movie Blood & Chocolate. The ossuary influenced Dr. Satan's lair in the Rob Zombie film House of 1000 Corpses. Cara Seymour's character describes it in the final scene of the film Adaptation.

The ossuary has appeared in literature, both fictional and non-fictional. It is a major plot device in the John Connolly novel The Black Angel. In April 2002, German author Jason Dark featured the ossuary in issue 1240 Das Knochenkreuz of his long-running dime novel series Geisterjäger John Sinclair. Spanish artist Vicente Ballestar depicted the chapel's monstrance of bones on the novel's cover. The ossuary was one of the odditites featured in the 2012 edition of Ripley's Believe it or Not. Dan Cruickshank also views the church in his Adventures in Architecture.

The ossuary appeared on two versions of The Amazing Race: The Amazing Race Australia 1 and HaMerotz LaMillion 2.

The bone chandelier was featured on the cover and in the music video for the single "Schwarzer Sarg" by Japanese group Yōsei Teikoku. A photograph of the chapel's interior was also used as the cover art for the 1998 album Nightwork, by Swedish progressive black metal band Diabolical Masquerade.

In the game Kingdom Come: Deliverance II, Henry, the player character, goes to the ossuary and arranges the bones into pyramids. The ossuary is presented as almost empty and in disarray. It also features the blind monk of the legend, whom they called Morticius.

The Sedlec Ossuary

Entrance

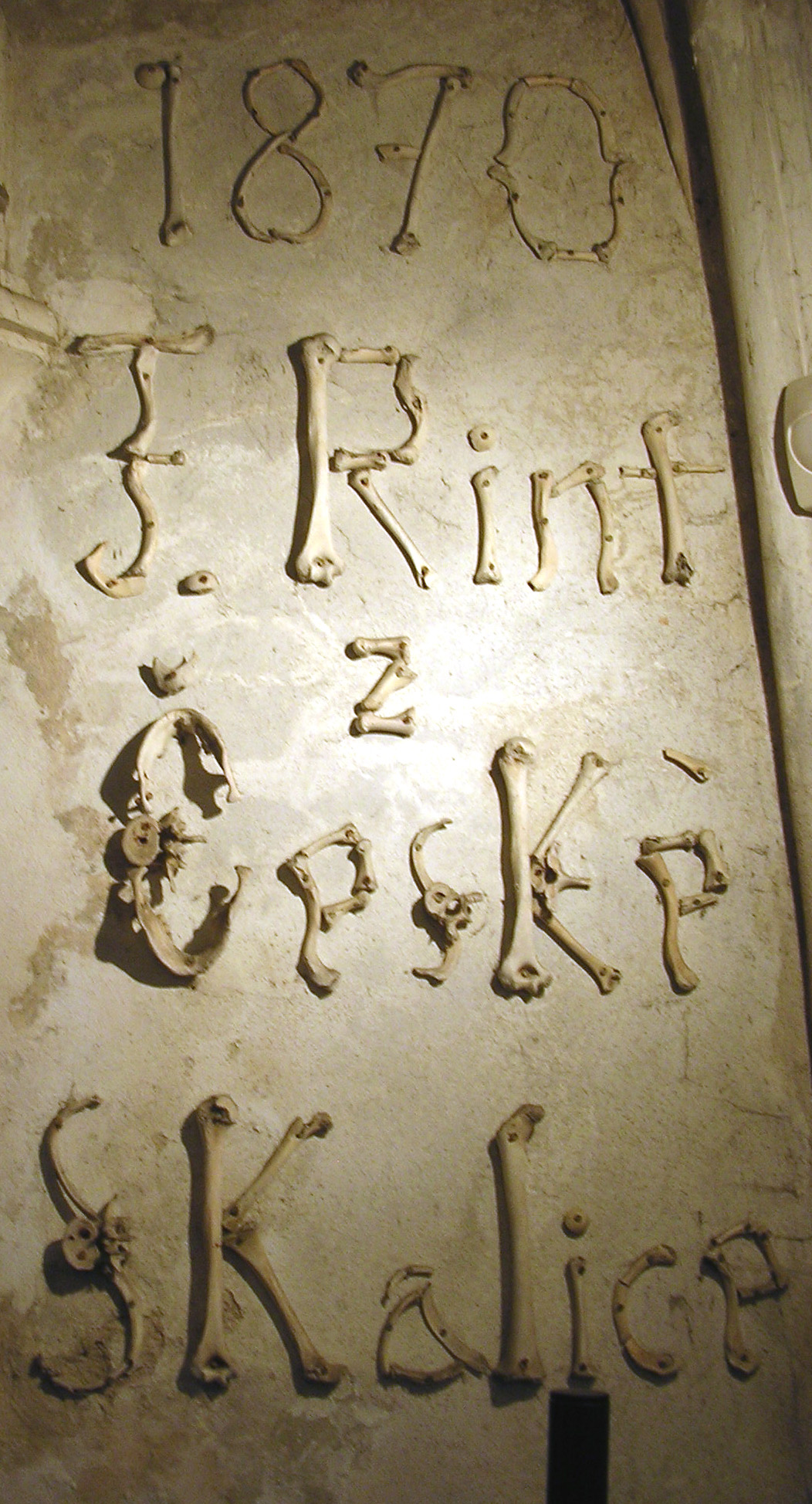
Signature of F. Rint written with bones

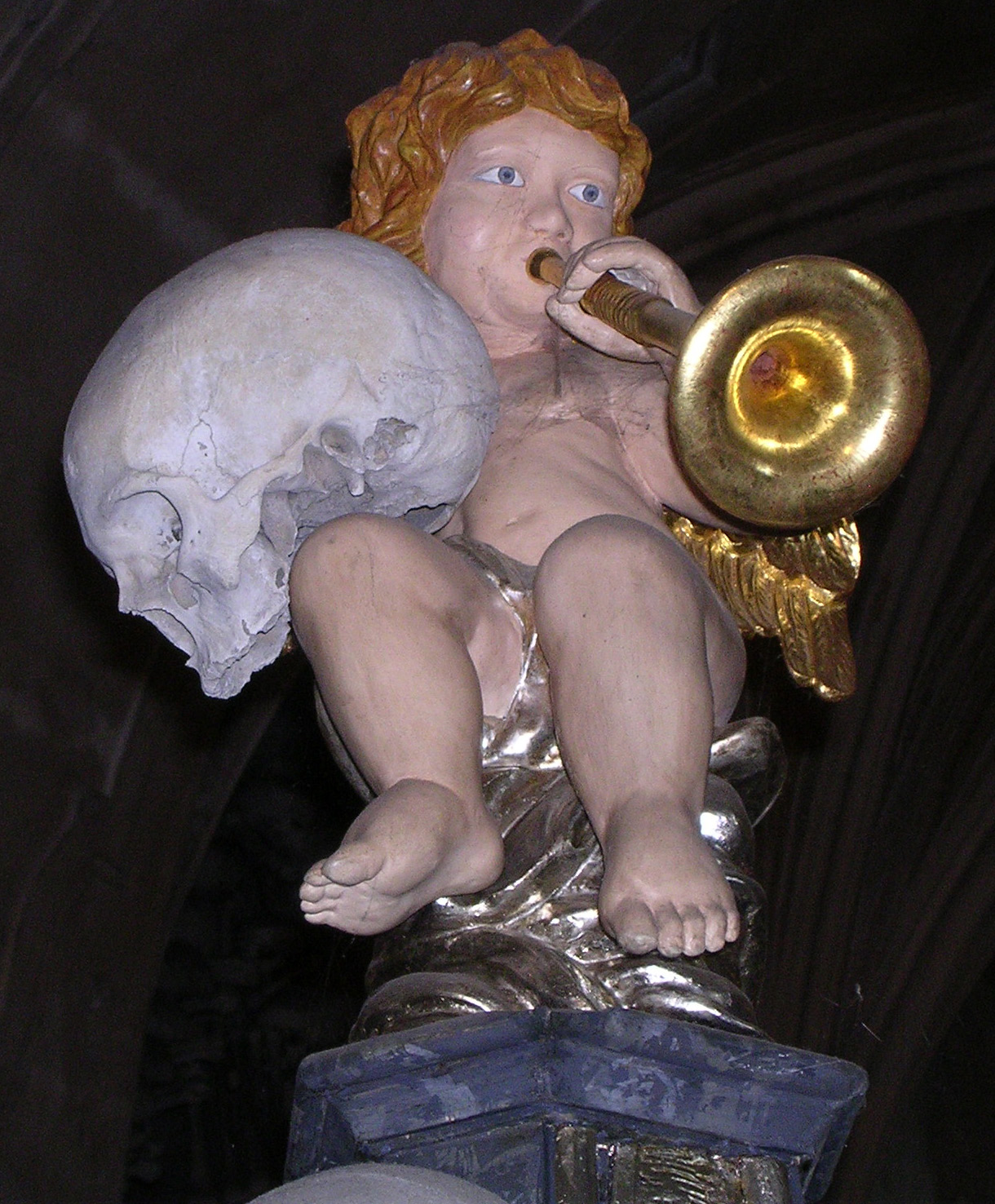
A close-up of a decoration

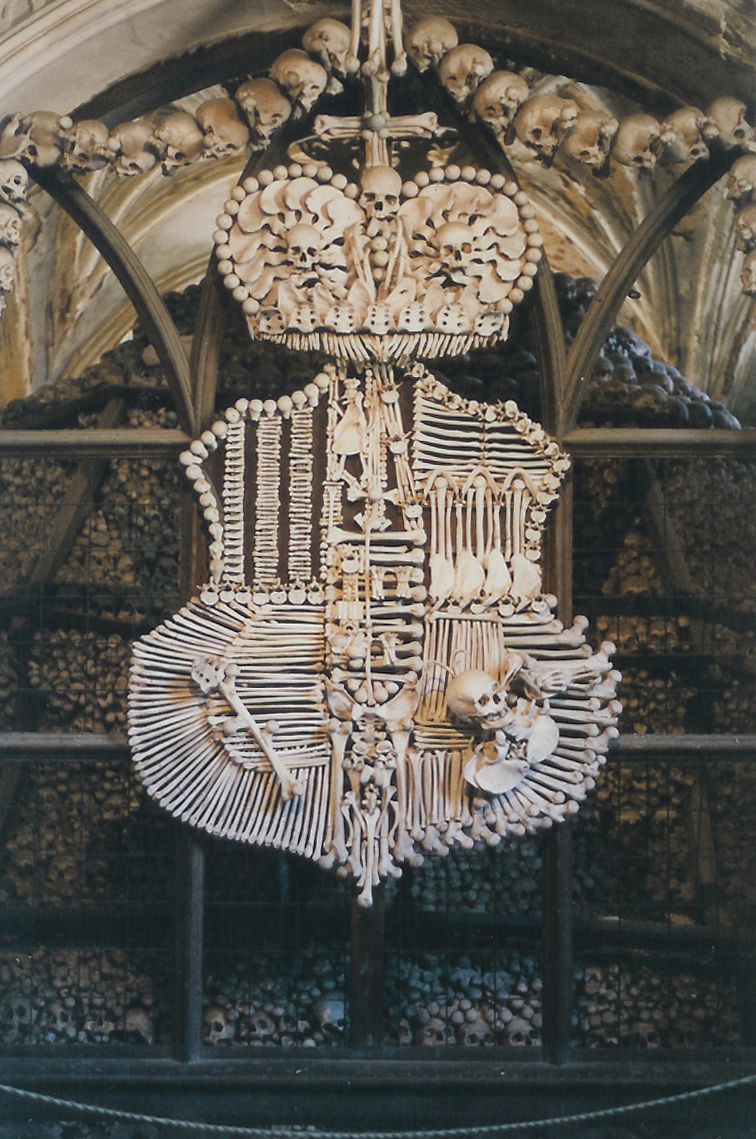
Schwarzenberg coat-of-arms made with bones

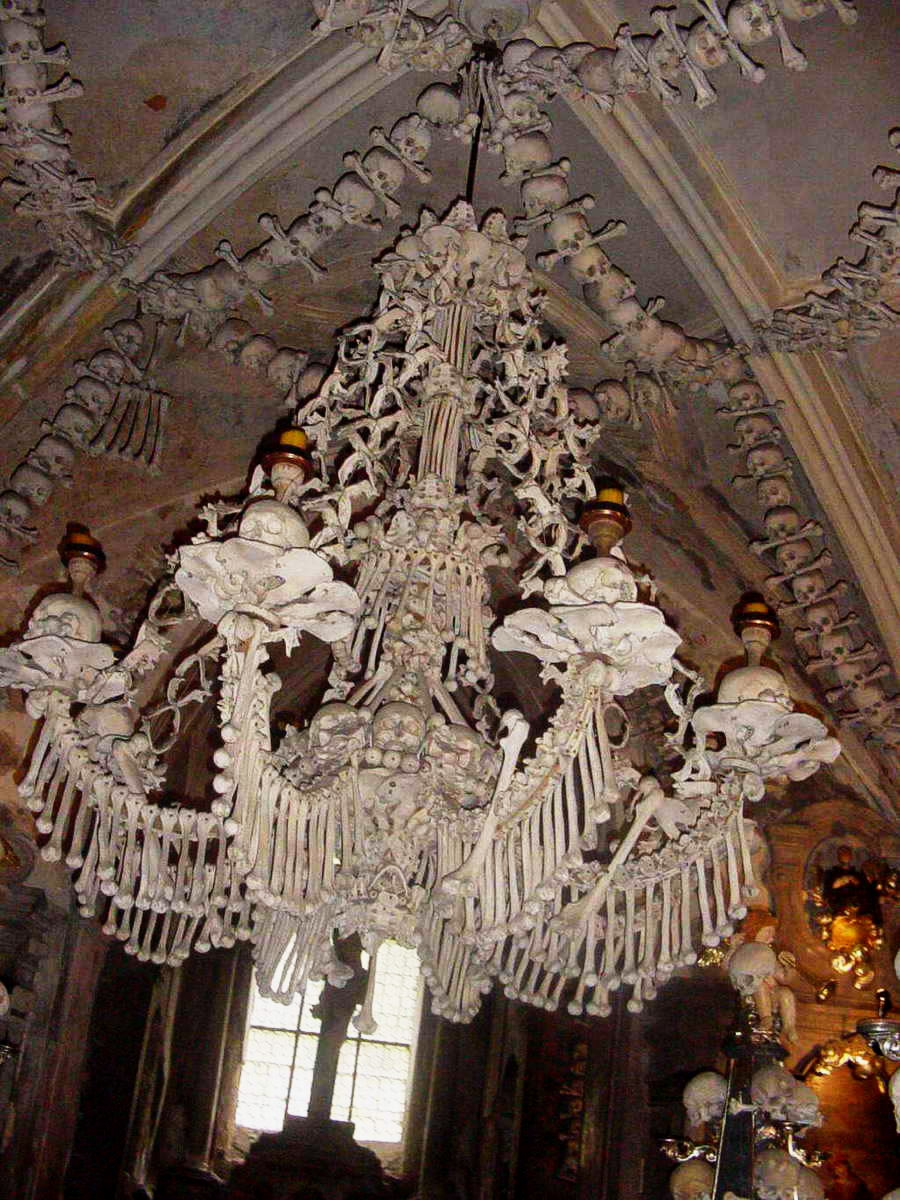
Chandelier made of bones and skulls

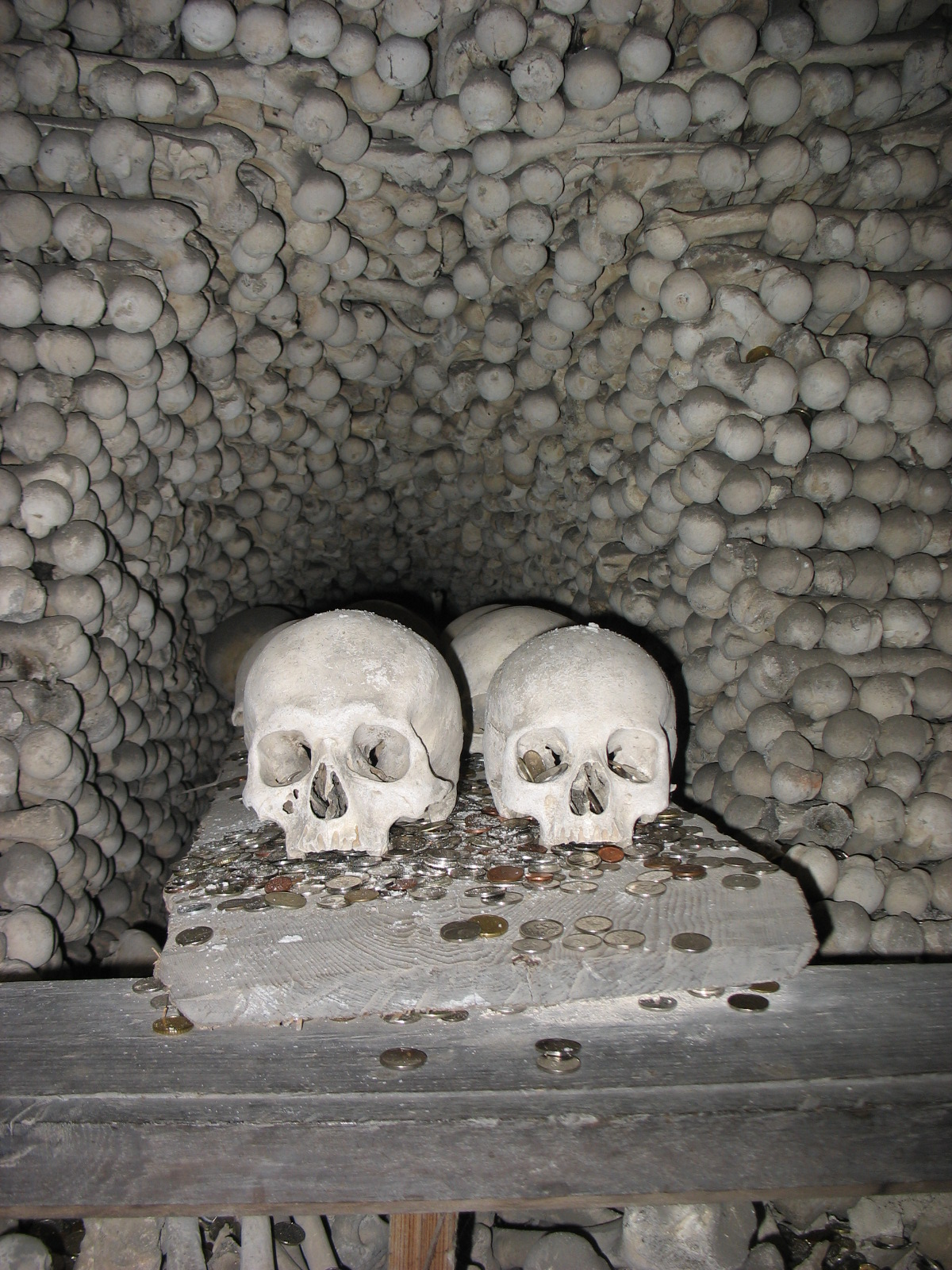
Coins left as offering

== See also ==
- Basilica and Convent of San Francisco
- Capela dos Ossos
- Capuchin Crypt
- San Bernardino alle Ossa
- Skull Chapel
- Skull Tower
- Paris Catacombs
