= Uğurcan Yüce =

German-Turkish artist

Uğurcan Yüce (1947 – February 7, 2015) was a Turkish artist known for his work in Germany, particularly his cover designs for Bastei publishing's comic and novel series, as well as the role-playing game The Dark Eye.

== Early life and education ==
Yüce was born in Stuttgart, Germany, and demonstrated a passion for painting from an early age. At 18, he took on his first professional project, designing a factory wall, which he decorated with mythological frescoes. After completing his schooling, he passed the entrance exams for the Güzel Sanatlar Akademisi ("School of Fine Arts) in Istanbul, now Mimar Sinan Üniversitesi. After studying painting, sculpture, and decoration, he chose to focus on decoration as his main field of study. Two years later, he enrolled in the Department of Stage and Visual Arts, where he received training in literature, history, classical music, costume design, and set decoration. He graduated with a Master's degree in theater decoration with distinction. During his studies (1973–1975), he illustrated the comic novel Aybike for the Turkish daily newspaper Hürriyet.

== Career ==
After completing his military service, Yüce returned to Istanbul and established an office with painter friends, focusing on designing book covers. In 1978, actor and screenwriter Yılmaz Güney commissioned him to create the title poster and opening credits for the internationally acclaimed film The Herd. According to Yüce, he also suggested the film's title, replacing Güney's working title, Berivan ile Şivan ("Berivan and Sivan").

In 1980, Yüce moved to Germany, where he began designing covers for various comic and novel series for Bastei Verlag. Over two decades, he created approximately 2,000 cover designs, including over 1,200 for the series Gespenster Geschichten, as well as works for Tony Ballard, Professor Zamorra, and Damona King. Some of his illustrations were later repurposed for corresponding radio play series, including Geister-Schocker.

Beyond his work for Bastei, Yüce influenced the visual and artistic style of the role-playing game series The Dark Eye. He created numerous cover illustrations for The Dark Eye, for whose visual and artistic appearance he is considered formative. From 1986 onwards, he designed more than 100 illustrations over a decade. His contributions extended to the cover designs of the Nordland Trilogy computer games by Attic and the board games Atlantis and Drachenhort by Schmidt Spiele, as well as Nibelungen by Amigo. He also designed the cover for Attic's The Druid Circle.

In 2012, Yüce collaborated with German computer game developer Silver Style Studios to create artwork for the browser game The Dark Eye: Herokon Online.

Yüce died on February 7, 2015, at the age of 67.
