= Voggenhuber =

Voggenhuber is a surname. Notable people with the surname include:

- Ferenc Voggenhuber (1936–1993), Hungarian football manager
- Johannes Voggenhuber (born 1950), Austrian politician
- Pascal Voggenhuber (born 1980), Swiss non-fiction, thriller author and Copywriter
