= Martha Mackintosh =

English actress (born 1992)

- Born: 1992 (age 33–34); England
- Years active: 2012–present

Martha Mackintosh (born 1992) is an English actress best known for playing Katie Jackson in the Sky1 TV comedy drama series Stella. She is the daughter of actors Steven Mackintosh and Lisa Jacobs.

== Filmography ==
=== Film ===
Year	Title	Role	Notes
2012	Latvia	Georgia	
2013	The Heart Fails Without Warning	Morna	Short
2015	A Song for Jenny	Lizzie	
2016	Brimstone	Pregnant Woman	

=== Television ===
Year	Title	Role	Notes
1992	Waiting for God	Baby Diana	Series 3, Christmas Special
2011	Midsomer Murders	Tamsin Bickford	Series 14, Episode 7
2012	New Tricks	Fawn Brammall	Series 9, Episode 6
2013	What Remains	Peri	3 episodes
2014–16	Stella	Katie Jackson	20 episodes

=== Video games ===
Year	Title	Role	Notes
2014	Game of Thrones	Mira Forrester	
2016	Dark Souls III	Company Captain Yorshka	
2016	Sherlock Holmes: The Devil's Daughter		
2016	Shadow Tactics: Blades of the Shogun	Yuki	
2017	The Pillars of the Earth	Elizabeth / Civilians	
2017	Ruby Rei	Ruby Rei	
2018	Another Sight	Kit	
2022	Elden Ring	Melina	
2023	Arknights	Reed / Reed the Flame Shadow	

=== Audiobooks ===
Year	Title	Role	Notes	Production company
2015	John Sinclair – Demon Hunter	Mother / Waitress / Linda Elkham / Sheila Hopkins	4 episodes	Lübbe Audio
