= John Sinclair (German fiction) =

Protagonist of a German series

- First appearance: Die Nacht des Hexers (July 1973)
- Created by: Jason Dark
- Portrayed by: Florian Fitz (film); Kai Maertens (TV series)
- Voiced by: Frank Glaubrecht; Dietmar Wunder; Andrew Wincott

In-universe information
- Gender: Male
- Occupation: Scotland Yard chief inspector
- Nationality: British

John Sinclair is a fictional character and the protagonist of a popular German horror detective series (of the dime novel or penny dreadful variety). The full title is Geisterjäger John Sinclair, (lit. Ghost Hunter John Sinclair), and the official English title is John Sinclair: Demon Hunter. The long-running series has been ongoing since 1973 and has been released weekly since 1978.

== Premise ==
In the stories, Scotland Yard chief inspector John Sinclair battles all kinds of undead and demonic creatures, such as vampires, witches, ghouls, and werewolves.

== Commercial success ==
While falling into the category of 'pulp fiction', the ongoing series is yet remarkable for the relatively wide range of its vocabulary and the inventiveness of its plots. The novels have been a commercial success in Germany, with over 250 million copies sold as of 2020. A recent milestone was the release of issue 2400 of the regular novel series in July 2024.

== Writers ==
Most John Sinclair stories in the series have been written only by Helmut Rellergerd under the nom-de-plume of Jason Dark. Only a few of the earliest stories have been written by other authors. As of late, creation of new stories is divided among Rellergerd and several new authors, each of them writing separate full episodes; the new writers are attributed for their respective stories. For example, the Oculus duology (2017) was written by Wolfgang Hohlbein, while forensic biologist Mark Benecke was the author of the novel Brandmal. Rellergerd narrates the stories in first person from Sinclair's point of view whenever he is involved. At all other times a neutral narrator style is used. In some stories Sinclair does not appear and one of his friends takes the leading part.

== Shared universe ==
The John Sinclair stories and their spin-offs Sinclair Academy and Dark Land are part of a larger shared universe of Bastei Lübbe novels and had multiple crossover events with several other German horror and fantasy series, such as Tony Ballard, Damona King and Der Hexer von Salem among others. The Professor Zamorra novels take place in an alternate universe within the fictional multiverse and also had numerous crossovers with John Sinclair since the 1976 story Der Fluch aus dem Dschungel.

== Illustrators ==
Over the decades the Spanish painter Vicenç Badalona Ballestar has created numerous paintings and illustrations for the bestselling series. Other artists that contributed to artworks and cover designs for John Sinclair include Sebastià Boada, Tim White, Les Edwards, Luis Royo, Vicente Segrelles, Ron Walotsky, Alan M. Clark, Michael Whelan, Jim Warren etc.

== Adaptations ==
In Germany, the stories have been adapted into multiple successful audio drama series and audiobooks, as well as a television film and a TV series. Additionally, the novels have also spawned a comic series, tabletop role-playing games and the 1998 video game John Sinclair: Evil Attacks. The novel series is being released in English as of April 2021 by J-Novel Club as part of their J-Novel Pulp imprint.

== Characters of the novel series ==
=== Heroes ===
- John Sinclair is of Scottish descent and the reborn soul of both King Solomon and Knight Templar Hector de Valois. He is a direct descendant of Henry I Sinclair, Earl of Orkney. John Sinclair is described as 1.90m tall, blond in his middle thirties. Like most characters he does not age during the course of the series. His home town is Lauder in the Scottish Borders, which is also where his parents used to live until their deaths in 1997. Sinclair is called the Son of the Light and regularly wields a blessed cross as well as a Beretta handgun with silver bullets, although he has acquired and lost various other weapons during the series. He is a bachelor, rarely having a girlfriend during the series after his relationship with Jane Collins ended.
- Suko is Sinclair's colleague as a Scotland Yard inspector. He is a Chinese proficient in martial arts. As an additional weapon, he carries a whip made from the skin of a demon which instantly kills all undead or demonic beings except the strongest. He has no first name, being called just Suko or Inspector Suko.
  Suko was brought up in a Shaolin temple somewhere in China where he learned his martial arts and discipline. Originally the driver of a powerful Chinese patron in London, he joined Sinclair after his patron and the latter's sole daughter were killed by a dragon-worshipping cult.
- Sir James Powell is the superintendent of Scotland Yard's special division for supernatural phenomena, making him the direct superior of Sinclair and Suko. He rarely gets involved directly into the action, mostly giving information and valuable support from his London office. Sir James can arrange a lot of things due to his status in society and his connections. He has complete confidence in his team.
- Glenda Perkins is the office secretary, especially famous for her coffee. During 2006 she was injected with a nano-tech serum enabling her to teleport. At first, she could not control her teleporting ability, but recently she has begun to master it quite well and is even capable of taking one or two persons with her.
- Shao is Suko's longterm girlfriend. She is Japanese and the reincarnation of the Japanese Goddess Amaterasu, also known as the Phantom with the Crossbow.
- Bill Conolly is a close personal friend of Sinclair's. They have studied together and been friends ever since. Bill is a freelance investigative reporter and sometimes gets involved in Sinclair's cases. He married early in the series.
- Sheila Conolly, née Sheila Hopkins, is the wife of Bill Conolly. Her father was a rich industrialist killed by the demon Sakuro.
- Johnny Conolly is the only child of Sheila and Bill Conolly, and John Sinclair's godson. He is the only character to age during the series, growing up into a good-looking young man currently attending the University of London. Johnny Conolly occasionally gets involved in Sinclair's cases, much to the dismay of his mother. He is the main character of the spin-off series Dark Land.
- Jane Collins is a former witch who switched sides during the course of the series. When an agent of Asmodis cut out her heart, she had to have an artificial heart. Collins works as a successful private detective, only occasionally appearing in the series. After the death of Lady Sarah Goodwin, she inherited her Mayfair home and other possessions.
- Lady Sarah Goldwyn, also called the Horror-Grandma, was a collector of horror books and films as well as antiquarian volumes on magic and the supernatural, making her an expert in the field. She took Jane Collins into her Mayfair home, bequeathing it to her when she was killed by the monster vampires of the Black Death.

=== Recurring villains ===
Most bad guys are destroyed by the end of a novel, but some arch-villains come up quite often against Sinclair until he finds a way to get rid of them permanently. Due to the horror nature of most of the creatures, some return even after being destroyed, most notably Vincent van Akkeren who started mortal and had to be killed 3 times by powers of the light before he stayed dead.

- Doctor Tod ("Doctor Death") was the first recurring villain. He committed suicide after a lost battle with John Sinclair. Asmodina and the Spook transferred his soul into the body of Mafia godfather Solo Morasso. In this body, his main objective is to gather recruits for his killer league, an organization consisting of both demons and human criminals since Sinclair would not take human lives, in order to kill him. Sinclair kills him in a later battle.
- Asmodina was the daughter of the devil Asmodis. Her original shape was Apep, the hell snake. However, her preferred appearance was that of a young, beautiful red-headed woman with horns growing out of her forehead. During the series, she commanded Doctor Tod and his killer league. Later, Doctor Tod wanted to be independent and made a deal with the Spook to kill Asmodina. He managed to do so by taking ownership of Sinclair's silver Boomerang and beheaded her in Spook's realm.
- Der Schwarze Tod ("The Black Death") is another major demon and one of John's enemies. He is based on the grim reaper and was originally defeated in the episode "Das letzte Duell". Decades later, he was revived in the book "Die Rückkehr des Schwarzen Tods".
- Der Spuk ("The Spook") is an ancient demon who came into being when the universe was created. He appears in the form of a dark shadow and is the last surviving Great Old One. The "Cube of Doom" is in his possession, a magical artifact that can activate the "Todesnebel", a deadly fog that kills everyone it comes into contact with.
- Will Mallmann: Formerly one of Sinclair's best friends and allies, he was a commissioner in the Bundeskriminalamt, the German Federal Criminal Police Office. During a vampire hunt, however, he was captured by vampires, fatally wounded and forced to drink a distillant from Count Dracula's blood, turning him into both a vampire and Dracula's heir (he bears the official name of "Dracula II"). Will has since plagued his former friend time and again with his scheme to turn the world into a vampire realm. A magical item, the Bloodstone, also makes him immune to any conventional means of destroying vampires. He later uses the "Vampirwelt" as his headquarters, a dimension of terror inhabited by vampires that was created by Lucifer.
- Vincent van Akkeren was a director of horror movies and secretly the leader of the renegade Knights Templar that worship Baphomet. His goal was to become the grand master of all members of the order. He was later transformed into a vampire and eventually killed by the Black Death in the story "Das Versprechen des Schwarzen Tods".
- Belphegor is a powerful archdemon who uses a flame whip as his signature weapon. He is eventually defeated by the Iron Angel with the magical pendulum.
- Assunga is a shadow witch who wears a magical coat that allows her to teleport and jump between places and realities. For many years she was an ally of Dracula II.
- Mandragoro is a plant demon who guards forests and nature.
- Lupina: The Queen of Werewolfs and lover to Fenris, with whom she has a son, Luparo. Her body is that of a wolf, while her head is human looking. She is later poisoned and killed by Mandragoro when she tries to take over the plant demon's forest in Wales.
- Die Horror-Reiter ("The Riders of Horror") appear in the form of four skeleton knights who are the servants of AEBA. They ride on fire-breathing horses and are loosely based on the Four Horsemen of the Apocalypse.
- Saladin was an evil hypnotist and an ally of the Black Death. He later also joined forces with Dracula II.
- Shimada: A demonic ninja who rivals Amaterasu and uses a sword that was forged in hell.
- Fenris is an entity from Norse mythology in the form of an enormous wolf. He is the ruler of werewolfs and the father of Luparo.
- Strigus was the leader of the Strix and had the appearance of a giant monstrous owl. The strix that served him had skeleton heads and were the arch-enemies of vampire emperor Vampiro-del-mar and his army.
- Akim Samaran was a sculptor who used wax and human skeletons to create living puppets. He held a personal grudge against the Sinclair family and was an ally of the Spook. Samaran was killed in the episode "Das Richtschwert der Templer" when he broke into a crypt and tried to steal a legendary executioner's sword that belonged to the Knights Templar.
- Massago: A demon in the form of a dark silhouette who wears a leathery mask. He first appeared in the story "Das Horror-Spielzeug" and was eventually defeated with the silver cross by John Sinclair.

=== Weapons and special items ===
- Sinclair's weapon of choice is his blessed Silver Cross, inscribed with the initials of the four archangels Michael, Raphael, Gabriel and Uriel. This cross is able to take out any but the most powerful of demons. Being fashioned in biblical times by the prophet Ezekiel, it was bequeathed to John Sinclair by divine powers, making him the "Son of Light".
  The Cross violently attacks any evil force it comes into contact with while protecting any good creature. It is a very powerful artifact whose powers are not yet completely understood by Sinclair. He can further activate the cross with the spell 'Terra pestem teneto, salus hic maneto' turning it into an even more powerful area effect weapon.
- Several characters, mostly Sinclair, Suko, Bill Conolly and Jane Collins, carry a Beretta pistol armed with silver bullets. These bullets are blessed by a Catholic abbot and can vanquish most weaker undead or demonic creatures on impact. Against vampires, air-powered pistols firing wooden darts are also used.
- Suko's demon-hide whip is made from the skin of a defeated demon. It is more powerful than the silver bullets but less than the silver cross. Suko is an expert at wielding the whip and can take out most creatures with one hit.
- The Knochensessel ("Chair of Bones") is a magical chair made from the remains of Jacques de Molay, the last grand master of the Knights Templar. Molay's spirit lives on within the chair, allowing its owner to travel back in time and teleport to different dimensions or mythical places like Avalon. It is currently stored at a monastery in Alet-les-Bains.

=== Religion ===
Rellergerd never states exactly which Christian denomination John Sinclair or any of his team is a member of. The silver bullets are made by a Catholic abbot, even though most of the team probably belong to a Protestant variant of Christianity. Suko and Shao are Buddhists.

== Cultural influence and reception ==
As of 2020, the John Sinclair series sold over 250 million novel copies and over 5 million audio drama units. In Germany, John Sinclair is considered a pop culture and horror icon that has sometimes been compared to Italian comic book hero Dylan Dog. Over the years, there have been numerous fan conventions, with one of the most recent ones being a special event in Cologne on July 15, 2023, that commemorated the 50th anniversary of John Sinclair's first appearance in the 1973 story Die Nacht des Hexers.

There has also been some scholarly engagement with the Sinclair novels of Jason Dark, particularly as regards their author's powers of imagination and inventiveness, and a positive assessment has on occasion been expressed. Tony Page comments:

"Jason Dark’s imaginative powers have rightly been praised. Indeed, Godden writes: ‘As regards imagination, Jason Dark towers houses high in superiority above Sherlock Holmes creator, Conan Doyle.’ (Godden, 207: 293). This is eminent praise indeed - and is justly bestowed. The sheer inexhaustible inventiveness which Dark displays week upon week, in novel after novel, is testimony to a fertility of imagination which can rightly lay claim to lie within the realm of genius."

== German audio productions ==
=== Audio drama series ===
The first audio drama series based on John Sinclair consisted of 107 episodes and was produced by Tonstudio Braun, a company based in Wiesbaden, Germany. It was originally distributed on cassette tape from 1981 to 1991, although a remastered version of the old recordings was later released on CD from 2015 to 2021.

In 1999, Lübbe Audio began producing a new audio drama series, which is known as Geisterjäger John Sinclair – Edition 2000. The first episode, Im Nachtclub der Vampire, was released on CD in October 2000 and series creator Helmut Rellergerd eventually received a gold record in 2013 to celebrate 150,000 sold units. In 2016, Rellergerd was presented with a double platinum record to commemorate 400,000 sold units of episode 77. The role of John Sinclair is currently voiced by Dietmar Wunder, who is best known for dubbing Daniel Craig in the German version of the James Bond films. Episode 170 of the ongoing series was released in April 2024, titled Ein Grab aus der Vergangenheit. There have also been several special editions, including crossovers with Dorian Hunter and Wolfgang Hohlbein's Der Hexer franchise. Over the decades, numerous well-known actors made guest or cameo appearances on the John Sinclair audio drama series, including Carmen-Maja Antoni, Wolfgang Bahro, Hartmut Becker, Rasmus Borowski, Ralph Caspers, Peter Groeger, Peter Matić, Jürgen Prochnow, Oliver Rohrbeck and Martin Semmelrogge.

From 2010 to 2023, Lübbe also released the audio drama series John Sinclair Classics, a prequel set before the events of the main series.

Additionally, Lübbe produced the reboot audio drama SINCLAIR (2019–2022), which takes place in an alternate universe. Torben Liebrecht voiced John Sinclair in the limited reboot series.

=== Audiobook series ===
From 2011 to 2012, Lübbe produced an audiobook series based on the novels that was narrated by Carsten Wilhelm. The series consists of 50 episodes.

There has also been the short-lived audiobook series Sinclair Academy (2016–2017). The spin-off serves as a chronological epilogue to the main series, taking place decades into the future and depicting an elderly John Sinclair.

Another spin-off is the audiobook series Die Suko-Akten, in which Martin May reprises his role as Suko from the regular audio drama.

Lübbe also started releasing Promis lesen Sinclair in 2023, an audiobook series that features German celebrities such as Oliver Kalkofe and Urban Priol reading their favourite John Sinclair stories.

== Live-action version ==
In April 1997, the live-action television film John Sinclair: Brides of the Devil based on the novels premiered on the channel RTL. The film was co-produced by John de Mol Jr., written by Christoph Gottwald and directed by Klaus Knoesel. It starred Florian Fitz as John Sinclair.

The novels were later also adapted into the television series Geisterjäger John Sinclair that premiered on RTL in January 2000. The role of John Sinclair was recast with Kai Maertens for the series. It consists of nine episodes that were directed by Robert Sigl, John van de Rest, Daniel Anderson and Bernd Fiedler. The series received generally negative reviews from critics, fans of the novel series and author Helmut Rellergerd himself.

== Translations ==
In addition, the John Sinclair novel series has also been translated into various other languages, with some of the stories being published more than once in some European countries. Translated versions of the stories were published in Belgium, England, Finland, France, the Netherlands and the Czech Republic. A new English translation is available from J-Novel Club featuring never-before translated stories.

== 2015 English version ==
In 2015, Bastei Lübbe released the first issue of John Sinclair – Demon Hunter, an English reboot of the Sinclair series that retells the story from the beginning. It is only loosely based on the original stories by Helmut Rellergerd. This e-book series was written by Gabriel Conroy and ended after 12 issues.

John Sinclair – Demon Hunter was also adapted into an English audio drama series, which was recorded at OMUK Studios, London and Igloo Music, Los Angeles.

=== Main cast ===
- Anthony Skordi as Narrator
- Andrew Wincott as John Sinclair
- David Rintoul as Sir James Powell
- Carl Prekopp as Bill Connolly

12 episodes of the John Sinclair – Demon Hunter audiobook series were released between 2015 and 2019:

=== Curse of the Undead ===
- Directed by Douglas Welbat
- Original release: 27 March 2015

Additional cast

- Toby Longworth as Dr Ivan Orgoff
- Jess Robinson as Anne Baxter
- Terry Wilton as Constable Jones
- Robbie MacNabb as Paddy
- Peter Marinker as Kinny Mitchell
- Emma Tate as Dr McAlister
- Dan Mersh as Ronald Winston
- Charlotte Moore as Caroline Winston
- Nico Lennon as Captain Green
- Ben Whitehead as Jim Burns
- Daniel Kendrick as Bill Mackenzie
- Louis Suc as Billy
- Martha Mackintosh as Mother
- Nicolette McKenzie as Radio Voice

=== The Lord of Death ===
- Directed by Douglas Welbat
- Original release: 12 June 2015

Additional cast

- Peter Marinker as Dr Sawyer
- Tim Bentinck as High Priest
- Bill Roberts as Ramon Menendez
- Eric Meyers as Chester Davis
- Laurence Bouvard as Yolanda Garcia
- Toby Longworth as El Gorán
- Nicolette McKenzie as Viola Wayne
- Daniel Kendrick as Private Shelton
- Nico Lennon as Jack Bancroft

=== Dr. Satanos ===
- Directed by Douglas Welbat
- Original release: 31 July 2015

Additional cast

- Gareth Armstrong as Dr Satanos
- Tim Bentinck as Barney Browne
- Nicolette McKenzie as Marianne Browne
- Alix Wilton Regan as June Galloway
- Ben Whitehead as Harold Galloway
- Bill Roberts and Eric Meyers as Animal Rights Activists
- Charlotte Moore as Edwina Jackson
- Nico Lennon as Wilkins
- Martha Mackintosh as Waitress

=== A Feast of Blood ===
- Directed by Douglas Welbat
- Original release: 25 September 2015

Additional cast

- Ashley Margolis as Francis Carrigan
- Martha Mackintosh as Linda Elkham
- Laurence Bouvard as Lady L
- Bill Roberts as Istvan Laduga
- David Shaw Parker as Officer Sanford
- Adam Longworth as Robert Elkham
- Rachel Atkins as Abigail Cunningham
- Robbie MacNabb as Earl of Carrigan
- Gareth Armstrong as Dr Grayson
- Terry Wilton as Horace Sinclair
- Tim Bentinck as Walter
- Alix Wilton Regan as Mandy
- Charlotte Moore as Teacher
- Daniel Kendrick as Marquis

=== Dark Pharaoh ===
- Directed by Douglas Welbat
- Original release: 11 December 2015

Additional cast

- Martha Mackintosh as Sheila Hopkins
- Ben Whitehead as Kenneth Hopkins
- Terry Wilton as Sir Gerald Hopkins
- Toby Longworth as Dr Qureshi
- Nico Lennon as Wendell Carson
- Kerry Shale as Sakuro
- Carolanne Lyme as Farrah
- Nicolette McKenzie as Mrs Chopra
- Adam Longworth as Xotorez
- Glen McCready as Ellery

=== The Vampire Graveyard ===
- Directed by Douglas Welbat
- Original release: 26 February 2016

Additional cast

- Peter Marinker as Dr Sawyer
- Dan Mersh as Winnie
- Alix Wilton Regan as Emily
- Daniel Kendrick as Billygoat
- Kerry Shale as Jeremiah Worthington
- Glen McCready as Dr Adam Boscombe
- Rachel Atkins as Dr Charlotte Manning
- Ben Whitehead as Dr Patel
- Nico Lennon as Constable Jim Clarke
- Nicolette McKenzie as Simona Grace
- Carolanne Lyme as Mrs Bliss
- Bill Roberts as Wilbur Abernathy
- Charlotte Moore as Mrs Sinclair
- Terry Wilton as Horace Sinclair
- Emma Tate as Mary
- Toby Longworth as Whalen
- Tim Bentinck as Fred
- Adam Longworth as Harold Godfrey

=== A Long Day in Hell ===
- Directed by Douglas Welbat
- Original release: 10 November 2017

Additional cast

- Jess Robinson as Glenda Perkins
- Neil Dudgeon as Dr Ralph Barlow
- Clare Louise Connolly as Laura Cody
- Max Furst as Jimmy Cody
- Steve Furst as Viktor Benedict
- Suzanne Cave as Olivia Benedict
- Nicolette McKenzie as Agnes
- Alexandra Dowling as Elizabeth Bathory
- Neil McCaul as Father Graham
- Colleen Prendergast as Maggie
- Matt Littler as Joe Hastings
- Ashley Margolis as Ed Wilbur
- Harriet Kershaw as EMT
- Rob Rackstraw as Policeman
- Liane-Rose Bunce and Milenna Rose Binks as Nurses
- Dan Mersh, Eric Meyers and Glen McCready as Guards
- Harriet Carmichael, Alec Guelff and Alix Wilton Regan as Women

=== The Taste of Human Flesh ===
- Directed by Douglas Welbat
- Original release: 2 May 2019

=== To Kill A Beast ===
- Directed by Douglas Welbat
- Original release: 2 May 2019

=== Black Dragon Rising ===
- Directed by Douglas Welbat
- Original release: 2 May 2019

=== Rage of the Black Dragon ===
- Directed by Douglas Welbat
- Original release: 2 May 2019

=== Some Darker Magic ===
- Directed by Douglas Welbat
- Original release: 2 May 2019

== 2021 English Version ==
In April 2021, light novel and manga publisher J-Novel Club announced John Sinclair: Demon Hunter as one of three launch titles for its J-Novel Pulp imprint, dedicated to the best of European pulp fiction. Nine volumes, each containing four installments, or "episodes", have been announced. The cover art for this release is by NAMCOOo, artist for the light novel series Outer Ragna.

Volumes 1-3 of J-Novel Club's release feature a reworked version of the 2015 Gabriel Conroy stories. Changes include realigning the stories to their original 1970's time period and reverting alterations to some characters in order to more smoothly transition into Jason Dark's original stories, starting with Volume 4. The J-Novel Club release also sees Conroy's text adapted into British English as the novels were originally written with American spelling and phraseology.

Beginning with Volume 4, the J-Novel Pulp release contains direct, unaltered translations from a selection of Jason Dark's original stories as chosen by the Geisterjäger John Sinclair editors.

In line with J-Novel Club's light novel releases, new installments are first serialized on J-Novel Club's website over a number of weeks for subscribers. The first part of each volume is free for all visitors and requires no membership or subscription to read. Following web serialization, each volume is released as an Ebook at all major digital book retailers. J-Novel Club members who purchase the books directly receive textless versions of the cover art as a bonus.

=== List of J-Novel Club Volumes ===
No.	Author	Original Episode No.	German Release	J-Novel Club Release
1	Gabriel Conroy	1-4 (2015 Edition)	2015	May 2021 ISBN 978-1-7183-5120-2
1977 is a strange year. Things beyond human understanding have begun to surface, threatening the peace and leaving behind an endless trail of blood. When such incidents arise, it is down to Scotland Yard's Special Division and their Demon Hunter in residence, John Sinclair, to set things right. But Sinclair is haunted by demons of his own, ones which rival the dark forces attacking innocents around him. Can he conquer one to vanquish the other?
2	Gabriel Conroy	5-8 (2015 Edition)	2015/2017	June 2021 ISBN 978-1-7183-5122-6
John Sinclair's life is many things, but boring is not one of them. When an archaeological expedition ends in a series of questionable deaths, Sinclair's old friend Bill Conolly begins to investigate. If one set of deadly digs wasn't enough, an expedition in Yorkshire unearths a vampire graveyard with bloody consequences – including for Sinclair himself. Will he survive his own death and undeath, or wind up as part of a ghoulish banquet alongside the dregs of London?
3	Gabriel Conroy	9-12 (2015 Edition)	2017/2018	July 2021 ISBN 978-1-7183-5124-0
In John Sinclair's line of work, the lines are blurred between supernatural cults and organised crime: both lead to extensive violence and upset the peace. When the two combine into a force threatening to upheave London's underworld, Sinclair has to team up with a new partner to prevent the Black Dragon from rising in more ways than one. The aftermath brings equally little peace, as Sinclair's new fling finds herself targeted by dark forces as well. Can he save her without betraying all he holds dear?
4	Jason Dark	1, 7, 14, 16	1978	October 2021 ISBN 978-1-7183-5126-4
It doesn't take long in the demon hunting business to realise that not everything is as it seems. When a madman is found wandering the woods in Spessart, John Sinclair finds himself at a fairy-tale castle promising its patrons a night they'll never forget. Little does he know, something far more sinister lurks behind closed doors. An unholy plan to unleash the horrors of a long-lost continent leads Sinclair to team up with his partner Suko, but time is of the essence. Can the infamous Demon Hunter take on the unstoppable force that is the Black Death, or will he lose his head along the way? Original German Stories: Im Nachtclub der Vampire (The Vampires' Nightclub) Das Horror-Schloß im Spessart (Spessart's Castle of Horrors) Der schwarze Henker (The Dark Headsman) Das Mädchen von Atlantis (The Girl from Atlantis)
5	Jason Dark	17, 18, 19, 33	1978/1979	December 2021 ISBN 978-1-7183-5128-8
Demon hunting might be dangerous work, but it comes with travel benefits! John Sinclair and Suko travel to Greece in pursuit of a mysterious magician and the secrets of Atlantis! But even the Mediterranean depths are full of threats... Bound by a promise, the gang return to Britain to slay a vampire coven, before taking flight for New York! But with the meter running on a cursed taxi, will Sinclair make it to Romania in time to prevent Dracula's descendants from rising again - or will a certain Impaler beat him to it? Original German Stories: Das Dämonenauge (The Demon's Eye) Die Hexenmühle (The Witches' Mill) Das Horror-Taxi von New York (The Horror Taxi from New York) Der Pfähler (The Impaler)
6	Jason Dark	34, 35, 38, 42	1979	April 2022 ISBN 978-1-7183-5130-1
The work of a demon hunter is never done! While John Sinclair's still in Romania, hot on D Kalurac's trail, a band of vampires cause trouble in London. Not only do their spawn infiltrate a British ministry, the vampires even kidnap Bill Connolly's wife and son! John Sinclair has to pull out all the stops to put an end to D Kalurac's plans! But evil is never without company, and John also has to travel to a French monastery to decipher the mystery behind "aeba". Just what could it mean? The final story in this volume sees John head to Wales, where he has to prevent the nachzehrers from rising...and do battle with a familiar face. Original German Stories: Dracula gibt sich die Ehre (Dracula Cordially Invites) Die Vampirfalle (The Vampire Trap) Die Horror-Reiter (The Skull Crew) Der Totenbeschwürer (The Necromancer)
7	Jason Dark	50, 51, 55, 61	1979	2022
Original German Stories: Der Gelbe Satan (The Golden Satan) Horror-Kreuzfahrt (The Cruise from Hell) Todeszone London (Death Zone London) Kino des Schreckens (The Cinema of Terror)
8	Jason Dark	64, 65, 71, 81	1979-1980	2022
Original German Stories: Der Hexer von Paris Gefangen in der Mikrowelt Knochensaat Der Sensenmann als Hochzeitsgast
9	Jason Dark	84, 100, 101, 102	1980	2022
Original German Stories: Das Buch der grausamen Träume Die Drohung Ein Friedhof am Ende der Welt Das letzte Duell
