= Kostnice =

Kostnice

- Kostnice is an alternate name for Konstanz, a university town in south-west Germany.
- Kostnice Sedlec is an ossuary chapel in the Czech Republic.
