= Dungeons & Dragons (2000 film) =

2000 fantasy film directed by Courtney Solomon

- Theatrical release poster
- Directed by: Courtney Solomon
- Written by: Carroll Cartwright; Topper Lilien
- Based on: Dungeons & Dragons by Wizards of the Coast
- Produced by: Thomas M. Hammel; Kia Jam; Courtney Solomon
- Starring: Justin Whalin; Marlon Wayans; Thora Birch; Zoe McLellan; Kristen Wilson; Lee Arenberg; Bruce Payne; Jeremy Irons
- Cinematography: Douglas Milsome
- Edited by: Caroline Ross
- Music by: Justin Caine Burnett
- Production companies: Behavior Worldwide; Silver Pictures; Sweetpea Entertainment
- Distributed by: New Line Cinema (United States); J&M Entertainment (International)
- Release date: December 8, 2000
- Running time: 108 minutes
- Countries: United States; Czech Republic
- Language: English
- Budget: $45 million
- Box office: $33.8 million

Dungeons & Dragons is a 2000 fantasy-adventure film directed by Courtney Solomon (in his feature directorial debut), and written by Carroll Cartwright and Topper Lilien. Based on the role-playing game of the same name, the plot follows an empress who wishes to get hold of a mythical rod that will help her fight an evil wizard, and enlists two thieves for help. The film stars Justin Whalin, Marlon Wayans, Thora Birch, Zoe McLellan, Kristen Wilson, Lee Arenberg, Bruce Payne and Jeremy Irons.

Filming took place on location at Sedlec Ossuary. Despite being a box office bomb, and a critical failure, a made-for-TV sequel, Wrath of the Dragon God, was released in 2005. It was not a direct continuation of the storyline of the previous film, though Bruce Payne's character, Damodar, makes a return. A third film, The Book of Vile Darkness, was shot in 2011 and released direct-to-DVD in the United Kingdom on August 9, 2012.

== Plot ==
Izmir's young Empress, Savina, rules with the power of a scepter that allows her to control gold dragons. When she wants to give rights to the common people, she's opposed by the Council of Mages, led by the evil Profion. They demand that she hand over the scepter. She refuses and, anticipating a conflict, both sides try to get their hands on the legendary Rod of Savrille, which would let them control red dragons.

Teenage thieves Ridley and Snails try to rob the Sumdall magic school. They're caught by a young apprentice named Marina, just as Profion's assistant Damodar attacks the library wizard to get his map to the Rod of Savrille. Marina, Ridley, and Snails manage to escape with the map, and join with a dwarf named Elwood.

They discover that to enter the tomb containing the Rod, they need a ruby key called the "Eye of the Dragon." Ridley finds it in a deadly maze in the thieves' guild in Antius, but Damodar arrives and captures Marina and the map before they can flee. The rest of the group escape, only to be captured by the elf Norda, a paladin who is working for the Empress. Realizing they are fighting for the same cause, they free Marina and get the map back, although Snails dies in the attempt.

They get the Rod of Savrille, although Damodar takes it from them and gives it to Profion. He and the other mages fight against the Empress, with dragons on both sides, until Ridley kills Damodar, and gets the Rod of Savrille back from Profion. Marina encourages Ridley to use the Rod to bring Profion down, but Ridley, realizing the Rod's power will corrupt him, refuses and destroys it. Then the Empress has a gold dragon kill Profion.

Ridley later visits the grave of Snails with Marina, Elwood, and Norda. When he places the Eye of the Dragon on the grave, the ruby starts to glow and Snails' name disappears. Norda tells Ridley to not question his gift and that "his friend awaits him", and the ruby transports the group somewhere else.

== Cast ==
- Justin Whalin as Ridley Freeborn, a rogue/thief
- Marlon Wayans as Snails, a rogue/thief
- Zoe McLellan as Marina Pretensa, a young mage
- Lee Arenberg as Elwood, a dwarf fighter
- Kristen Wilson as Norda, an elven ranger
- Jeremy Irons as Mage Profion
- Bruce Payne as Damodar
- Thora Birch as Empress Savina
- Edward Jewesbury as Vildan Vildir
- Richard O'Brien as Xilus, leader of a thieves guild
- Tom Baker as Halvarth the Elf
- Robert Miano as Azmath
- Tomas Havrlik and Stanislav Ondricek as Mages
- Martin Astles and Matthew O'Toole as Orcs
- David O'Kelly as Three Eyes
- Kia Jam, Nicolas Rochette, and David Mandis as thieves
- Robert Henny as Crimson Brigade
- Roman Hemala as Council Mage
- Andrew Blau and Marta Urbanová as elves
- Jirí Machácek as Loyalist General

Dave Arneson, the co-creator of the Dungeons & Dragons role-playing game, makes a cameo appearance in deleted scenes.

== Development ==
=== Background ===
The earliest attempt at a feature-length adaptation of a Dungeons & Dragons property by the major film industry date to the early 1980s, as there was a strong interest in producing a film based on Advanced Dungeons & Dragons; Gary Gygax had several discussions with producers and agents about the idea, and a screenplay by James Goldman received eyeballs from major studios. However, nothing came about this due to conflicts between TSR and the studios. Dungeons & Dragons player Courtney Solomon, who had personal experience with the entertainment industry as a child because his mother was a production coordinator on television series filmed in Toronto, wanted to produce a film based on the game since 1990.

=== Negotiations and funding ===
==== 1990–1997: TSR and studio deals ====
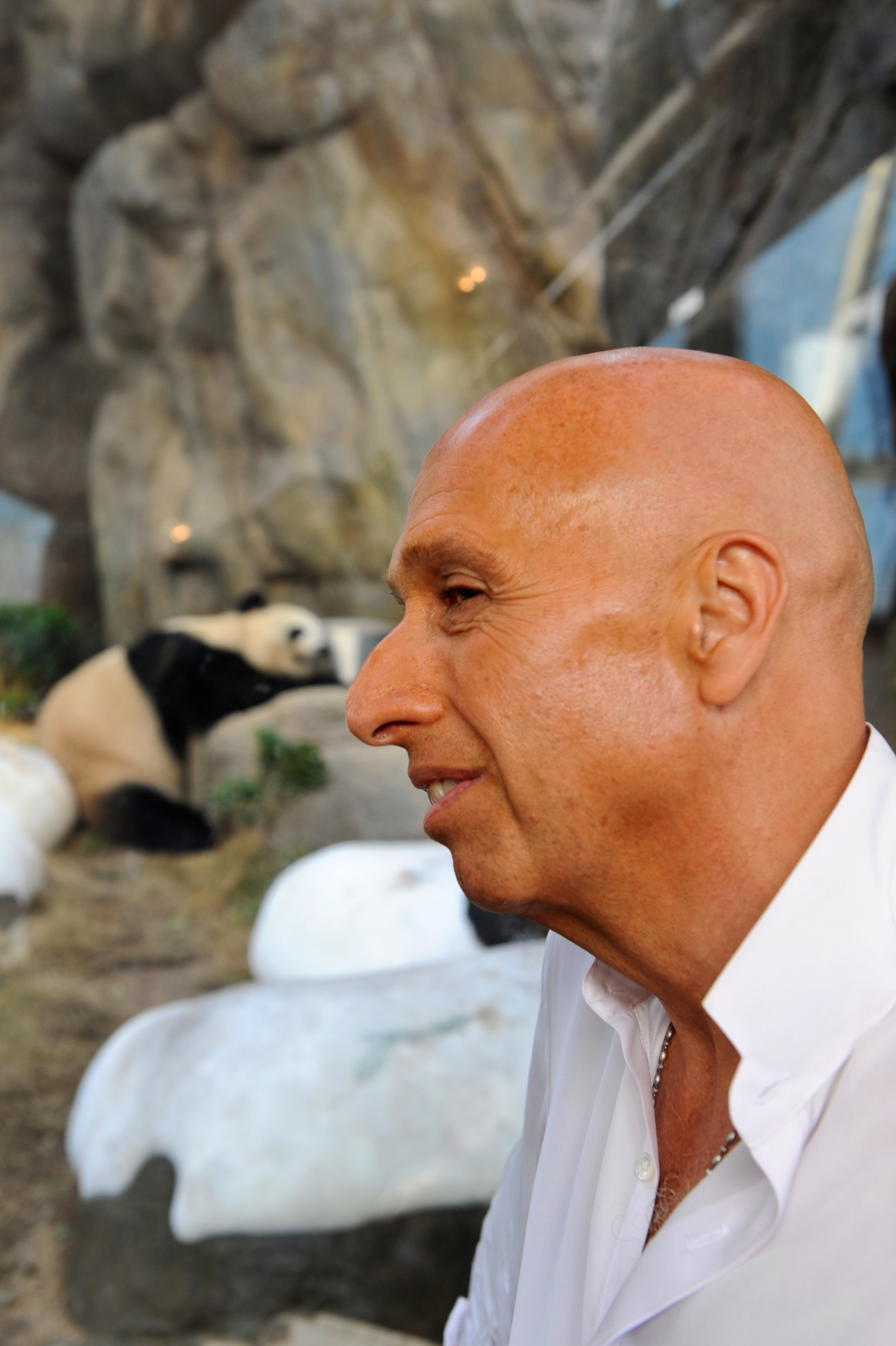
Courtney Solomon received help from Hong Kong entrepreneur Allan Zeman to fund Dungeons & Dragons.

In 1990, Solomon contacted staff from Dungeons & Dragons's publisher, TSR, Inc., under the guise of working on a school economics project; they informed him about studios in the past failing to produce a film based on the game, due to having too little of an understanding of the RPG's X-factor. It took him 18 months to convince TSR to set up negotiations, but TSR finally agreed to it, because of his upfront royalty, being better than other studios the company worked with, according to vice president Ryan Dancey. Solomon obtained an option from TSR after writing a 30-page proposal showing how he would adapt the game and going through three months of "intense" broker dealing with the game publisher.

Solomon went on an 18-month-long trip across the world funding the film once a draft of the screenplay was completed, and most of the financing depended on foreign distribution rights. During the trip, he met a leading businessman in Asia named Allan Zeman, who viewed the 24-year-old as a "young, ambitious, artistic person" as well as a "convincing salesman" of a project based on an enterprise with a huge fanbase. In early 1992, Zeman and Solomon formed Sweetpea Entertainment to fund Dungeons & Dragons and sell it to other investors.

Originally, Solomon planned to have Dungeons & Dragons be a $100 million studio project with a big name in the director's chair; during development, Francis Ford Coppola, James Cameron, Renny Harlin, and Stan Winston were attached for directing the film at one point but dropped out. In addition to the script receiving positive coverage from the magazine Movieline, Premiere also announced the project in a 1995 issue when Winston was still signed on, revealing plot details such as a rogue lead, a magical dragon-controlling device, 14 creatures from the original game, and an effects-heavy final battle.

A majority of studios and directors loved the screenplay, but turned away due to a lack of recent successes in the big-budget fantasy genre and Justin Whalin's lack of star power. Solomon and the studios he encountered constantly conflicted with TSR, which wanted a direct-to-video release instead of the big-budget theatrical film the Canadian dreamed of. Cameron considered the project just before he did Titanic (1997), but the deal did not suffice due to TSR's failure to come up with a merchandising deal that appealed to 20th Century Fox, where Cameron worked. Potential deals with Paramount Pictures and Lightstorm Entertainment were also destroyed due to strong disagreements on how to finance the film. Solomon's amount of focus on getting the film green-lit caused the relationship with his girlfriend to break apart.

==== 1997–1998: Joel Silver and Wizards of the Coast ====
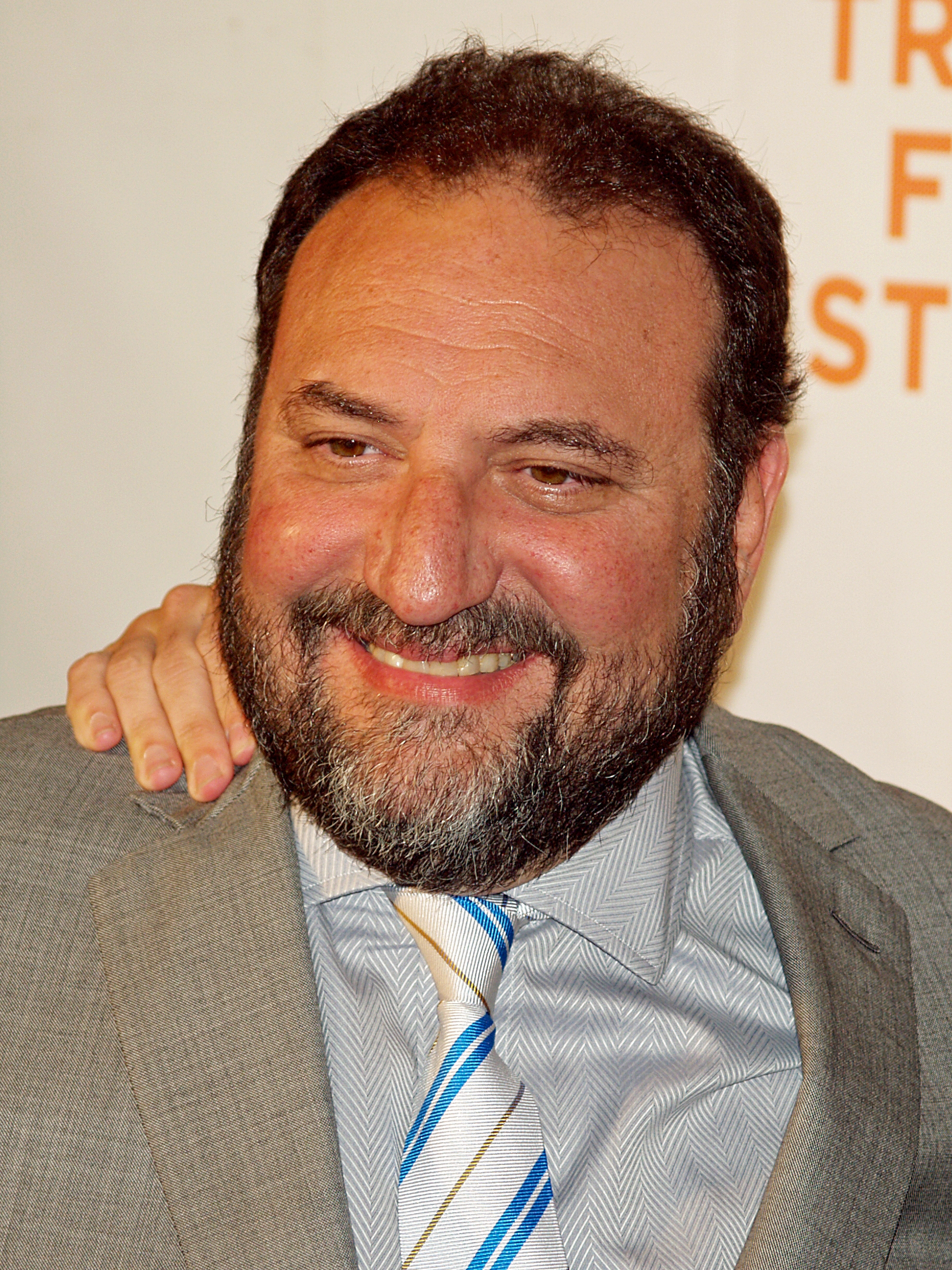
Joel Silver's role as executive producer helped gain Dungeons & Dragons more investors.

Joel Silver, an executive producer most notable for action films such as the Die Hard movies, joined the Dungeon & Dragons project in April 1997, and the screenplay was finalized in June 1997. Silver came in with the vision to make it a television series instead of a film. Solomon thus tried to incorporate that plan in his project; however, TSR sold the rights of the original game property to Wizards of the Coast, and despite TSR leader Lorraine Williams telling Solomon Wizards would allow a TV series, that ultimately was not the case.

The plan changed to a $3.5 million direct-to-video film, as the $100 million budget appeared too risky and TSR's set filming deadline was nearing; what allowed for the change was technological advancements decreasing required effects money, and the availability of Prague as a shooting location, which had several medieval-era-looking places and thus lessened the need of costly studio sets. Solomon became director and started test shooting a three-minute scene battle in Los Angeles in August 1997. Silver was so roused by it that he stayed on the project as executive producer and thus increased the project's credibility to the point where investors raised up to $30 million. This now made the production a theatrical one and also saved the producers from legal action by Wizards of the Coast, who argued it was not a "real" film. Zeman put the money up for the project, in addition to Solomon and his grandfather Joe Smuckler co-signing a $25,000 bank loan, to begin pre-production on February 9, 1998.

Due to filming in a Czech Republic location, Dungeons & Dragons' props and sets cost five times less than if shot in the United States. Although the final budget totaled to $35 million, the film was made with $21 million in cash during production, as there were several deferments in effects crew and actors' pay to meet its intended large scale. To maximize the quality of the film's effects with a limited budget, Solomon made equity deals between the effects houses involved so that less money was paid. At the time of its release, Dungeons & Dragons was the biggest-budget independent film ever produced.

=== Writing ===
Solomon began writing the script in 1991 based on the rules of the second edition of the basic Dungeons & Dragons game; he planned Dungeons & Dragons to be a film trilogy, his goal being to create "the Star Wars of the fantasy genres" using the original trilogy as a template for the story arcs. Two Miramax script doctors, Carroll Cartwright and Topper Lilien, were interviewed to be additional writers in April 1992, thanks to an executive's connection with Solomon.

To give the writers an idea of the quality expected in the screenplay, Solomon first required them to view 1980s fantasy films he felt showed the bad state of the genre at the time, and then adventure productions like Raiders of the Lost Ark (1981) and Ben-Hur (1959). The first draft of the film took eighteen months to complete. Solomon claimed the final product is a collection of different scenes from 16 drafts.

Although the class of characters and rules of Dungeons & Dragons are brought over to the film, Solomon decided to create a generic setting only loosely based on one of the lesser-known game settings, Mystara; he felt using specific campaign settings heavily dependent on player interpretation would confuse viewers. He also had to risk the combat actions not reflecting how players would use them; for example, "somebody could be casting one of those spells and standing there for ten minutes until the spell is ready to go," explained Solomon. Spells were occasionally altered if their original descriptions were not "visual" enough to be present on screen; for instance, a Mind Flayer in the film controls another character by going inside him rather than controlling him from a distance. Another small creative liberty was the red dragons being more powerful than the gold dragons.

=== Casting ===
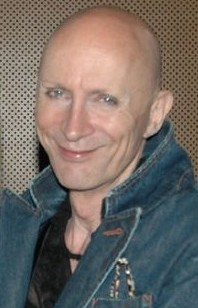
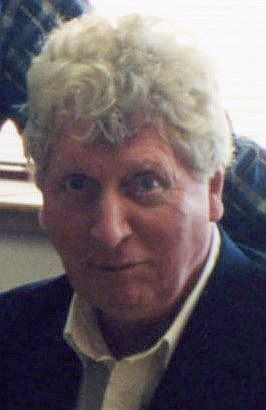
Dungeons & Dragons's London casting location opened the door for cameos by notable British actors such as Richard O'Brien (left) and Tom Baker (right)

The cast of Dungeons & Dragons was a mixture of established film actors and up-and-comers in Hollywood. Most of the casting took place in London starting April 21, 1999, due to the Prague shooting location; this resulted in the inclusion of actors like the Fourth Doctor actor Tom Baker and Richard O'Brien, whom Solomon cast with knowledge of his performance as Riff Raff in The Rocky Horror Picture Show (1975), a film released the same year as the first Dungeons & Dragons game. A-list actors were mostly avoided for leads in order for the characters to look like "normal" players of a Dungeons & Dragons match.

For the part of Ridley, in particular, Solomon looked for "someone who wasn't a movie star but who could be." Whalin, a Lois & Clark: The New Adventures of Superman star who had disinterest in most fantasy films, became a part of the project due to a strong friendship between him and Solomon; he was the only one to join the project before the start of pre-production, entering in December 1997, and had to reject several other acting offers to make himself available. Thora Birch was cast for the project shortly after she finished filming American Beauty (1999) and before she became a breakthrough actress once it was released; she chose to play the positive-minded empress Savina to get herself out of the somber psyche she put herself in for her role in American Beauty. Birch, Whalin, and Kristen Wilson were cast before the start of principal photography.

Mark Leahy, a producer who was involved in the writing for a year and a half working on revisions of Solomon, Cartwright and Lilien's original script that were mostly rejected, was the one who conceived the cast being as ethnically diverse as possible; as he explained, "I thought this film had (and has) a chance to really be something special, and knowing that I hated the thought of a bunch of kids watching a great story in another world-where there are only white people." Leahy originally wrote the elf Liana (later named Norda) to be a black elf, but after contention from his peers, he changed her race to Asian; she was a black elf in the final cut. Leahy wrote what would become Snails as an African-American half-orc in his versions, although this was considered poor taste by his colleagues. He also wrote all members of the mage empire to be Asians.

Wilson, after reading the script, wanted to play Norda specifically due to the character's enigma; as she elaborated, "her position within the royal court world....the power that she has, certainly psychologically ..and she's a mystic...and then she's this incredible warrior. And she doesn't really let on too much.. but you can look in her eyes.. and you can see that she's not somebody to be trifled with." In fact, she was so committed to being cast as the elf that when calling the casting director, Wilson demanded to meet Solomon in person and tell him, "I'm Norda." The meeting happened, with Solomon and the other producers agreeing with Wilson. The director claimed to have cast Wilson as Norda for the same reasons she liked the character: "She's serious and mysterious and very, very cool [...] But when you look at her she doesn't look like some sort of prosthetic elf, she looks like she's another race. When you see her in the film, she's got these wild eyes, this wild exotic look, and she looks like a Dark Elf, which is great, because it's what she's supposed to be."

Lee Arenberg and Irons joined during filming, with Irons the last actor to get on board; he did so through the connection of Silver, who previously worked with him on Die Hard with a Vengeance (1995). He initially rejected the opportunity as he was overseeing the renovation of a Ballydehob castle he purchased named Kilcoe. However, Silver then sent a package to Irons made for him by Solomon, which included the script and sketches of the look of the film; this plus his desire to try out a commercial fantasy production and Solomon's decade-long tenacity to get the screenplay produced made Irons get on board during filming on July 14, 1999.

The trickiest characters to cast were Elwood and Savina. As Solomon explained the dwarf, "The way I saw the D&D; dwarf was not like a hobbit, they're sort of in-between a human and a hobbit. They're smaller than an elf, too, so it was hard finding somebody with the height requirements, but also somebody who's going to be bulky like a dwarf as well." Arenberg was chosen to portray Elwood, although before he was cast American Job (1996) star Charlie Smith was a contender for the role. The producers originally look for an actor under five feet, but Arenberg went in the audition room and told them, "I have a few more inches but a foot more talent than the other short people." When looking for the empress Savina, according to Solomon, "that was one of the toughest characters to cast because I was looking to find somebody that young to play the role, because that's what that character called for, but I also needed somebody with a depth to her and understanding that's beyond her years."

== Production ==
=== Filming location ===
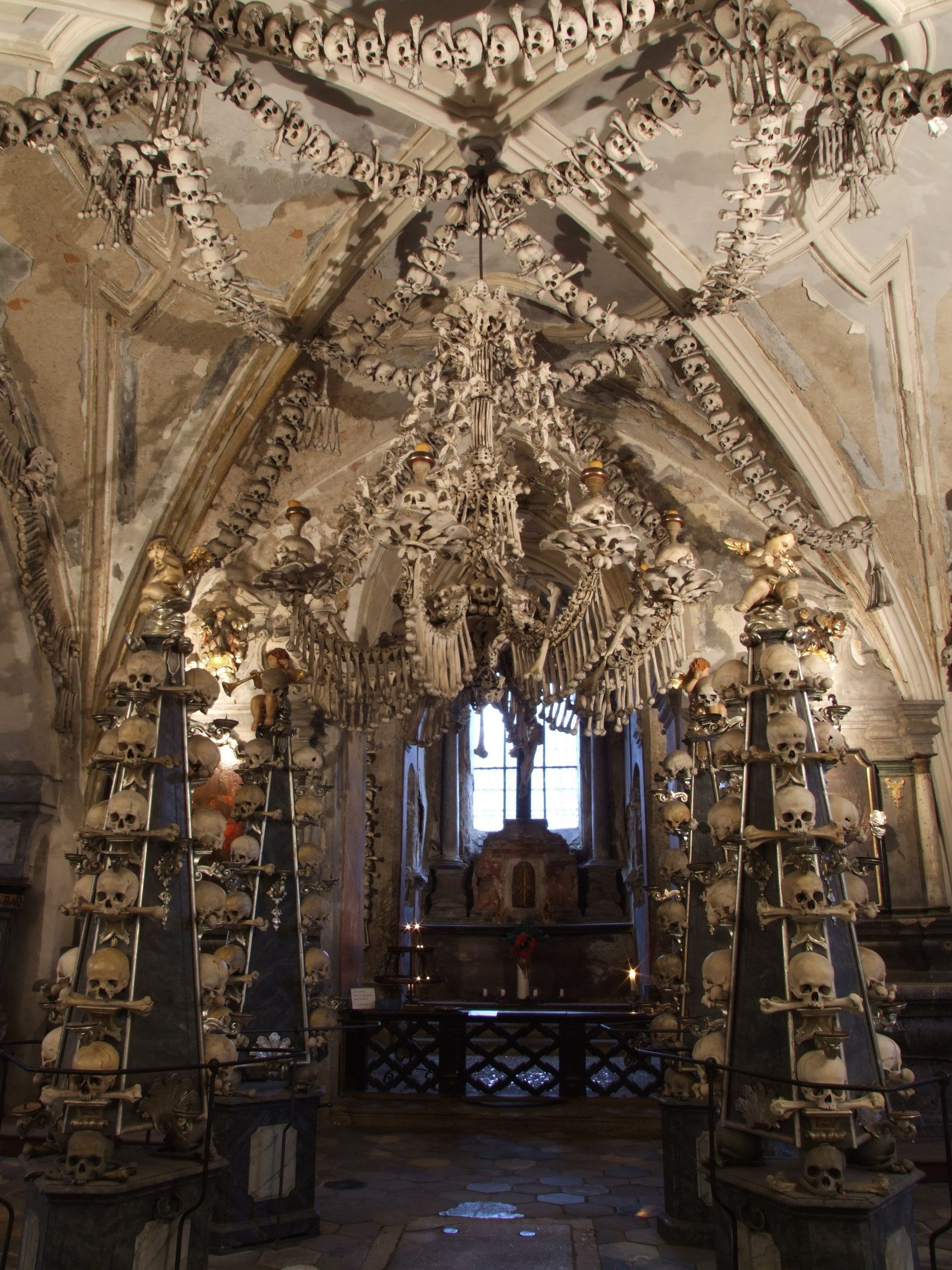
The Sedlec Ossuary was the interior for Profion's lair.

I was horrified, frightened and terrified, obviously, but after going through these different directors, and seeing these different visions, I felt like I had been so close to it for so long that I finally had to do it.

— Solomon on the feeling he had of having to direct the film on his own when shooting started.

Shooting of Dungeons & Dragons took place from May 28 to the middle of August 1999 in Prague, with a two-week rehearsal period that included eight days of a cast read-through at Solomon's apartment just before. 2,000 extras were provided by Prague's casting agency Sagitarius, with each battle consisting of around 35 stuntmen and five of the leads at most. While working on Dungeons & Dragons, Snails actor Marlon Wayans was also filming Requiem for a Dream (2000), meaning he had to go back and forth from Prague to New York and deadlines for fight scenes involving the character became very strict.

While real places were leased for sets, work of the film was also done at Barrandov Studios. Dungeon & Dragons was the first feature-length film to use the Sedlec Ossuary, which serves as the interior for Profion's lair, as a location; the church was decorated by František Rint with 40,000 skeletons of people who died as the result of the Black Death. The Magic Council meetings were filmed at the city's State Opera house, and Irons described them as the most difficult to shoot due to the amount of blue screen work and dialogue involved. Other sites used for sets included Kacina Castle, Rabi Castle, Svaty Mikulas church, Lipnice Castle, the Alkazar Quarry, St. Nicholas' Cathedral, the Doksany Crypt, the Strahov Library and the Dejvice Sewers.

=== Directing ===
Solomon tried to make Dungeons & Dragons unlike other big-budget films that focused the most on effects and not on plot, and was especially careful to make the battle scenes with the dragons not too "cheesy." Producer Kia Jam described Solomon's method of directing and producing as different from how other major studios would create fantasy productions: "they never seem to get it right because I think they replace a true fantasy feel with exorbitant amounts of money in order to achieve it superficially. The feeling has to come from a central source and here that's Corey." One major deviation from other fantasy films was the otherworldliness of the setting, whereas similar products would take place or be heavily inspired by the Middle Ages.

At the same time, the director still went for a strong "wow factor" with the film, where "you have to be able to say 'wow' at least ten times in the first 30 minutes." The two toughest scenes for the cast and crew to film were the maze scene and the concluding battle. The battle is eleven minutes long, required more than 280 shots, and was filmed on a 360-degree panoramic blue screen stage due to it involving more than 150 computer-generated dragons; it was tough for the actors as they had to fight while imagining dragons were around them, and it was tough for the director because the actors could not interact with the dragons that would be imposed in post-production later.

Despite playing a dwarf, Arenberg was a 5'8" actor, which meant he had to stoop his head, squat while still, move with his legs apart, and have extensive costuming in order to look short. He described his role as the hardest he'd ever done, primarily due to having to perform actions scenes while wearing a red beard that "itched like crazy" and "about 50 pounds of clothing complete with padding." When directing Wayans' improvisational method of acting, Solomon offered him the ability to perform three ad-libs in exchange for properly saying three lines in the script. O'Brien also improvised lines, such as "oh, what a romantic notion" in a scene after Ridley goes through the Thieve's Maze; the line was scripted as "honor is for fools, my friend," but the actor dismissed it as "cliched swords-and-sworcery kind of dialog."

=== Fight choreography ===
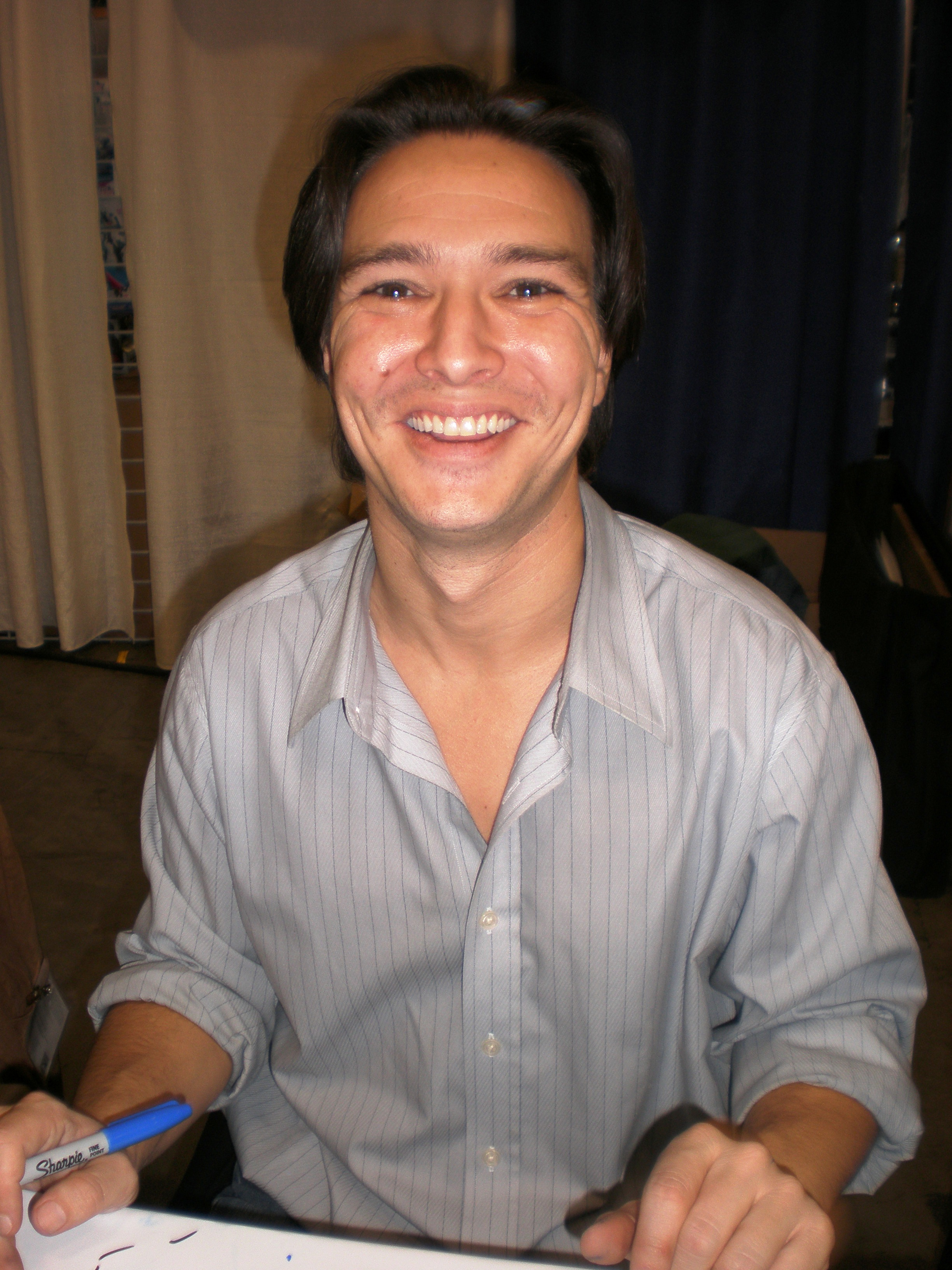
Most of the stunts were performed by the main cast, including Justin Whalin.

Apart from Wayans, who played the game during his high school years, and Arenberg who was a casual player, none of the leads were familiar with the original game; Jeremy Irons learned a bit about it from his sons who were fans, and Whalin prepared for his role by watching Dungeons & Dragons games in person, but then "realized that it seemed to be mostly about arguing" and "just put my trust in the script." While not a player, Wilson's knowledge of the game came from groups of her high school peers playing it: "I remembered stories that I heard about kids committing suicide, and all this other nutty stuff. But I didn't really know anything about it. I knew that it was a fantasy game ..a roleplaying game and THAT interested me." When working on the battle sequences, Solomon and the actors had a strong emphasis on making sure they followed the rules of the original game.

Solomon and the producers intended Dungeons & Dragons to be a "fun" film that would appeal to younger audiences and fans of the game, which explains the over-the-top performances by actors such as Irons; however, the director also tried to push the PG-13 rating with the violence in the battle sequences. In trying to make the fight scenes have as much realism as possible, Solomon and the choreographers not only used blood and gore, but also had the actors use real swords. Due to the long amount of time a fight scene would be choreographed and filmed, several "repeat blades" of swords were built and used; a total of six repeat blades were made for Damodar's sword, two of them broken during shooting.

Most of the principal actors did the stunts themselves, with choreographer Graeme Crowther recalling only "two or three" times a double was required; in fact, when shooting the Thief's Maze sequence on the film's last day of principal photography, Whalin intentionally wanted the first 300-pound steel axe as close as possible to him in the frame, which Solomon agreed. Instances where Whalin was doubled by Theo Kypri consist mostly of acrobatic shots. The actors' fighting styles varied from Ridley's "quick and dirty" yet "smooth" movements to Elwood's hardcore methods to Norda's artsy "fluid," art-like maneuvering, which Wilson attributed to her background in dancing. Whalin's experience in taekwondo also aided in his fighting skills.

=== Practical effects ===
Given that Dungeons & Dragons was filmed in Prague, some of the special effects work also took place there, with computer-generated work done in Britain and Germany. The special effects team consisted of George Gibbs, Martin Astles, and Matthew O'Toole of Bob Keen's company Image Effects. Given that the city's local sites were extremely cheap, with Solomon hyperbolizing that "sometimes our daily budget was like 15 US dollars," that made room for a high effects budget of $13 million. However, the effects team had some difficulties. Most of the conception process involved members coming up with various concepts but never agreeing to final designs, meaning compromises had to be determined under deadlines during filming; Astles suggested more time could've been saved if the crew simply borrowed from Dungeons & Dragons books instead of trying to "cleverly expand" the game's universe.

According to Gibbs, the workflow was made even more burdensome by the "communist" nature of the Czech Republic's film industry, especially for a big-scale fantasy film. The country's recently passed importing laws prevented the makeup people from using the glue specifically designed for the elf ears, meaning the elf actors had to wear more incompatible adhesives. There were also scheduling delays due to properties such as weapons and castle walls made by the Czech crew being poorly manufactured and having to be redone.

Human-crafted special effects included the steel axes in the maze scene, the Corridor of Eyes made all out of stones, and the poly-glass crystals on the balustrade walls of the Magic school, the most challenging one being to reproduce the crystals into breakaway glass. For creating the quicksand carpet, a water tank that made up two meters of the floor was used; it was filled with 6,000 liters of Quaker Oats (the only thickening substance available that did not sink to the ground) on a platform lifted up and down by a scissor lift. There were issues the effects crew did not foresee with the use of the porridge, such as it bubbling away into the air as a reaction to a preservative used to keep it from being moldy. With the carpet scene requiring three takes, Wayans described it as "probably the worst thing I've ever had to do in a movie. I grew up in the projects eating oatmeal, and I didn't want to ever eat it again, anyway. Now I really want to stay away from it."

== Post-production ==
=== Digital effects ===
The computer effects were done by Station X and Blankety Blank. Station X's founder, Grant Boucher, had experience in writing for Star Wars: The Roleplaying Game and offered free advice to the crew despite not officially considered part of the production. When filming began, Boucher predicted a total of around 200 shots with digital effects and 75 dragons in the film's climax. After filming finished, Solomon claimed the number of shots with digital effects to be 550 and computer-generated settings and characters to be 15, with more than 150 dragons in the climatic showdown. Allen Crawford, a Station X animator, declared four months of computer effects work was spent on the movie's first minute. There were also concepts originally planned to be practical effects but were computer-generated in the final edit; this included the gyroscope that holds the scepter, which was initially a machine-controlled device where all attempts for the motors to control it properly failed, and Dexter the pocket dragon which was planned to be an animatronic dragon.

For the dragons, the animators focused the most on their flying and diving cycles, using hawks and eagles as references, as well as their skin, where reptiles such as crocodiles were observed in producing the textures. While the dragons were computer-generated, the fire they blew was done using practical effects, and to be digitally incorporated, the flame throwers were filmed outside during the night time and blown into a steel set hanging on its side.

=== Music ===
Justin Burnett was hired as the composer for Dungeons & Dragons, beginning with scoring the test sequence Solomon filmed to convince Silver to become executive producer; the director ordered Burnett to create a John Williams-esque score, specifically in the style of Raiders of the Lost Ark, which was a change of the rock orchestral rock style he used when composing for German television series. It was the composer's third full-length film and his first to use live symphonic orchestra arrangements, with samples for percussion and a few ethnically-tinged instruments; with a "mock-up" score written in a digital sequencer, it was then performed by the Perth Symphony Orchestra in seven recording sessions engineered by Mal Luker. Themes in the score include those for Savina, Profion, Damodar, Ridley and Marina's relationship, Ridley and Snails' friendship, and a "payoff" theme for Ridley inspired by Williams' one for Indiana Jones.

== Promotion and release ==
Production, release and plot information about the film, as well as original game creator Dave Arneson's time on set, were all discussed at the August 1999 Gen Con seminar "History of Roleplaying Games," hosted by Boucher and Arneson. Role-playing supplements of the film were also announced in development at the same convention. The film's official website went online in September 1999. Another unofficial website of information about the project, Dndmovie.com, run by Donald C. Whetsell, went online in November 1999, garnering more than 1.5 million hits by August 2000 and "unusual levels of press and consumer interest," claimed a New Line Cinema press release. On February 10, 2000, DnDmovie posted two photographs: a screenshot of the meeting between the mages, and a behind-the-scenes photo of Robert Miano waiting on a chair to act in a scene. On May 19, 2000, it revealed a teaser poster.

When principal photography finished, the release date was planned at the earliest to be August 2000, which would coincide with the publication of the third edition of the game, or Halloween 2000 at the latest if post-production went on longer than expected.

The trailer was presented at the 2000 Dragon Con event, where Whalin and Solomon was also at the event to discuss the film.

On August 14, 2000, New Line Cinema, a distributor with prior success in genre films and game adaptations like Mortal Kombat (1995), bought the American distribution rights of Dungeons & Dragons, as well as option rights for a prequel and sequel and television syndication rights, for $5 million. New Line set the domestic release date sometime near the end of the year; the producers originally wanted the release to be in the spring or summer of 2001 to open up more time for setting up licensing and tie-in deals, but none of Warner Bros' divisions agreed to it. Ain't It Cool News writer Harry suggests New Line made the deal to excite the fantasy film fanbase into a much larger production of the genre, The Lord of the Rings: The Fellowship of the Ring (2001). International sales rights were held by J&M Entertainment.

Neal Barrett Jr. wrote the novel Dungeons & Dragons: The Movie, based on the film.

== Reception ==
=== Box office ===
The film opened at #5 at the North American box office making US$7,237,422 in its opening weekend. The film went on to gross $15,220,685 in the domestic box office, short of the film's $45 million budget, and with an international gross of $18,586,724, coming up with a worldwide total of $33,807,409.

=== Critical response ===
On the review aggregator website Rotten Tomatoes, 9% of 93 critics' reviews are positive, with an average rating of 3.2/10. The website's consensus reads: "Critics say this movie has a cheap look and is badly directed. Despite the presence of talented actors, the performances are really bad, and additionally, some people are offended at Marlon Wayans' character, calling it a racist throwback to black stereotypes." Metacritic, which uses a weighted average, assigned the film a score of 14 out of 100, based on 25 critics, indicating "overwhelming dislike". Audiences surveyed by CinemaScore gave the film a grade of "C+" on a scale of A to F.

Geoff Pevere of the Toronto Star called the film "A wheezy quest story steeped in hobbity gibberish and second-hand Star Wars costumery, featuring a cast so uniformly uncharismatic you may pine for the methody depths of Kerwin Mathews (apart, of course, from the reversely charismatic Irons), the movie has the cheap software look of something found on the Space channel at 4 a.m.". Steve Biodrowski of mania.com comments: "Let's just say that if it weren't for Lost Souls (also a New Line release, coincidentally), this would be a strong contender for the Worst Film of the Year." In February 2010, the readers of Empire voted Dungeons & Dragons the 39th worst film of all time.

A. O. Scott panned the fight choreography, computer-generated effects, and Birch's acting, and compared the dialogue and pacing to that of the Pokémon films.

Solomon blamed the quality of the film on its investors and license-holders' interference, as well as his own inexperience in filmmaking. He states that he had only intended to produce the film, but was forced to direct by his investors after nearly a decade of complications dealing with TSR and Wizards of the Coast. He also claims that he was forced to use an older script despite having written an updated version that fit the Dungeons and Dragons license better.

=== Awards and nominations ===
Award	Category	Subject	Result
Stinkers Bad Movie Awards	Worst Picture	Courtney Solomon	Nominated
Stinkers Bad Movie Awards	Worst Picture	Thomas M. Hammel	Nominated
Stinkers Bad Movie Awards	Worst Picture	Kia Jam	Nominated
Stinkers Bad Movie Awards	Worst Picture	Steve Richards	Nominated
Stinkers Bad Movie Awards	Worst Sense of Direction	Courtney Solomon	Nominated
Stinkers Bad Movie Awards	Worst Supporting Actor	Jeremy Irons	Nominated
Stinkers Bad Movie Awards	Worst Supporting Actress	Thora Birch	Nominated
Stinkers Bad Movie Awards	Worst On-Screen Group	The entire cast	Nominated
Stinkers Bad Movie Awards	Most Intrusive Musical Score	Justin Caine Burnett	Nominated
Stinkers Bad Movie Awards	Least "Special" Special Effects		Nominated
Stinkers Bad Movie Awards	Most Unfunny Comic Relief	Marlon Wayans as Snails	Nominated
Young Artist Awards	Best Supporting Young Actress	Thora Birch	Nominated
Saturn Awards	Cinescape Genre Face of the Future Award	Thora Birch	Nominated

== Roleplaying game ==
Wizards of the Coast released a Fast-Play Game based on the movie called "The Sewers of Sumdall". It is a DVD-ROM feature on the DVD as a printable PDF file.

== Reboot ==
Starting in 2015, a new Dungeons & Dragons film began development at Warner Bros. Pictures with the film reportedly starring Ansel Elgort and Rob Letterman directing. In December 2017, after varying degrees of progression the film was moved to Paramount Pictures, Sweetpea Entertainment, and Allspark Pictures, scheduled for release date of July 23, 2021. That same year, Joe Manganiello, an avid fan of the role-playing game, took it upon himself to revitalize the progression of a film adaptation. The actor revealed that he had been negotiating the rights to make the film, while Manganiello and John Cassel were hired to co-write the script for the project.

By February 2018, the project had reentered development as a co-production with Brian Goldner and Stephen Davis producing from Paramount Pictures, and Allspark Pictures. Negotiations began with Chris McKay to serve as director. David Leslie Johnson-McGoldrick had completed a draft of the script. In March 2019, it was revealed that Michael Gillio had completed a rewrite of Johnson-McGoldrick's work with studio executives expressing excitement for the film. The studio began negotiations to casting for the roles.

In July 2019, John Francis Daley and Jonathan Goldstein entered early negotiations to direct the film. By January 2020, the filmmaking duo announced that they had co-written a new draft of the script.

The film, entitled Honor Among Thieves, was released in March 2023. Starring Chris Pine, Michelle Rodriguez, Regé-Jean Page, Justice Smith, Sophia Lillis and Hugh Grant, it received largely positive reviews from critics and audiences, but was commercially unsuccessful.

== Bibliography ==
- Jones, Alan (December 2000a). "Dungeons & Dragons". Cinefantastique. Vol. 32, no. 4/5. pp. 24–26, 29–30.
- Jones, Alan (December 2000b). "Dungeons & Dragons: Special Effects". Cinefantastique. Vol. 32, no. 4/5. pp. 27–28.
- Jones, Alan (December 2000c). "Dungeons & Dragons: Jeremy Irons". Cinefantastique. Vol. 32, no. 4/5. pp. 30–31.
- Sauriol, Patrick (May 1999). "Lights... Camera... Dragon!". InQuest. No. 49. Wizard Entertainment. pp. 22–23.
