= Vicenç Badalona Ballestar =

Spanish painter (1929–2014)

- Born: 1929; Barcelona, Spain
- Died: 7 July 2014 (aged 84–85); Barcelona, Spain
- Other name: Vicente B. Ballestar

Vicenç Badalona Ballestar (1929 – 7 July 2014) was a Spanish painter and author.

== Life and work ==
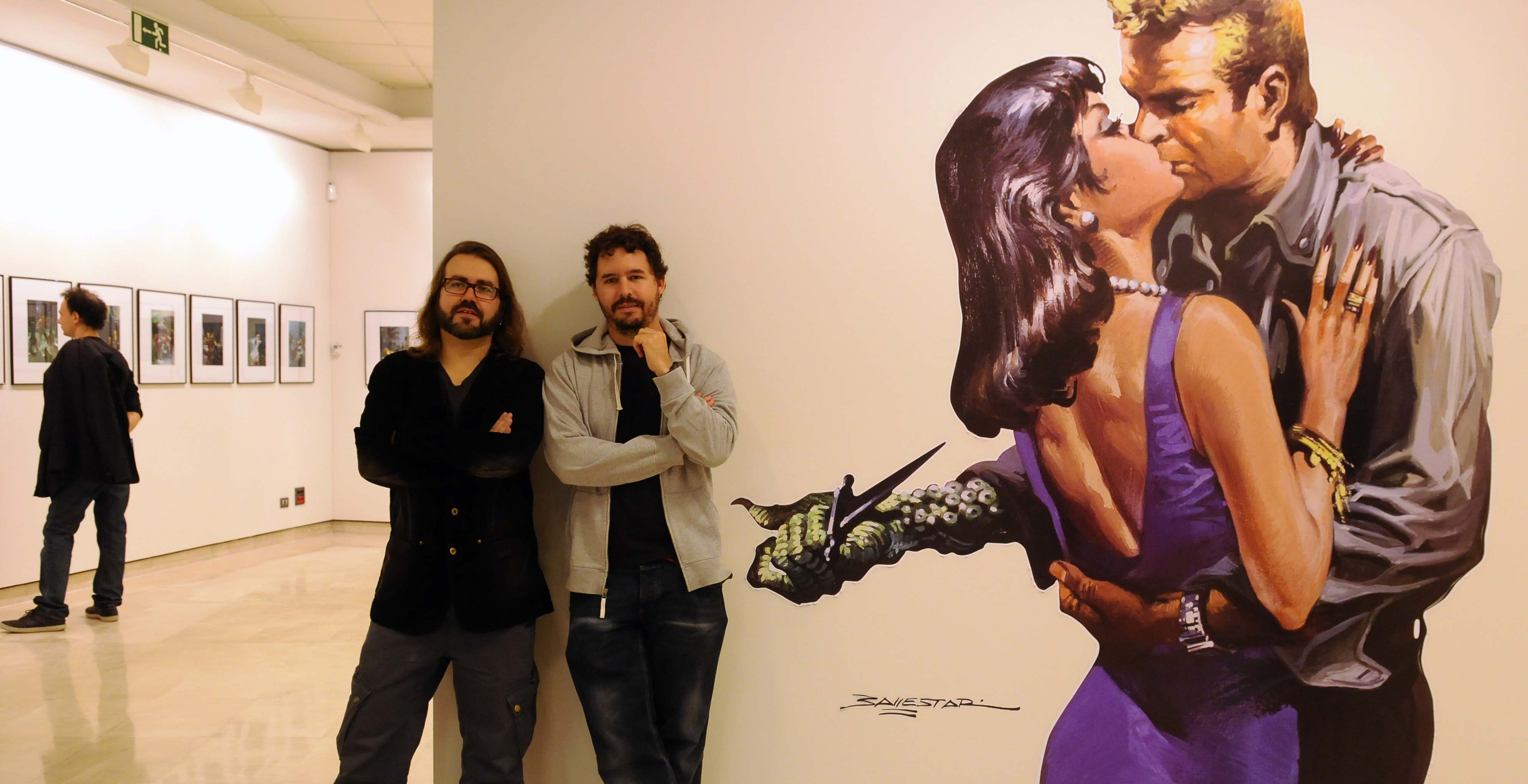
Artwork by Vicente B. Ballestar (right) at the 2011 exhibition "Pulp Visions" at the Casa de Cultura Okendo in San Sebastián

Vicenç Badalona Ballestar, born in 1929, studied at the School of Art at La Lotja and at Baixas Academy in Barcelona. Among the best known works of Ballestar are certainly his titles to images for the Dime novels series called John Sinclair. Over the decades he has also created numerous other designs and illustrations, including for the Western bestselling series GF Unger, another imprint of the German Bastei Lübbe publishing house.

Ballestar was a member of the Catalan painter Watercolor Association and received an honorary medal of the association. 1988 one of his paintings was accepted into the City Museum of Nimes, where he often exhibited, besides the cities of Madrid, Barcelona, Ceret and Collioure.

Like many other Spanish artists, his works were admired at the beginning in collective exhibitions in Spain and Italy. In addition to the German Bastei-Verlag he worked also for the publishers Hale, Cleveland, Semic, Senic and Winther and beyond that Ballestar has published as an author numerous textbooks on painting.

As an artist, he is represented with posters in the collection of the Donau/Bund Österreichischer Gebrauchsgraphiker.

His funeral was held at the cemetery Tanatorio Sancho de Ávila in Barcelona on 9 July 2014. Ballestar was honorary president of the Agrupació d'Aquarel.

== Literature ==
- Vicente Ballestar in: Who's who in graphic arts: an illustrated world review of the leading contemporary graphic and typographic designers, illustrators and cartoonists; with a short illustrated history of the graphic arts, De Clivo, 1982
