= Bahar Yilmaz =

German author

Bahar Yilmaz (born 1984 in Ingolstadt) is a German writer, who also works as a life coach and lecturer.

== Biography ==
Yilmaz grew up with her sisters in Ingolstadt. Her parents are from Turkey. Trained at various spiritual schools, Yilmaz worked after graduation, among other things, as a sensitive and media consultant.

Her first work, was published by Ansata in 2011, and was written with Pascal Voggenhuber. Further monographs followed in the same publishing house, dealing with healing and self-healing, the human energy body, medial abilities and happiness. The book "You were written in the stars", published by Integral in 2019, entered the bestseller list of the Spiegel in the category non-fiction book.

Yilmaz processes her topics and insights not only in literary form, but also, for example, in contributions for social networks and her podcast entitled "New Spirit". She has been working as a "spiritual success coach" in Germany, Austria and Switzerland, meanwhile with her own practice. Yilmaz leads workshops and seminars, in which third parties are also trained according to her methods. She is also active as a speaker at various events, also with her partner Jeffrey Kastenmüller.

== Books ==
- Bahar Yilmaz, Pascal Voggenhuber (2011), Yoga Siddhis. Der geheime Weg zu Sensitivität und Medialität. (in German), München: Ansata, ISBN 978-3-7787-8228-6
- Bahar Yilmaz (2012), Trance Healing. Der mediale Weg zu Heilung und Selbstheilung. (in German), München: Ansata, ISBN 978-3-7787-7452-6
- Bahar Yilmaz (2013), Aura-Coaching. Die Transformation des Planeten und ihr Einfluss auf den Energiekörper des Menschen. (in German), München: Ansata, ISBN 978-3-7787-7474-8
- Bahar Yilmaz (2014), Der Ruf der Geistigen Welt. Wie Sie Ihre medialen Fähigkeiten aktivieren und nutzen. (in German), München: Ansata, ISBN 978-3-7787-7476-2
- Bahar Yilmaz (2017), Empower Yourself. Werde zum glücklichsten Menschen, den du kennst. (in German), München: Ansata, ISBN 978-3-7787-7523-3
- Bahar Yilmaz (2019), Du wurdest in den Sternen geschrieben. Erkenne, wie wundervoll du bist. (in German), München: Integral, ISBN 978-3-7787-9296-4
