= Pascal Voggenhuber =

Swiss author

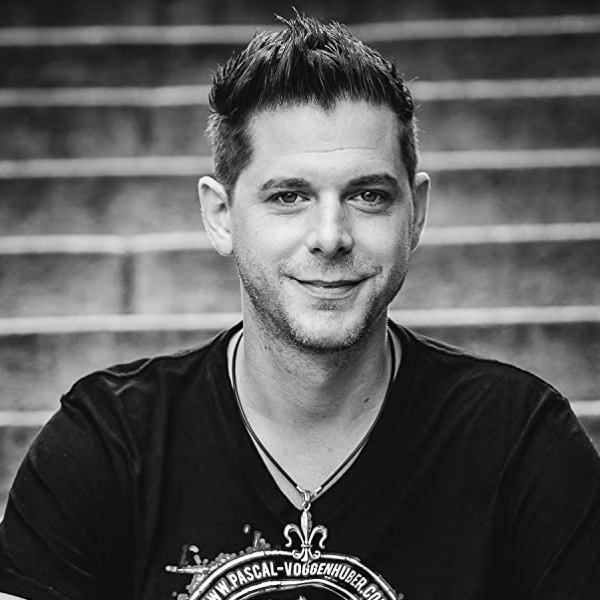
- Voggenhuber in 2018
- Born: February 11, 1980 (age 46); Switzerland
- Other names: Chris Grail
- Education: Arthur Findlay College
- Occupation: Author
- Website: Official website (in German)

Pascal Voggenhuber (born February 11, 1980, in Switzerland) is a Swiss non-fiction, thriller author and Copywriter. He has published 15 books so far and was awarded the GfK Award in 2017. He publishes his novels under his open pseudonym Chris Grail.

== Education ==
Voggenhuber claims to have acquired his (alleged) knowledge of the "supernatural world" at Arthur Findlay College in Stansted Mountfitchet, England, and in Switzerland. In 2009, he founded the Spirit Messenger Center in Sissach, Switzerland to train other media. Pascal Voggenhuber is originally a trained actor.

== Working methods and demands ==
Every year Pascal Voggenhuber gives a large number of lectures, seminars and workshops, mainly in Switzerland, Germany and Austria. He also appears regularly in so-called afterlife demonstrations. Numerous people follow Voggenhuber's performances, in which he says he talks live to a deceased relative of a spectator. He translates messages from the afterlife for the bereaved. In 2014, a multi-part documentary about the work of Pascal Voggenhuber was broadcast on Sat.1 Switzerland. The programme Das Medium - Nachricht aus dem Jenseits shows how he helps to cope better with grief in individual consultations. The programme also mentions that he uses his alleged abilities again and again to help the police in unsolved cases. The fact that this cooperation exists was also confirmed in the Johannes B. Kerner Show on Sat.1 in 2009. In the TV crime thriller Tatort: Zwischen zwei Welten, which was produced in Switzerland, there is the character Pablo Guggisberg, who is a medium that helps the police in their investigations. This figure should be based on Pascal Voggenhuber. In Germany, where the general public is unfamiliar with such cooperation, this crime scene episode was sometimes met with incomprehension. In individual cases, schools invite Pascal Voggenhuber to talk to students about his work and these topics, for example in physics lessons. Pascal Voggenhuber has written 14 books so far. Each of these 14 books was in the top 10 bestseller lists in Switzerland.

== Documentaries ==
- SRF (Schweizer Fernsehen): Pascal Voggenhuber, 2008
- Sat1(TV): Kerner: Pascal Voggenhuber, 2009
- Pascal Voggenhuber im Interview, 2016
- Pascal Voggenhuber im Interview, 2016
- Pascal Voggenhuber erklärt: Aura sehen lernen, 2016
- Pascal Voggenhuber im Interview, 2017

== Books ==
- Leben in zwei Welten. Geh Deinen Weg! New-Avalun, Sissach 2004; überarbeitete Taschenbuchausgabe: Bastei Lübbe, Bergisch Gladbach 2009, ISBN 978-3-404-61651-0.
- Nachricht aus dem Jenseits. Meine Kontakte mit Verstorbenen und der geistigen Welt. Giger, Altendorf 2008; Knaur, München 2010, ISBN 978-3-426-87493-6.
- Entdecke deinen Geistführer. Wie uns Engel und geistige Wesen begleiten. Giger, Altendorf 2009; Ullstein, Berlin 2012, ISBN 978-3-548-74548-0.
- Entdecke deine Sensitivität. Wie du deine übersinnlichen Fähigkeiten entwickeln kannst. Giger, Altendorf 2010; Ullstein, Berlin 2013, ISBN 978-3-548-74604-3.
- Yoga-Siddhis. Der geheime Weg zu Sensitivität und Medialität (zusammen mit Bahar Yilmaz). Lotos, München 2011, ISBN 978-3-7787-8228-6.
- Botschafter der unsichtbaren Welt. Wie der Dialog mit dem Jenseits unser Leben bereichert und heilt. Ansata, München 2011; Heyne, München 2012, ISBN 978-3-453-70214-1.
- Die Geistige Welt hilft uns. Rituale mit Engeln und Geistführern. Giger, Altendorf 2012, ISBN 978-3-905958-14-0.
- Kinder in der Geistigen Welt. Giger, Altendorf 2013, ISBN 978-3-905958-32-4.
- Zünde dein inneres Licht an Giger, Altendorf 2014, ISBN 978-3-905958-44-7.
- Enjoy this Life: Wie du dein ganzes Potential entfaltest Allegria Verlag, ISBN 978-3793423218.
- Enjoy this Life: In 30 Tagen zu dir selbst: Das Praxisbuch, Allegria Verlag, ISBN 379342331X
- Werde selbstbewusst im Schlaf: In 30 Tagen selbstsicher und glücklich, Enjoy this Life Verlag, ISBN 3906872963
- Nachricht aus dem Jenseits 2.0, Giger, ISBN 3906872831
- Love yourself: Weil du der wichtigste Mensch in deinem Leben bist, Giger, Altendorf 2019, ISBN 3907210026
- Heal yourself: Wie du deine Selbstheilungskräfte aktivierst, Giger, Altendorf 2021, ISBN 3039330292

== CDs ==
- Begegnung in der Stille. Schutzengel- und Geistführer-Meditationen. Nova MD Verlag, 2016, ISBN 978-3-9523202-8-0.
- Heilung durch Selbstheilung. Heilmeditationen. Nova MD Verlag, 2016, ISBN 978-3-9523532-1-9.
- Öffne dein drittes Auge. Meditation mit Suggestionen. Nova MD Verlag, 2016, ISBN 978-3-9611100-0-1.
- Glaub an dich. Meditation mit Suggestionen. Nova MD Verlag, 2016, ISBN 978-3961110124.
- Enjoy this Life-Geniesse dein Leben. Suggestionen. Lebensraum Verlag, 2016, ISBN 978-3903034303.
- Enjoy this Life-Gesunder Schlaf. Lebensraum Verlag, 2016, ISBN 978-3903034297.
