= František Rint =

Czech woodcarver and carpenter

- Born: 26 January 1835; Česká Skalice, Bohemia, Austrian Empire
- Occupations: Woodcarver, carpenter
- Known for: Sedlec Ossuary

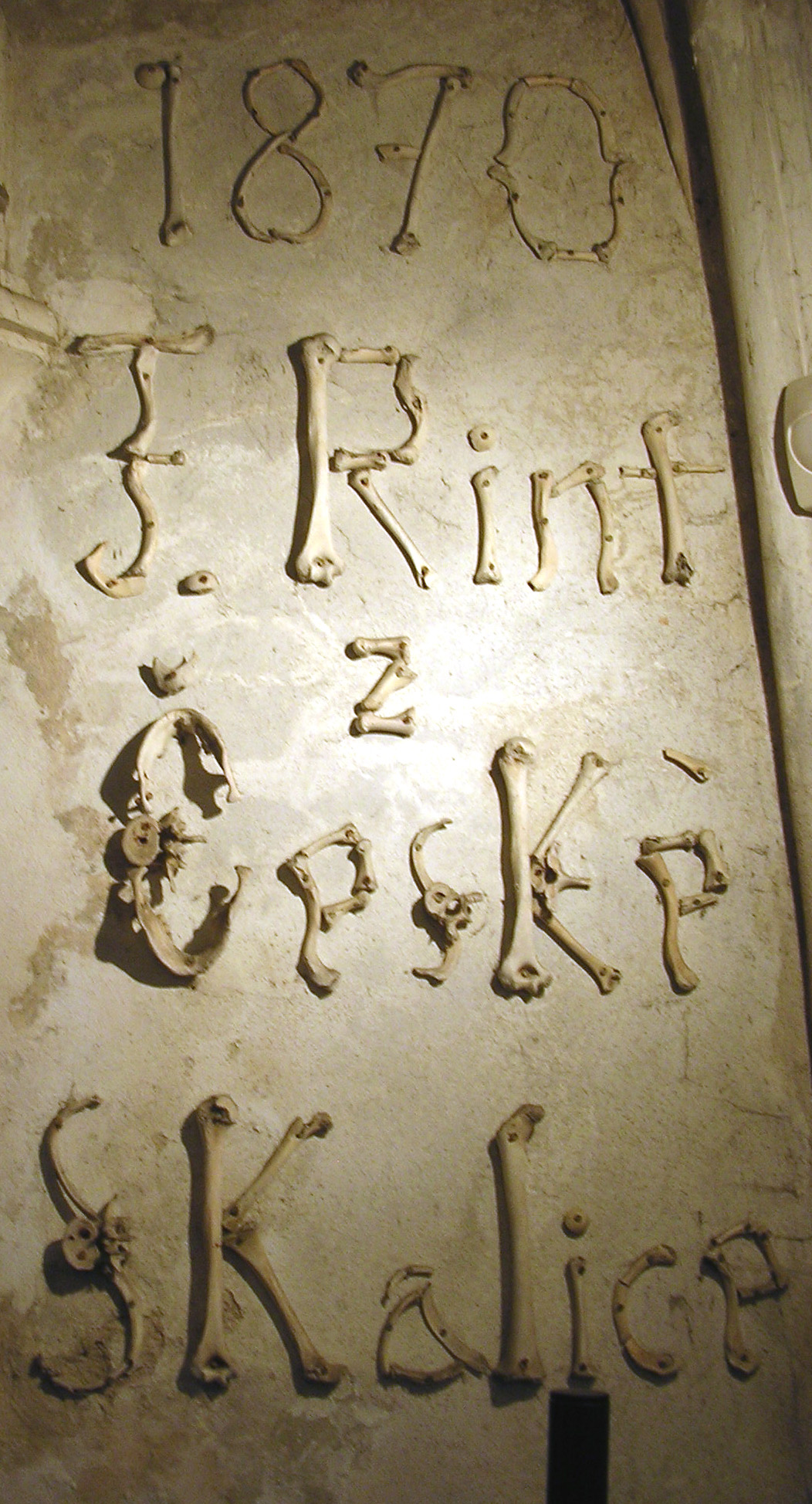
Signature of František Rint in the Sedlec Ossuary

František Rint (26 January 1835 – ?) was a Czech woodcarver and carpenter. He was employed by the House of Schwarzenberg to organise the human bones interred at the Sedlec Ossuary, a small Christian chapel in Sedlec, in 1870. He used the bones at Sedlec Ossuary to create elaborate, macabre sculptures, including four chandeliers and a copy of the coat of arms of the House of Schwarzenberg. According to the signature he left at the ossuary, Rint was from Česká Skalice, a small town in northern Bohemia.
