= Terence Wilton =

British actor (born 1943)

- Born: Terence John Wilton; 5 November 1943 (age 82); Brighton, England
- Other name: Terry Wilton
- Education: University of Manchester
- Occupations: Actor, teacher
- Notable work: Doctor Who: Invasion of the Dinosaurs (1974)
- Spouse: Lucy Tregear

Terence Wilton (born 5 November 1943) is a British actor, known for taking on the role of Arthur Kipps in The Woman in Black at the Fortune Theatre in the West End from 2017–2023.

TV and film roles include Henry Percy in Anne of the Thousand Days, the Duke of Aumerle in Shakespeare's Richard II, Edward Lycett Green in Edward the Seventh, and Sir Richard Vernon in Henry IV, Part 1 in the BBC Television Shakespeare series.

== Theatre ==
Originally from Brighton, Wilton was educated at Brighton Grammar School. While studying drama at Manchester University, he met stage director Stephen Joseph, who gave him his first acting job at his theatre in Scarborough and acted as a mentor to him. From there, it led the actor to performing with many theatrical companies including being leading man at the New Theatre Royal Lincoln, the Royal Shakespeare Company, the Old Vic (touring with Ian McKellen in Richard II and Edward II, as well as taking over the lead role of King Lear after Brian Blessed was taken ill), the Royal Exchange, Manchester, Regent's Park Open Air Theatre, the National Theatre and the Prospect Theatre Company (duelling against Derek Jacobi's Hamlet). Wilton has also toured in William Shakespeare productions in places such as the Great Hall of the People in Beijing, the Great Sphinx of Giza in Egypt, Fort Canning Park in Singapore, China, Australia, the USA, the Mediterranean and the Far East.

== Other work ==
Using the name Terry Wilton, he has provided voicework for computer games including Ken Follett's The Pillars of the Earth and the Trine series.

== Personal life ==
For a number of years, Wilton was in a relationship with actress Ishia Bennison. Together they had a daughter, Kate (b. 1969), who would follow in her parents' footsteps by becoming an actress. Eventually, he married actress Lucy Tregear. The couple along with Kate teach drama at Blackheath High School, where they offer LAMDA courses to students.
