= Jason Dark =

German writer (born 1945)

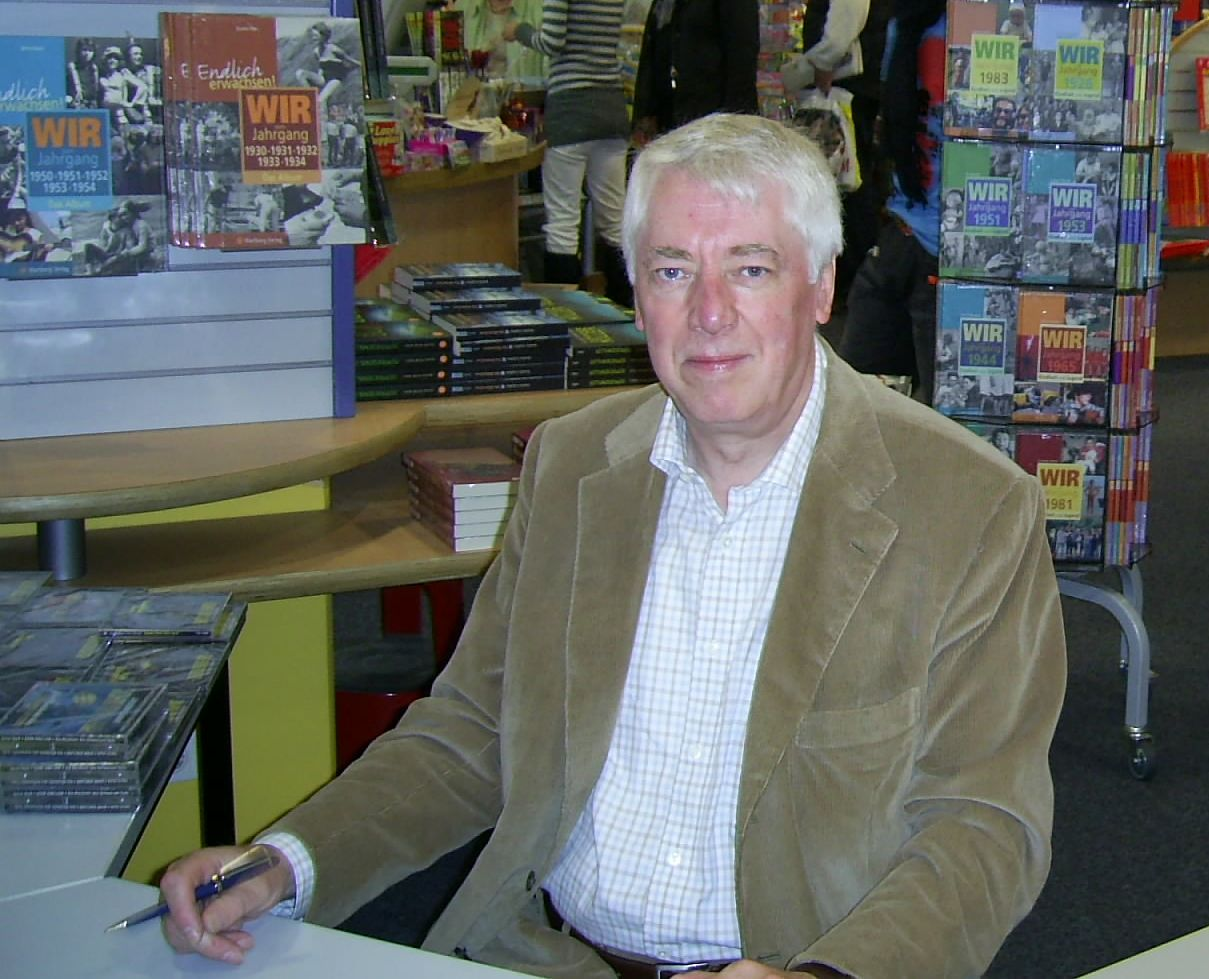
- Dark in 2008
- Born: Helmut Rellergerd; 25 January 1945 (age 81); Altena-Dahle, Sauerland, Germany
- Occupation: Author
- Writing career
- Pen name: Jason Dark
- Years active: 1973–present
- Genres: Horror, fantasy, detective fiction
- Website: Website Bastei-Verlag (in German)

Helmut Rellergerd (born 25 January 1945), known by the pen name Jason Dark, is a prolific author of horror detective fiction in the German language. He is known for creating the long-running dime novel series Geisterjäger John Sinclair, which has been ongoing since 1973 and is released weekly since 1978. As of 2020, the John Sinclair series sold more than 250 million novel copies and over 5 million audio drama units.

His work has been favourably compared to that of Sir Arthur Conan Doyle. Jason Dark is one of the most read authors in Germany in his genre.

== Career ==
Helmut Rellergerd was born in 1945 in Dahle, the Sauerland and grew up in Dortmund. He wrote his first novel after he had finished school and the Bundeswehr. However, this debut release was rejected by the publishers. The first novel published at Bastei Publishing House was Im Kreuzfeuer des Todesdrachen for the crime series Cliff Corner. In 1973, he wrote the novel Die Nacht des Hexers and created the fictional character John Sinclair. The Adventures of demon hunter Sinclair appear in the Bastei-Verlag in chap book and paperback format and became the most successful German horror series, branching out into audio plays and a short-lived TV series. Many novels have been translated into other languages.

Beyond the success of the John Sinclair series, Rellergerd created other horror fiction series like Professor Zamorra and Damona King. Under the pseudonym Red Geller he wrote the young adult book series Das Schloß-Trio. From 2006 on he wrote the crime fiction series Don Harris Psycho-Cop.

Rellergerd lives in a district of Bergisch Gladbach. He described himself as Catholic in an interview from 2008.

== John Sinclair ==
Starting in 1973, Jason Dark wrote horror detective stories of the pulp fiction variety, centred on an English Scotland Yard inspector named John Sinclair. The latter's surname was inspired by the "Sinclair" character played by Roger Moore in the popular 1970s TV series, The Persuaders. The stories, published in chap books of around 60 pages in length, have reached the number of more than 2,000 issues. The plots generally entail Inspector Sinclair's fighting against the forces of darkness (vampires, werewolves, sorcerers, zombies, etc.) and vanquishing them at the end of each tale. While writing the series alone for many years, in recent years Rellergerd became part of a team of writers.

The name of "Jason Dark" has humorous origins: Rellergerd's wife had a particular dislike for the fictitious English private investigator, Jason King, of the TV series of that name, and as a slightly malicious joke, Rellergerd decided to give his central character precisely the name of "Jason". The surname, "Dark", suggested itself quite naturally, as his hero constantly does battle against dark forces.

Jason Dark has been called a 'writer of genius' and a 'remarkable literary phenomenon' by literary scholar by Dr. Tony Page, who also points out how Dark has been favourably compared to Sir Arthur Conan Doyle: 'Jason Dark’s imaginative powers have rightly been praised. Indeed, Godden writes: "‘As regards imagination, Jason Dark towers houses high in superiority above Sherlock Holmes creator, Conon (sic!) Doyle.’ (Godden, 207: 293). This is eminent praise indeed - and is justly bestowed'.

== Views on writing and politics ==
Helmut Rellergerd has claimed that many people have found his novels to be psychologically and emotionally beneficial, particularly during times of illness (saying that they have contributed to the recovery process through John Sinclair's "optimistic attitude" to life).

When asked in 2006 what caused him the greatest fear and horror, he replied that it was George W. Bush's activities, particularly in Iraq: these called forth veritable goosebumps of fright upon his skin, he said.

== Publications (selection) ==
- Geisterjäger John Sinclair
- Das Schloß-Trio
- Don Harris Psycho-Cop

== Sources ==
- Radio interview with Helmut Rellergerd, 2006.
- Interview with Jason Dark
