= Bastei Lübbe =

German publisher

- Status: Active
- Founded: 1953
- Founder: Gustav Lübbe
- Country of origin: Germany
- Headquarters location: Cologne
- Distribution: National
- Key people: Stefan Lübbe
- Publication types: Books, Audiobooks, eBooks
- Fiction genres: Suspense, SF, Chick lit, Children's Books, Historical Fiction
- Imprints: Eichborn, Bastei Verlag, Luebbe Audio
- Official website: www.luebbe.de

Bastei Lübbe is a major publisher of genre fiction, pulp fiction and non-fiction in the German language. It is based in Cologne, Germany. In 2010, it was the largest independent book publisher in Germany, and it claimed to be one of the three largest audiobook publishers in Germany.

== History ==
The company was begun in 1953 by newspaper editor Gustav H. Lübbe, when he became the publisher of the insolvent Cologne-based company, Bastei-Verlag. The company then changed its name to Bastei-Verlag Gustav H. Lübbe, and later to Verlagsgruppe Lübbe in 2000, then Bastei Lübbe in 2010.

Bastei Lübbe was responsible for the German language release of Dan Brown's The Da Vinci Code, and has recently begun to enter English, Spanish and Chinese language publishing markets for ebooks. It went public on the Frankfurt Stock Exchange on 8 October 2013, and in May 2014, it purchased a 51% controlling stake in Daedalic Entertainment, a German video game developer and publisher based in Hamburg.
