= Portuguese architecture =

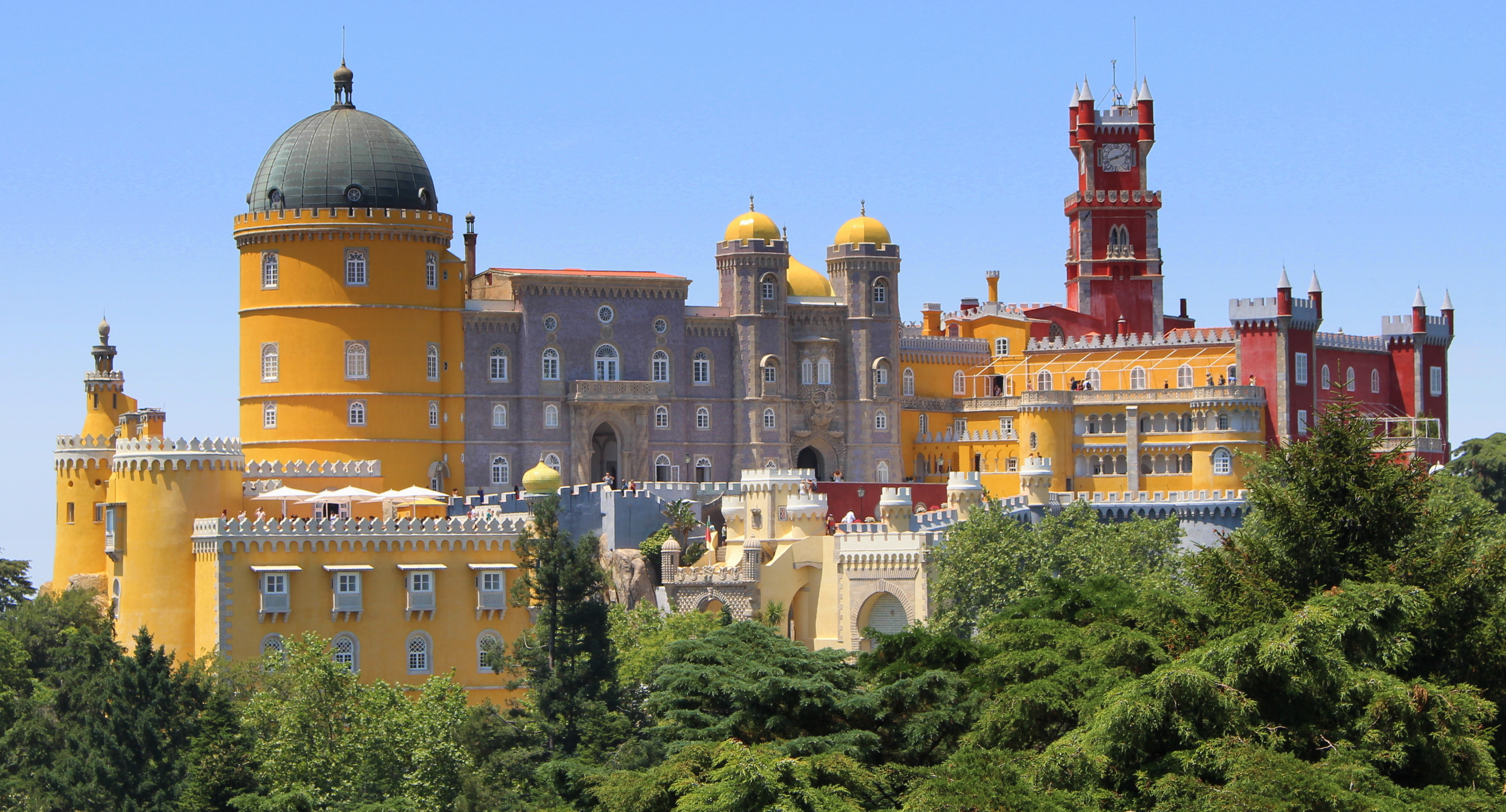
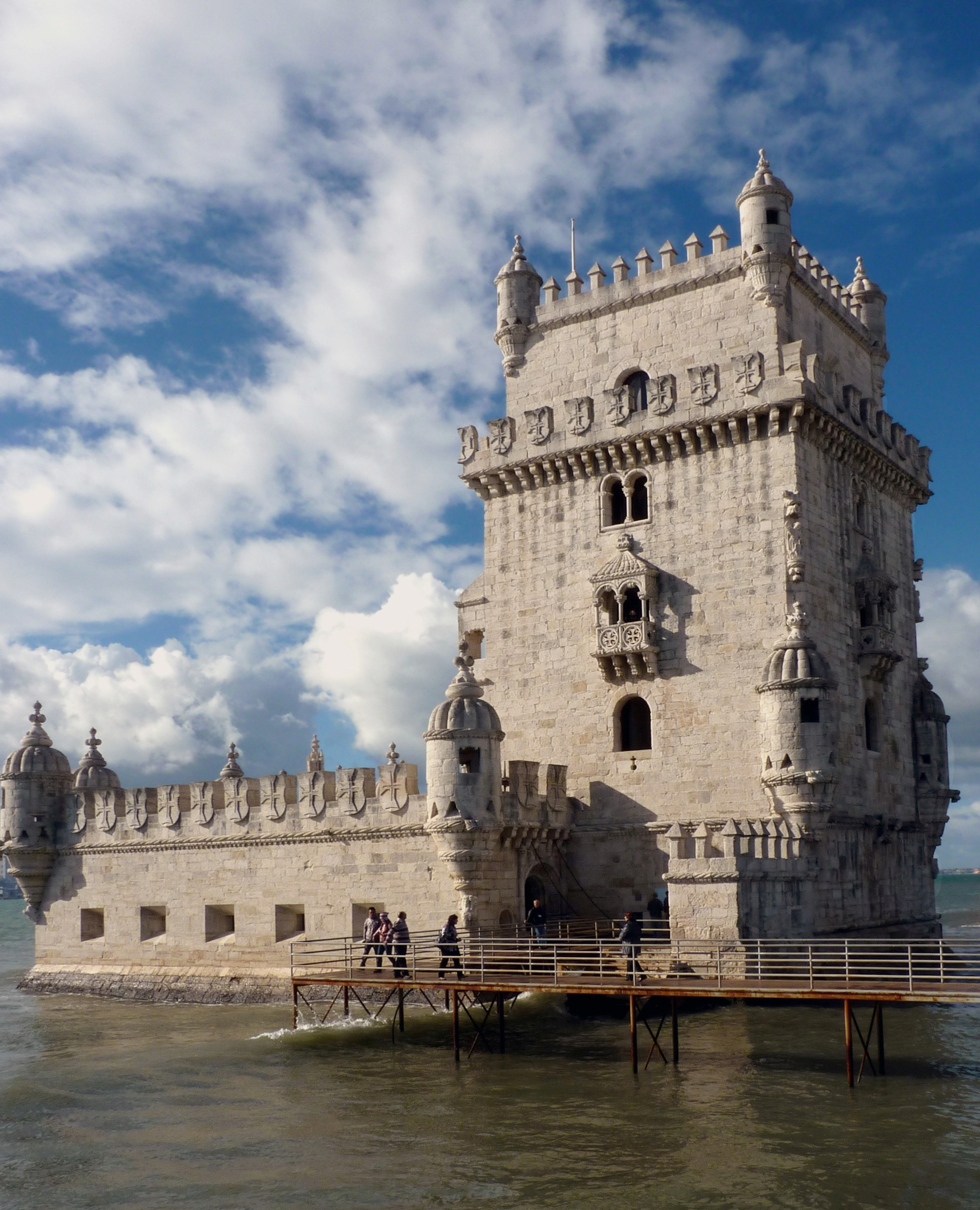
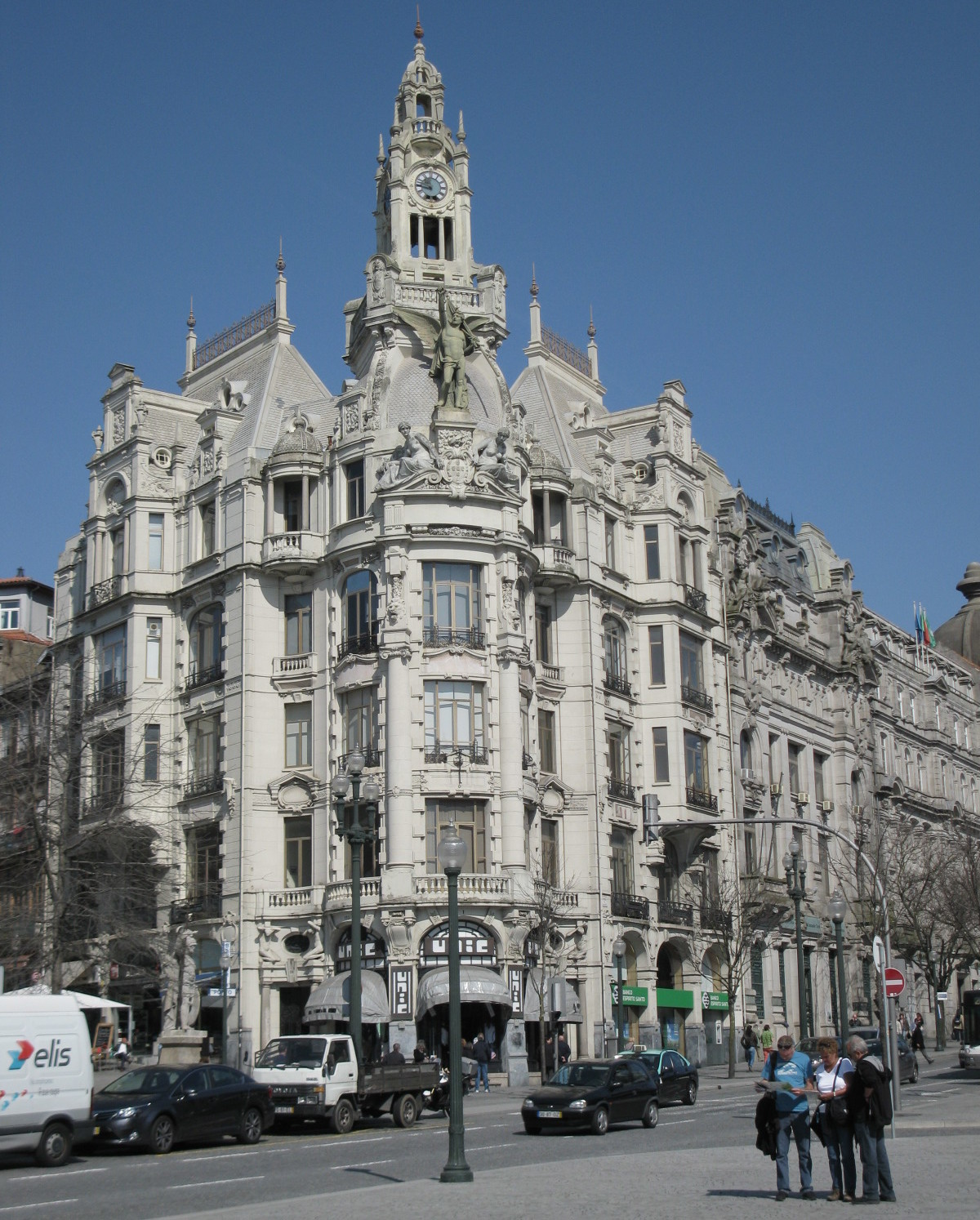
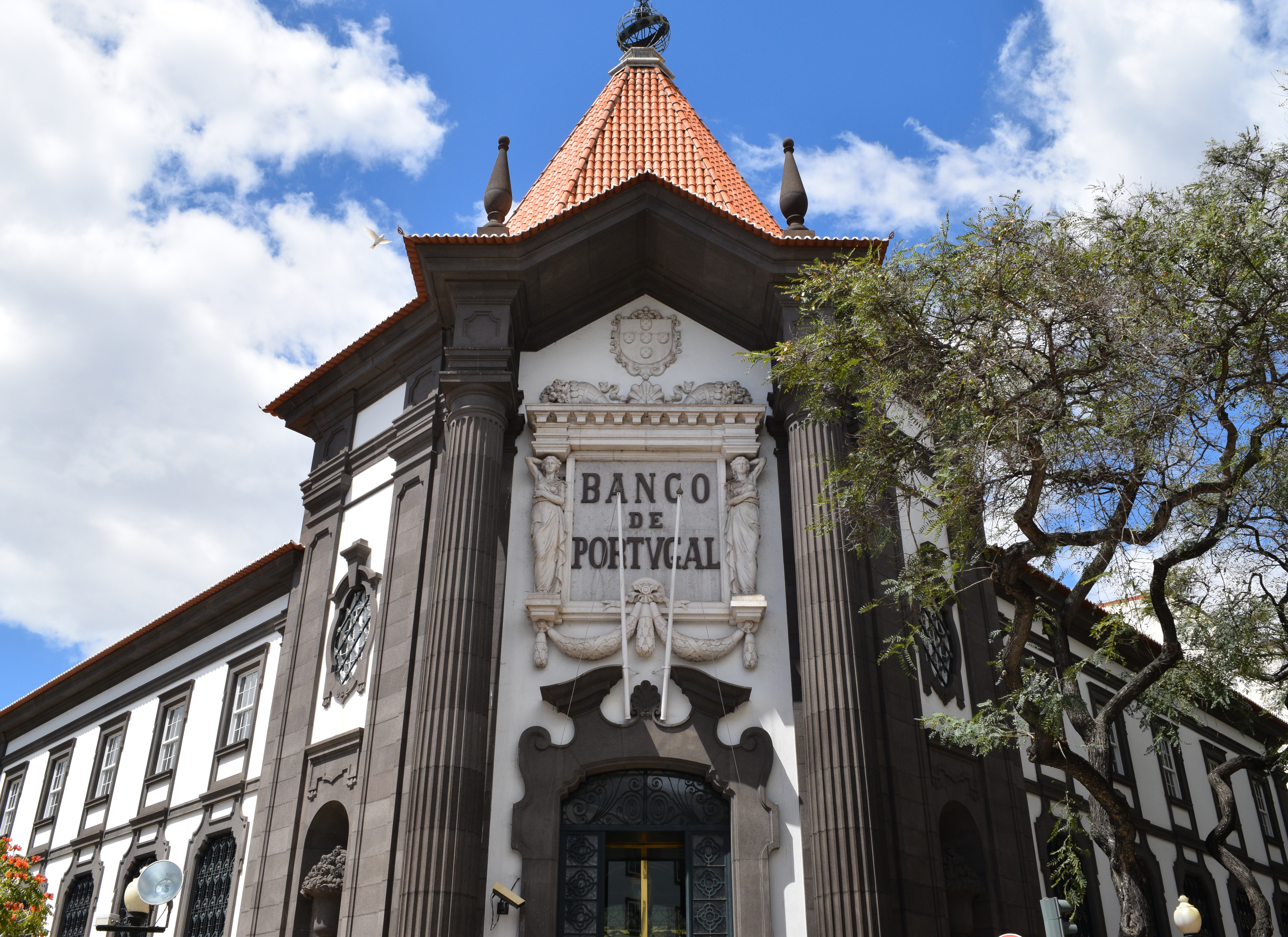
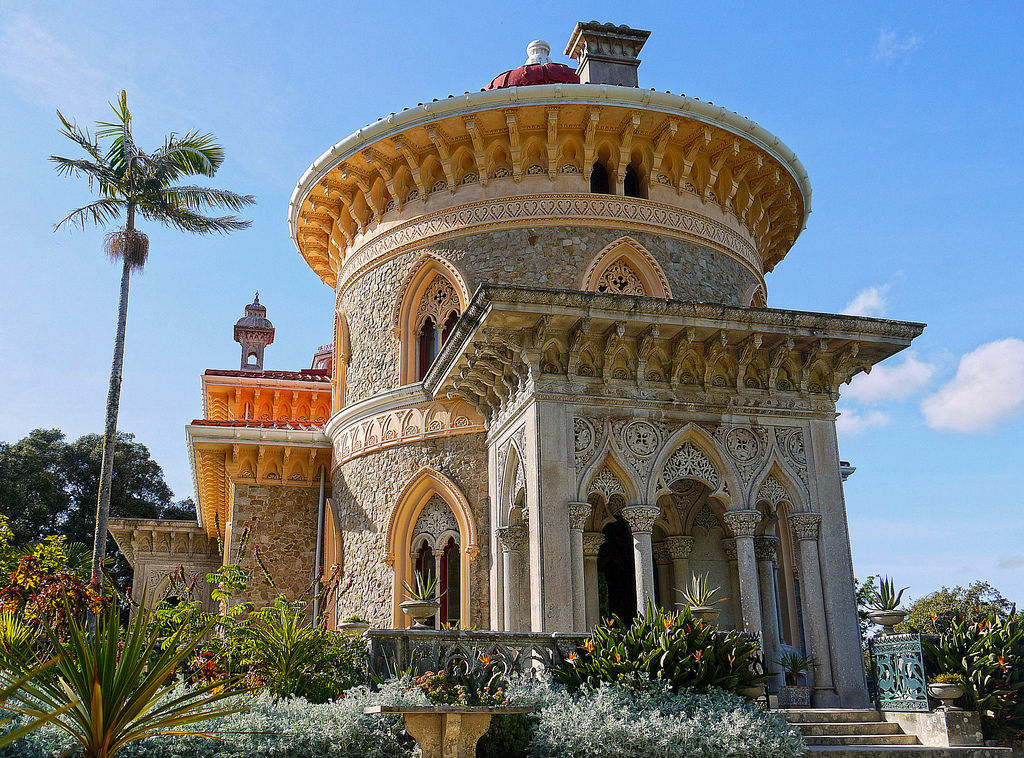
- Clockwise: Pena Palace in Sintra, Praça da Liberdade in Porto, Monserrate Palace in Sintra, MAAT Museum of Art, Architecture, and Technology in Lisbon, Banco de Portugal in Funchal, Belém Tower in Lisbon.

Portuguese architecture refers to both the architecture of Portugal's modern-day territory in Continental Portugal, the Azores and Madeira, as well as the architectural heritage/patrimony of Portuguese architects and styles throughout the world, particularly in countries formerly part of the Portuguese Empire.

Like all aspects of Portuguese culture, Portuguese architecture reflects the artistic influences of the various cultures that have either inhabited Portugal or come in contact with the Portuguese people throughout the history of Portugal, including the Gallaecians, Lusitanians, Celtiberians, Romans, Suebi, Visigoths, Moors, Goans, Macanese, Kristang people, and many more. Because of the history of the Portuguese Empire, several countries across the world are home to sizable heritages of Portuguese colonial architecture, notably Brazil and Uruguay in the Americas, Angola, Cabo Verde, São Tomé and Príncipe, Benin, Ghana, Morocco, Guinea Bissau, Zimbabwe, and Mozambique in Africa, and China, India, Indonesia, Malaysia, and Timor Leste in Asia.

Various artistic styles or movements have dominated Portuguese architecture throughout the ages, including Romanesque, Gothic, Manueline, Portuguese Renaissance, Portuguese Baroque, Rococo, Pombaline, Neo-Manueline, Soft Portuguese style, and contemporary architecture. Notable Portuguese architects of the past have included Diogo de Arruda (15–16th c.), João Antunes (17th c.), Eugénio dos Santos and Carlos Mardel (18th c.), José Luis Monteiro (19th c.), Raul Lino, Cassiano Branco and Fernando Távora (20th c.). Famous living architects include Gonçalo Byrne, Eduardo Souto de Moura (Pritzker winner), António Maria Braga, João Carrilho da Graça and Álvaro Siza Vieira (Priktzer winner).

== History ==
=== Megalithic period ===
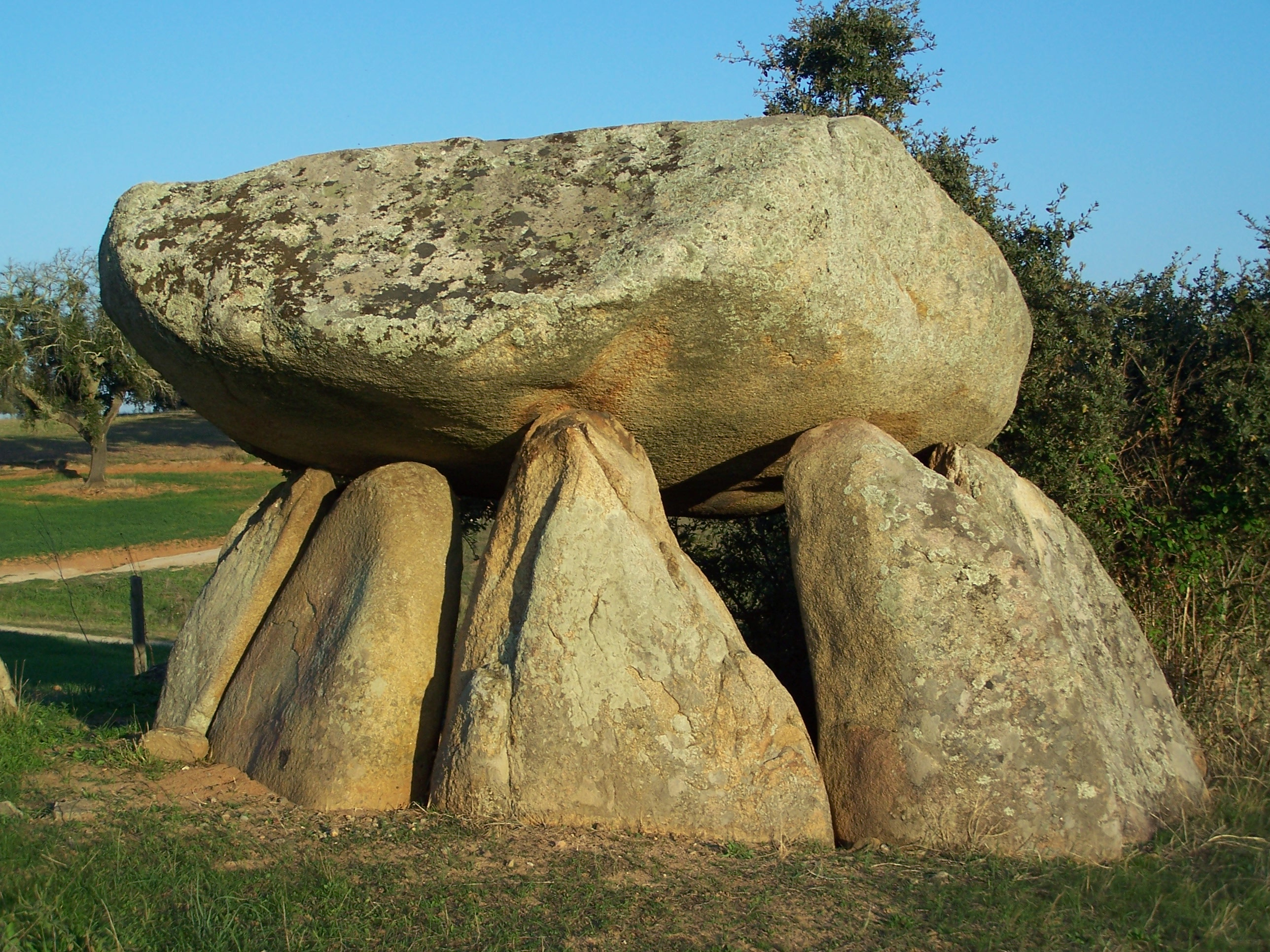
Neolithic dolmen in Alentejo

The earliest examples of architectural activity in Portugal date from the Neolithic and consist of structures associated with Megalith culture. The Portuguese hinterland is dotted with a large number of dolmens (called antas or dólmens), tumuli (mamoas) and menhirs. The Alentejo region is particularly rich in megalithic monuments, like the notable Anta Grande do Zambujeiro, located near Évora. Standing stones can be found isolated or forming circular arrays (stone circles or cromlechs). The Almendres Cromlech, also located near Évora, is the largest of the Iberian Peninsula, containing nearly 100 menhirs arranged in two elliptical arrays on an east–west orientation.

=== Celtic period ===
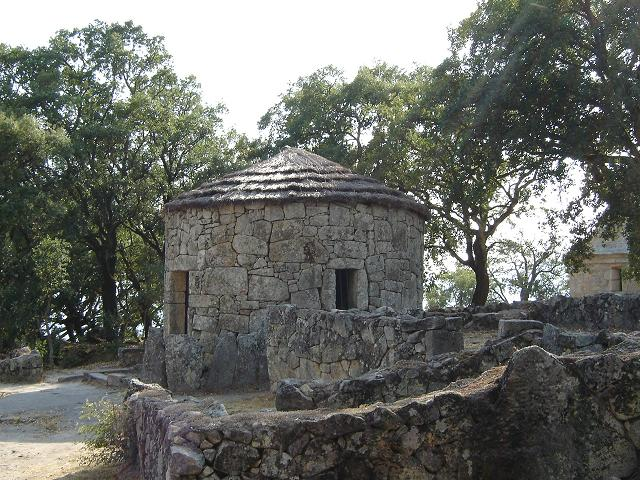
Iron Age Castro at Citânia de Briteiros in Guimarães

Celtic pre-historic fortified villages dating from the Chalcolithic are found along the Tagus river like that of Vila Nova de São Pedro, near Cartaxo, and the Castro of Zambujal, near Torres Vedras. These sites were occupied in the period around 2500–1700 BC and were surrounded by stone walls and towers, a sign of the conflicts of the time.

Starting around the 6th century BC, Northern Portugal, as well as neighbouring Galicia, saw the development of the Celtic Castro culture (cultura castreja). This region was dotted with hillfort villages (called citânias or cividades) that for the most part continued to exist under Roman domination, when the area became incorporated into the province of Gallaecia. Notable archaeological castro sites are the Citânia de Sanfins, near Paços de Ferreira, Citânia de Briteiros and Citânia de Sabroso, near Guimarães, and the Cividade de Terroso, near Póvoa do Varzim. For defensive reasons, these hillforts were built over elevated terrain and were surrounded by rings of stone walls (Terroso had three wall rings). The houses inside the castros are about 3.5 to 5 meters long, mostly circular with some rectangular, stone-made and with thatch roofs which rested on a wood column in the centre of the building. Their streets are somewhat regular, suggesting some form of central organization. Baths were built in some of them, like in Briteiros and Sanfins.

=== Roman period ===
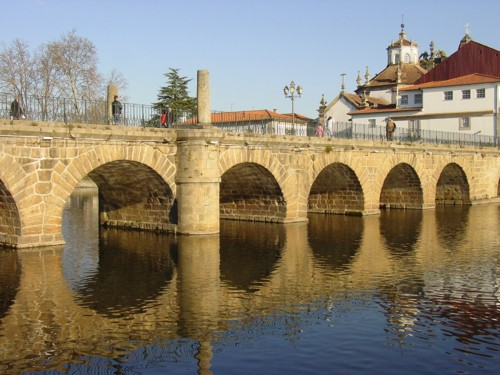
The Roman bridge of Aquae Flaviae, modern-day Chaves

Architecture developed significantly in the 2nd century BC with the arrival of the Romans, who called the Iberian Peninsula Hispania. Conquered settlements and villages were often modernised following Roman models, with the building of a forum, streets, theatres, temples, baths, aqueducts and other public buildings. An efficient array of roads and bridges was built to link the cities and other settlements.

Roman Temple of Évora, 1st century

Braga (Bracara Augusta) was the capital of the Gallaecia province and still has vestiges of public baths, a public fountain (called Idol's Fountain) and a theatre. Évora boasts a well-preserved Roman temple, probably dedicated to the cult of Emperor Augustus. A Roman bridge crosses the Tâmega River by the city of Chaves (Aquae Flaviae). Lisbon (Olissipo) has the remains of a theatre in the Alfama neighbourhood.

The best-preserved remains of a Roman village are those of Conimbriga, located near Coimbra. The excavations revealed city walls, baths, the forum, an aqueduct, an amphitheatre, and houses for the middle classes (insulae), as well as luxurious mansions (domus) with central courtyards decorated with mosaics. Another important excavated Roman village is Miróbriga, near Santiago do Cacém, with a well preserved Roman temple, baths, a bridge and the vestiges of the only Roman hippodrome known in Portugal.

In the hinterland, wealthy Romans established villae, country houses dedicated to agriculture. Many villae contained facilities likes baths and were decorated with mosaics and paintings. Important sites are the Villae of Pisões (near Beja), Torre de Palma (near Monforte) and Centum Cellas (near Belmonte). The latter has the well-preserved ruins of a three-storey tower which was part of the residence of the villa owner.

=== Pre-Romanesque and Visigoth period ===
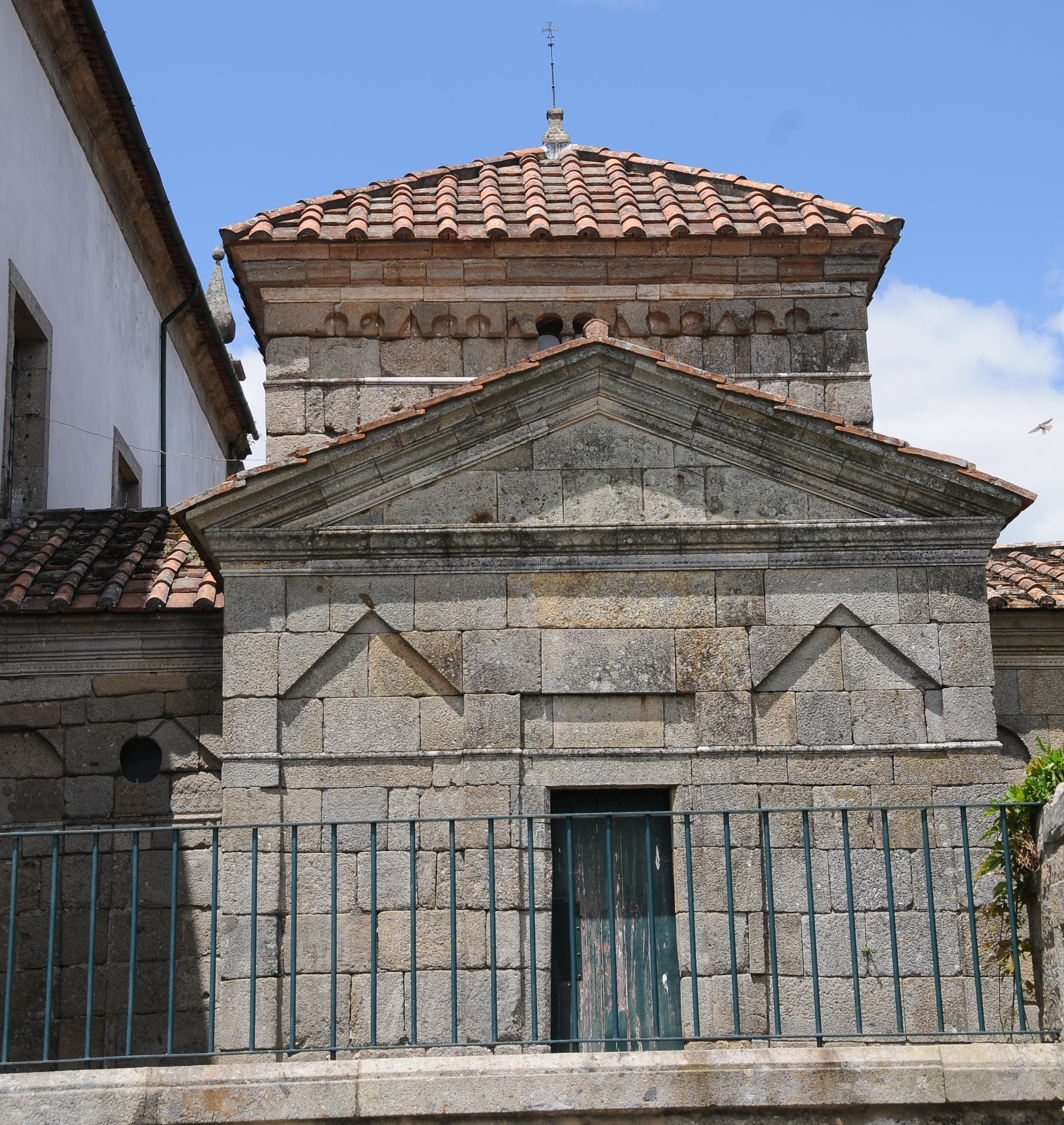
São Frutuoso Chapel, Braga 7th century

Roman domination in Hispania was ended with the invasions by Germanic peoples (especially Sueves and Visigoths) starting in the 5th century AD. Very few buildings survive from the period of Visigoth domination (c. 580–770), most of them modified in subsequent centuries. One of these is the small Saint Frutuoso Chapel, near Braga, which was part of a Visigothic monastery built in the 7th century. The building has a Greek cross floorplan with rectangular arms and a central cupola; both the cupola and the arms of the chapel are decorated with arch reliefs. The chapel shows clear influences of Byzantine buildings like the Mausoleum of Galla Placidia in Ravenna.

After 711, in the period of dominance of the Iberian Peninsula by the Moors, the Christian Kingdom of Asturias (c.711–910), located in the Northern part of the peninsula, was a centre of resistance (see Reconquista). In addition, many Christians (Mozarabs) lived in Moorish territories and were allowed to practice their religion and build churches. Asturian architecture and Mozarabic art influenced Christian buildings in the future Portuguese territory, as seen on the few structures that survived from this period. The most important of these is the Church of São Pedro de Lourosa, located near Oliveira do Hospital, which bears an inscription that gives 912 as the year of its construction. The church is a basilica with three aisles separated by horseshoe arches, a narthex on the façade and mullioned, horseshoe-shaped windows of Asturian influence on the central aisle.

Other pre-Romanesque churches broadly attributed to a mixture of Asturian and Mozarabic features are São Pedro de Balsemão, near Lamego, with a basilica floorplan, and the Chapel of São Gião, near Nazaré, all of which are disputed by some authors as buildings of Visigoth origin, having had additional features incorporated at a later stage. The inner spaces of these buildings are all divided by typical horseshoe arches. The Visigothic Saint Frutuoso Chapel was also modified in the 10th century, when the arm chapels were given a round floorplan and horseshoe arches.

=== Moorish period ===
The invasion of the Iberian Peninsula in the year 711 by Moors from the Maghreb put an end to Visigoth rule in Hispania, called Al-Andalus by the newcomers. Moorish presence influenced art and architecture, especially in Southern Portugal, where the Reconquista was completed in 1249. Buildings during that period were often constructed with rammed earth (taipa) and adobe techniques, followed by whitewashing. Traditional houses in cities and villages in Portugal may have simple, white façades evoking Islamic influence. Some Southern neighbourhoods like the old Alfama district in Lisbon, have retained the street layouts from Muslim times. Contrasting with neighbouring Spain however, very few Islamic buildings in Portugal have survived intact to this day.

Castles

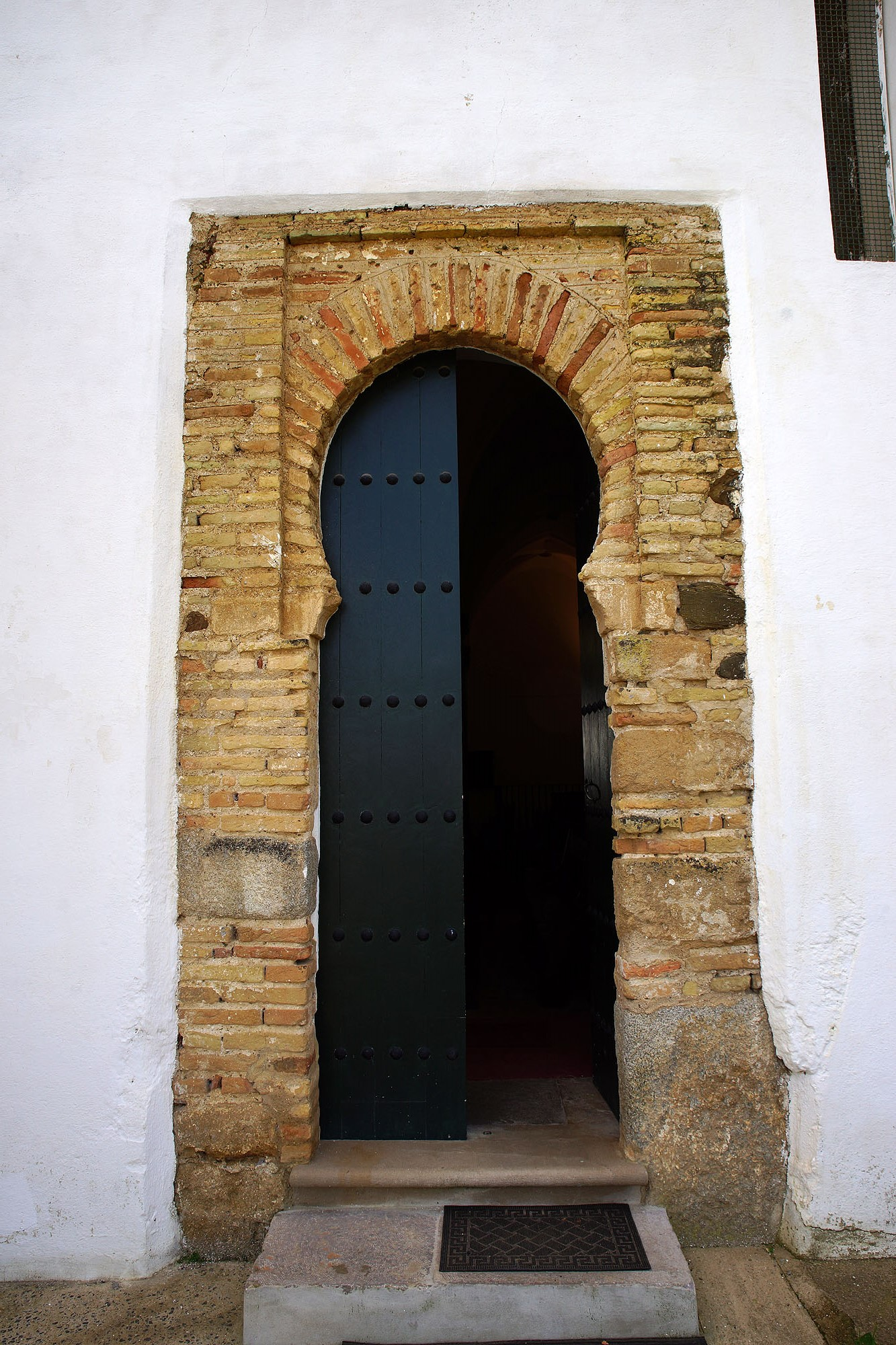
Moorish arch in Mértola

Although many originated during the Islamic period, most Portuguese castles were extensively remodelled after the Christian reconquest.

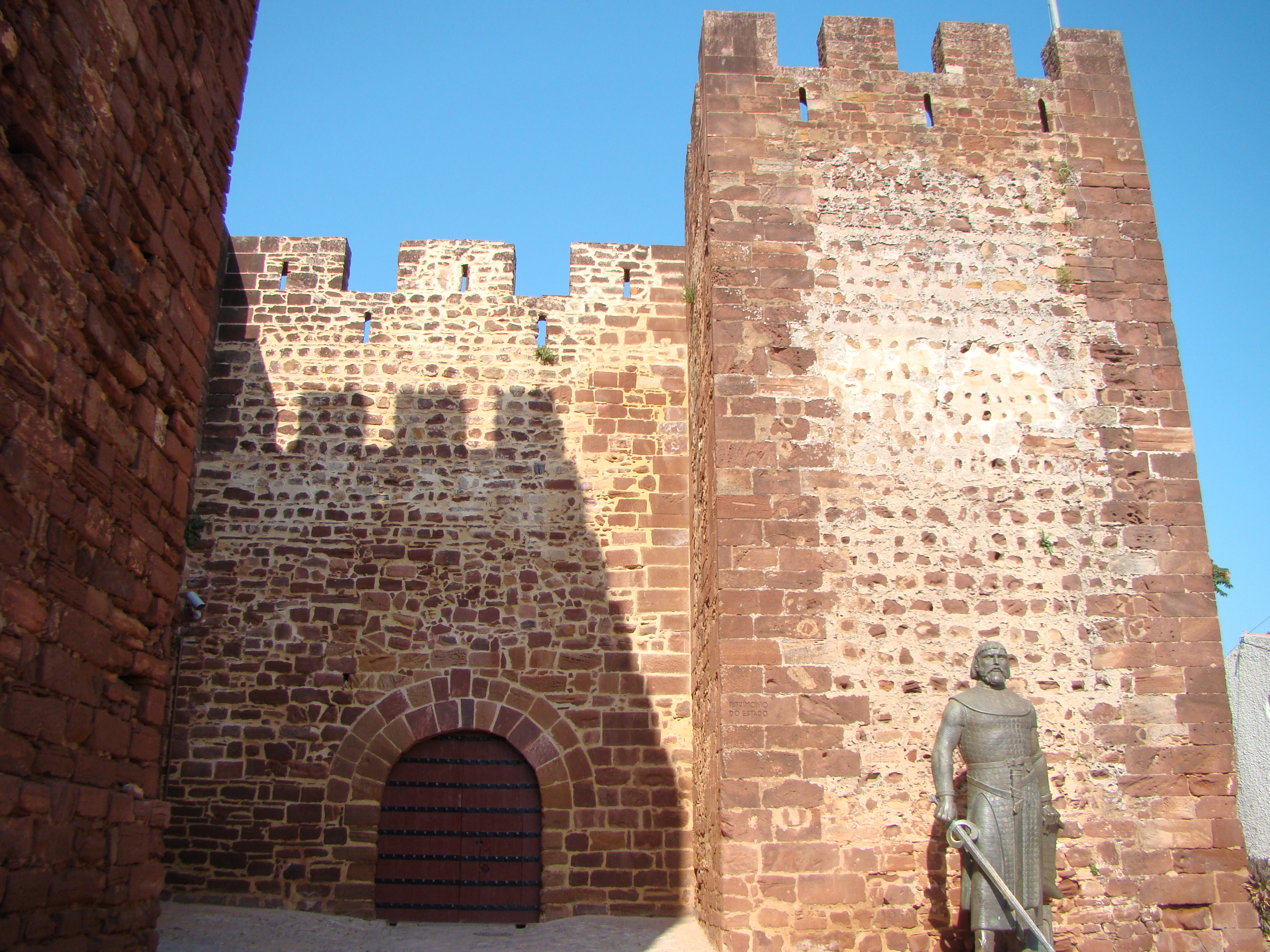
Silves Castle in the Algarve, 8th century

The best-preserved is Silves Castle, located in Silves, the ancient capital of the Al-Garb, today's Algarve. Built between the 8th and 13th centuries, Silves Castle has preserved its walls and square-shaped towers from the Moorish period, as well as 11th-century cisterns – water reservoirs used in case of a siege. The old centre of the city – the Almedina – was defended by a wall and several fortified towers and gates, parts of which were preserved.

Another notable Islamic castle in the Algarve is Paderne Castle, whose ruined walls evidence the taipa building technique used in its construction. The Sintra Moorish Castle near Lisbon, has also kept some remains of walls and a cistern from that time. Part of the Moorish city walls have been preserved in Lisbon (the so-called Cerca Velha) and Évora, and Moorish city gates with a characteristic horseshoe-arched profile can be found in Faro and Elvas.

Mosques

Many mosques were built in Portuguese territory during Muslim domination, but virtually all were either destroyed or altered and turned into churches and cathedrals. The only clear example of a former mosque in Portugal is present-day Mértola's Main Church, initially Mértola Mosque built in the 12th century. Once the village was reconquered, the mosque was partially altered and converted into a church. Its interior has a nearly square-shaped floorplan with 4 aisles, and a total of 12 columns supporting a subsequent 16th-century Manueline rib vaulting, modifications to the roof, and removal of aisles added Christian architectural features to the structure. Despite the changes, the original labyrinthic interior with its "forest" of pillars, three horseshoe arches with an alfiz the inner wall with a decorated niche, a mihrab pointing to Mecca, all show the same contemporary Islamic features found in Spain and the Maghreb.

=== Portuguese Romanesque style ===
The Patriarchal Cathedral of Lisbon began construction in 1147

The Romanesque style was introduced in Portugal between the end of the 11th and the beginning of the 12th century. The most influential of the first Portuguese Romanesque monuments were Braga Cathedral and the Monastery of Rates. The Cathedral of Braga was rebuilt in the 1070s by bishop Pedro and consecrated in 1089, although only the apse was finished at the time. The bishop's ambitious plan was to create a pilgrimage church, with a three aisled nave, an ambulatory and a large transept. A relic of this early project may be a small Eastern chapel located nowadays outside the church itself.

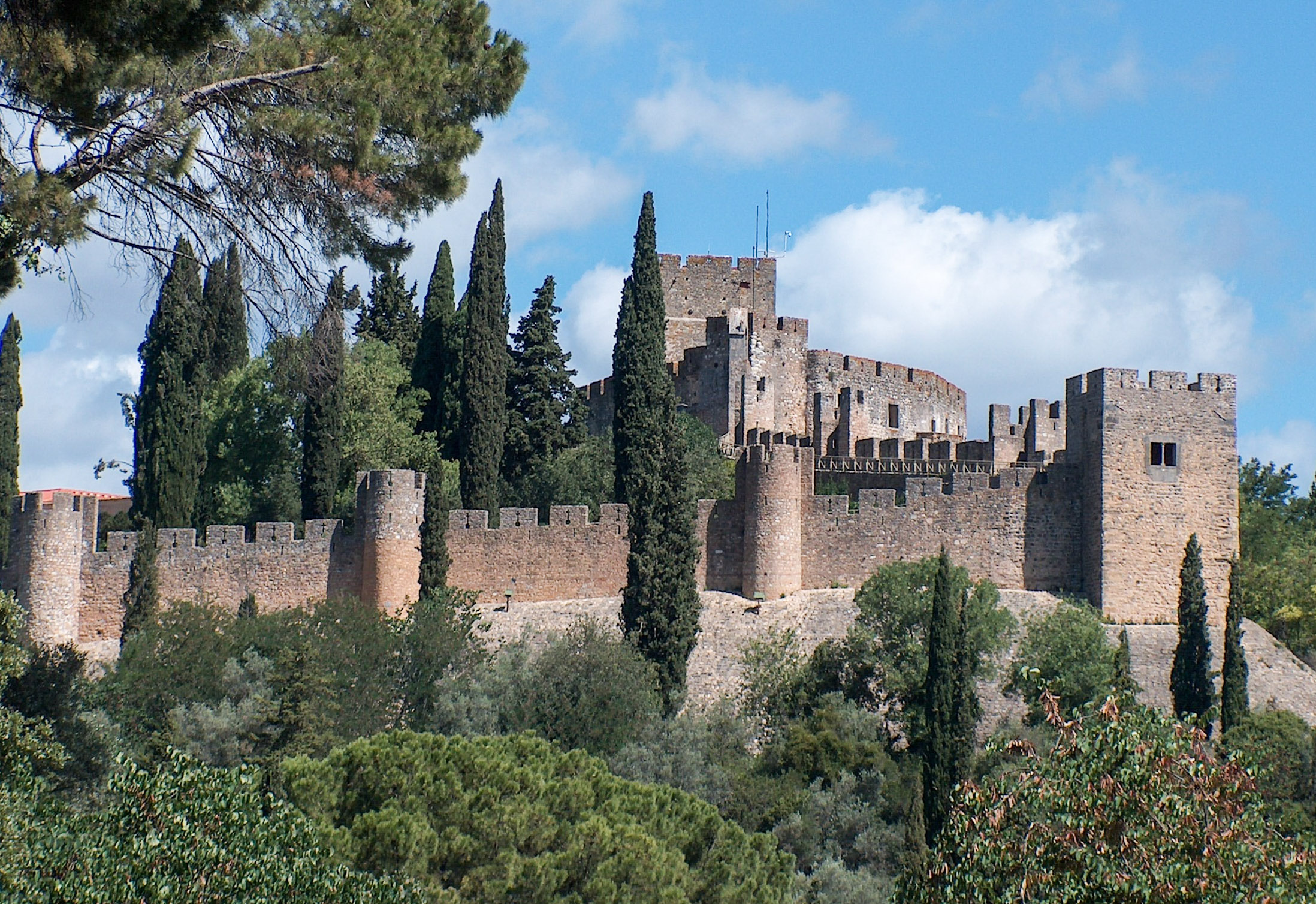
The charola (top) and castle (bottom) of the Convent of Christ in Tomar

Building activity gained pace after 1095, when Count Henry took possession of the Condado Portucalense. Count Henry came to Portugal with a number of noblemen and also Benedictine monks of Cluny Abbey, which was headed by Henry's brother, Hugh. The Benedictines and other religious orders gave great impulse to Romanesque architecture during the whole 12th century. Count Henry sponsored the building of the Monastery of Rates (begun in 1096), one of the fundamental works of the first Portuguese Romanesque, although the project was modified several times during the 12th century. The relevance of its architecture and sculptures with diverse architectural influences make this temple a case study that is reflected in the production of further Romanesque art of the nascent kingdom of Portugal.

The worships of Braga and Rates were very influential in Northern Portugal. Extant 12th-century Romanesque monastic churches are found in Manhente (near Barcelos), with a portal dating from around 1117; Rio Mau (near Vila do Conde); with an exceptional apse dating from 1151; Travanca (near Amarante); Paço de Sousa (near Penafiel); Bravães (near Ponte da Barca), Pombeiro (near Felgueiras) and many others.

The spread of Romanesque in Portugal followed the north–south path of the Reconquista, specially during the reign of Afonso Henriques, Count Henry's son and first King of Portugal. In Coimbra, Afonso Henriques created the Santa Cruz Monastery, one of the most important of the monastic foundations of the time, although the current building is the result of a 16th-century remodelling. Afonso Henriques and his successors also sponsored the building of many cathedrals in the bishop seats of the country. This generation of Romanesque cathedrals included the already-mentioned Braga, Porto, Coimbra, Viseu, Lamego and Lisbon.

All Portuguese Romanesque cathedrals were later extensively modified with the exception of the Cathedral of Coimbra (begun 1162), which has remained unaltered. Coimbra Cathedral is a Latin cross church with a three-aisled nave, a transept with short arms and three East chapels. The central aisle is covered by a stone barrel vaulting while the lateral aisles are covered by groin vaults. The second storey of the central aisle has an arched gallery (triforium), and the crossing is topped by a dome. This general scheme is related to that of the Cathedral of Santiago de Compostela in Galicia, although the Coimbra building is much less ambitious.

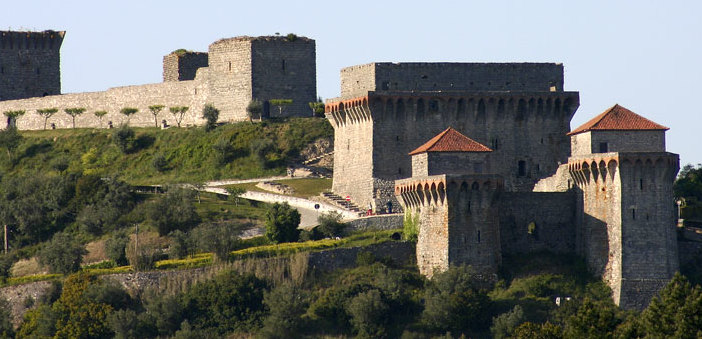
Castle of the Counts of Ourém was built between the 12-15th centuries.

The fortress-like Old Cathedral of Coimbra began construction in 1139

Lisbon Cathedral (begun c. 1147) is very similar to Coimbra Cathedral, except that the West façade is flanked by two massive towers, a feature observed in other cathedrals like Porto and Viseu. In general, Portuguese cathedrals had a heavy, fortress-like appearance, with crenellations and little decoration apart from portals and windows.

A remarkable religious Romanesque building is the Round Church (Rotunda) in the Castle of Tomar, which was built in the second half of the 12th century by the Templar Knights. The church is a round structure with a central arched octagon, and was probably modelled after the Dome of the Rock in Jerusalem, which was mistakenly believed by the crusaders to be a remnant of the Temple of Solomon. The Church of the Holy Sepulchre of Jerusalem may also have served as model.

Castles

The troubled times of the Portuguese Reconquista meant that many castles had to be built to protect villages from Moor and Castilian attacks. King Afonso Henriques sponsored the building of many fortifications (often transforming Moorish castles such as Lisbon Castle) and granted land to Military Orders – specially the Templar Knights and the Knights Hospitallers – who became responsible for the defence of borders and villages. The Templar Knights built several fortresses along the line of the Tagus river, like the castles of Pombal, Tomar and Belver and Almourol. They are credited as having introduced the keep to Portuguese military architecture.

=== Gothic period ===
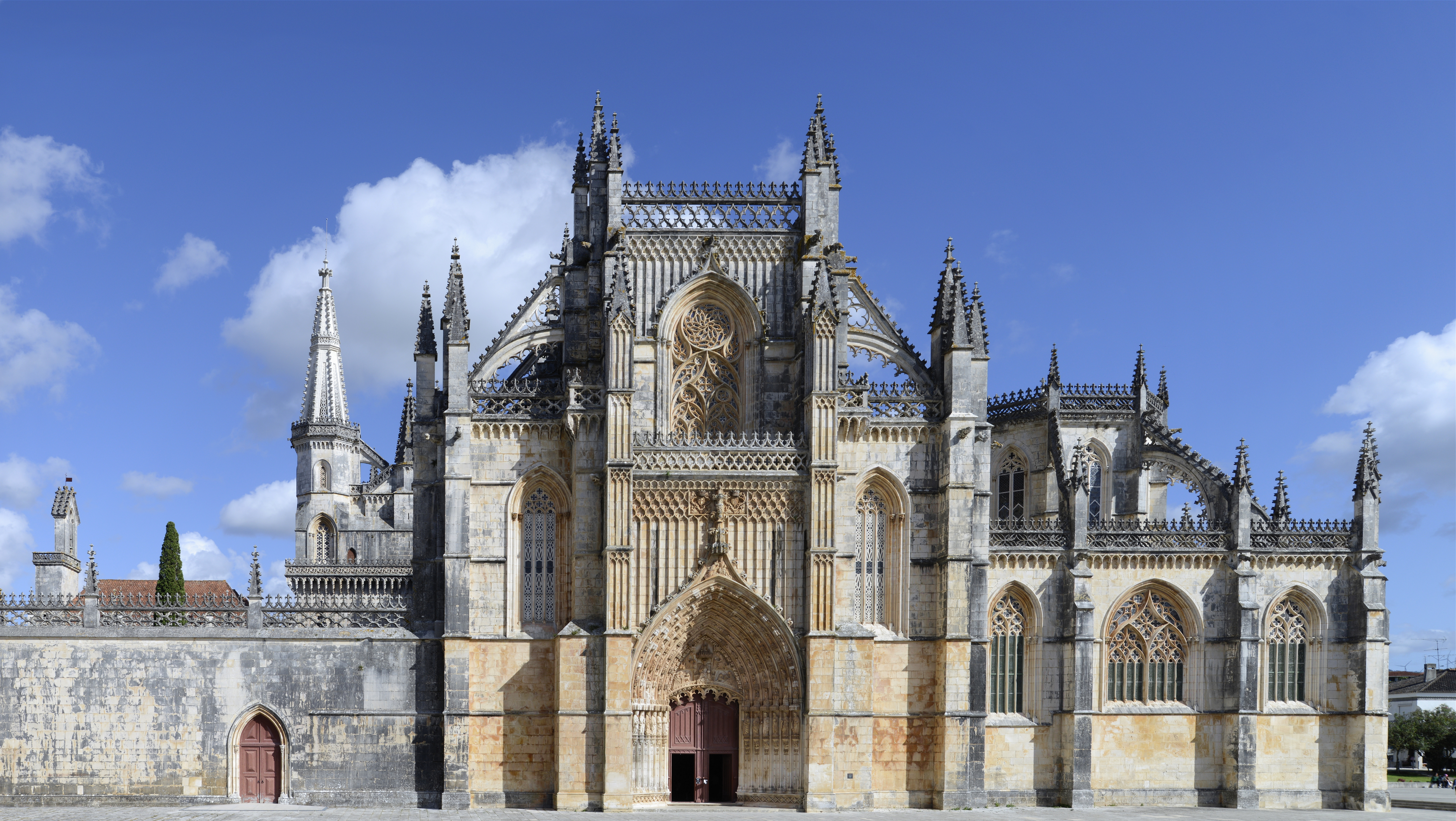
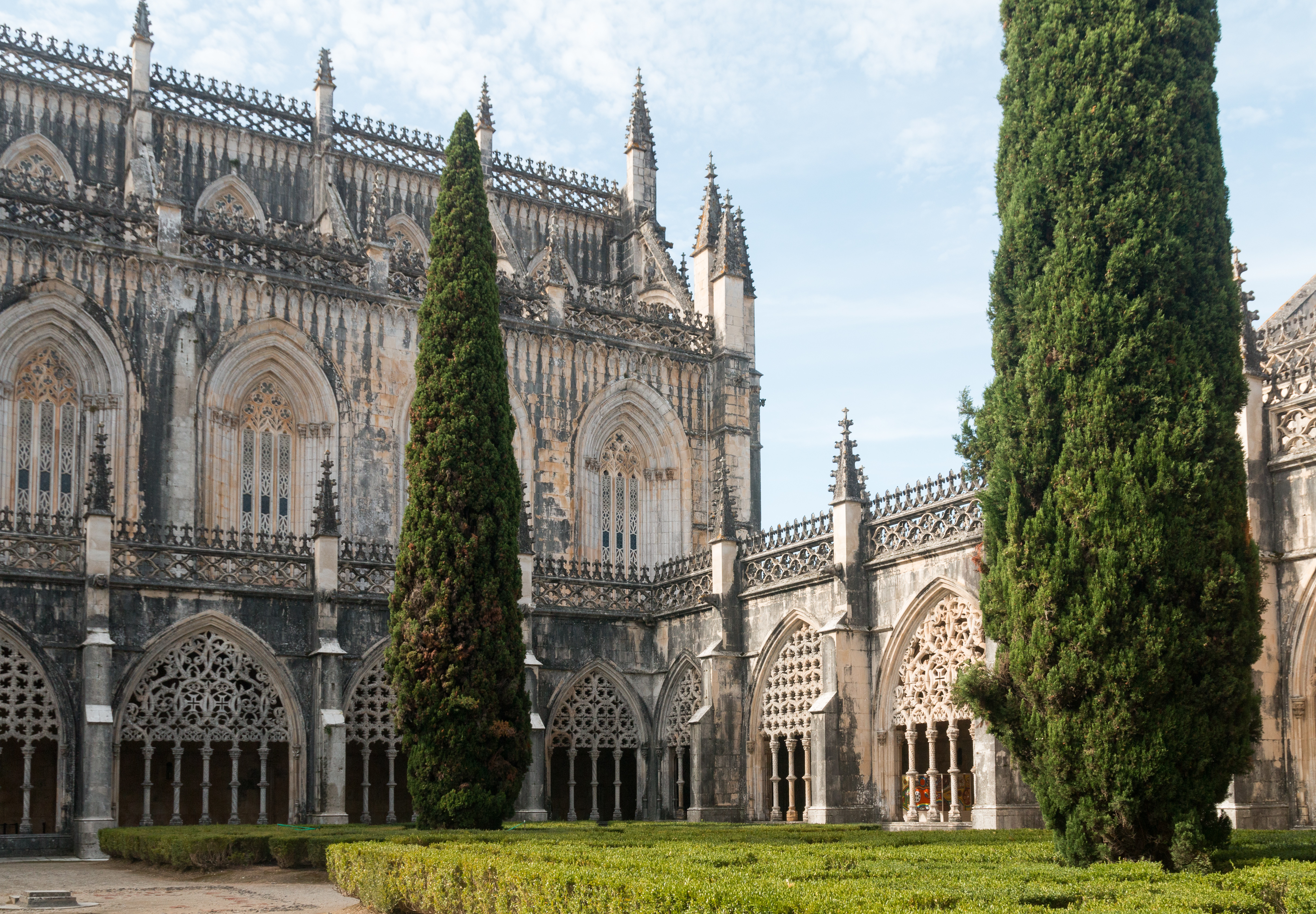
Batalha Monastery, built by John I of Portugal to commemorate the end of the 1383–1385 Portuguese interregnum

Gothic architecture was brought to Portugal by the Cistercian Order. The first fully Gothic building in Portugal is the church of the Monastery of Alcobaça, a magnificent example of the clear and simple architectural forms favoured by the Cistercians. The church was built between 1178 and 1252 in three phases, and seems inspired by the Abbey of Clairvaux, in the Champagne. Its three aisles are very tall and slender, giving an exceptional impression of height. The whole church is covered by rib vaulting and the main chapel has an ambulatory and a series of radiant chapels. The vault of the ambulatory is externally supported by flying buttresses, typical features of Gothic architecture and a novelty at the time in Portugal.

After the foundation of Alcobaça, the Gothic style was chiefly disseminated by mendicant orders (mainly Franciscan, Augustinians and Dominicans). Along the 13th and 14th centuries, several convents were founded in urban centres, important examples of which can be found in Porto (São Francisco Church), Coimbra (Monastery of Santa Clara-a-Velha), Guimarães (São Francisco, São Domingos), Santarém (São Francisco, Santa Clara), Elvas (São Domingos), Lisbon (ruins of Carmo Convent) and many other places. Mendicant Gothic churches usually had a three-aisled nave covered with wooden roof and an apse with three chapels covered with rib vaulting. These churches also lacked towers and were mostly devoid of architectural decoration, in tone with mendicant ideals. Mendicant Gothic was also adopted in several parish churches built all over the country, for instance in Sintra (Santa Maria), Mafra, Lourinhã and Loulé.

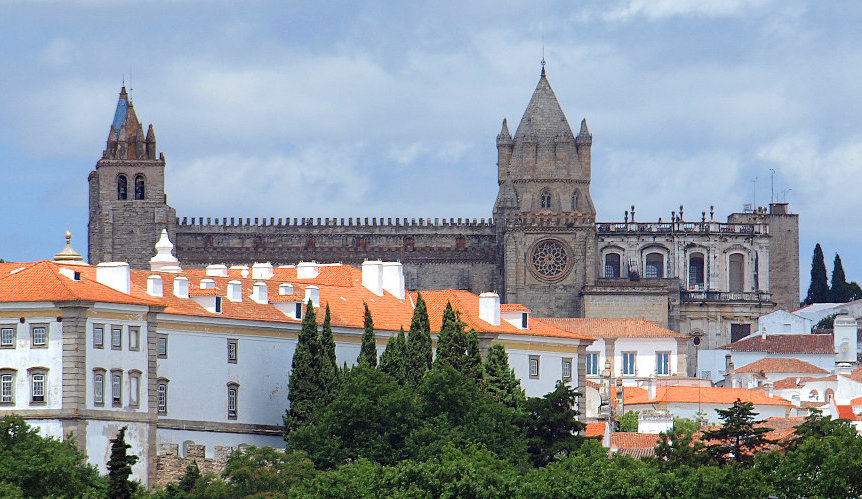
Évora Cathedral, in the Alentejo, largely built from 1184 to 1380

Many of the Romanesque cathedrals were modernised with Gothic elements. Thus, the Romanesque nave of Porto Cathedral is supported by flying buttresses, one of the first built in Portugal (early 13th century). The apse of Lisbon Cathedral was totally remodelled in the first half of the 14th century, when it gained a Gothic ambulatory illuminated by a clerestory (high row of windows on the upper storey). The ambulatory has a series of radiant chapels illuminated with large windows, contrasting with the dark Romanesque nave of the cathedral.

An important transitional building is Évora Cathedral, built during the 13th century; even though its floorplan, façade and elevation are inspired by Lisbon Cathedral, its forms (arches, windows, vaults) are already Gothic. Many Gothic churches maintained the fortress-like appearance of Romanesque times, like the already-mentioned Évora Cathedral, the Church of the Monastery of Leça do Balio (14th century) near Matosinhos, and even as late as the 15th-century, with the Main Church of Viana do Castelo.

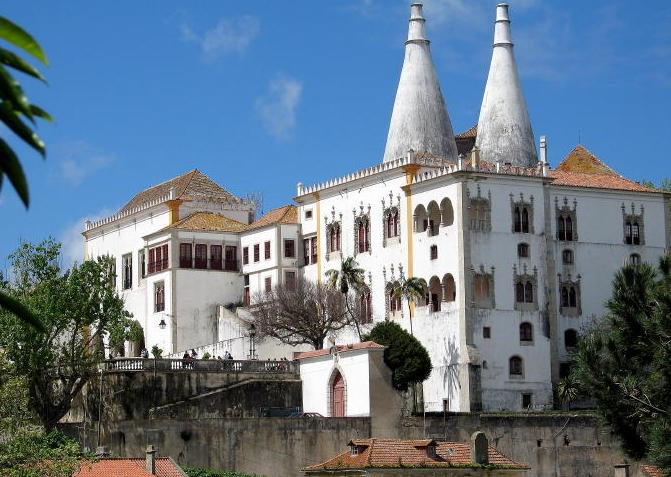
Sintra National Palace, largely built 12th-15th c., is a blend of Gothic, Manueline, and Mudéjar styles.

Several Gothic cloisters were built and can still be found in the Cathedrals of Porto, Lisbon and Évora (all from the 14th century) as well as in monasteries like Alcobaça, Santo Tirso and the Convent of the Order of Christ.

In the early 15th century, the building of the Monastery of Batalha, sponsored by King John I, led to a renovation of Portuguese Gothic. After 1402, the works were trusted to Master Huguet, of unknown origin, who introduced the Flamboyant Gothic style to the project. The whole building is decorated with Gothic pinnacles (crockets), reliefs, large windows with intrincate tracery and elaborate crenellations. The main portal has a series of archivolts decorated with a multitude of statues, while the tympanum has a relief showing Christ and the Evangelists. The Founder's Chapel and the Chapter House have elaborate star-ribbed vaulting, unknown in Portugal until then. Batalha influenced 15th-century workshops like those of Guarda Cathedral, Silves Cathedral and monasteries in Beja (Nossa Senhora da Conceição) and Santarém (Convento da Graça).

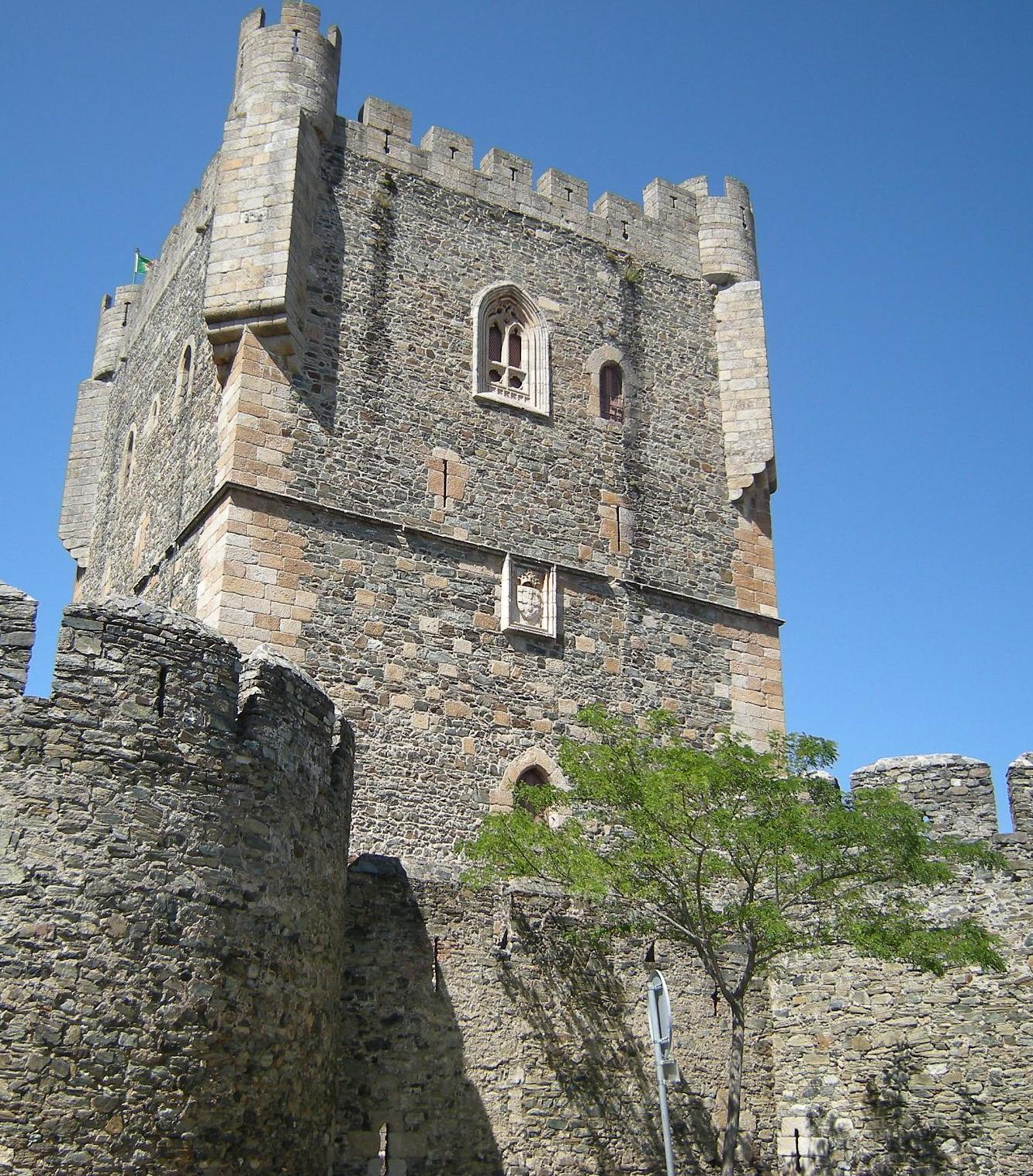
The keep of Bragança Castle, in Trás-os-Montes, was built in the 15th century.

Another Gothic variant was the so-called Mudéjar-Gothic, a fashion which developed in Portugal towards the end of the 15th century, particularly in the southern region of Alentejo. The name Mudéjar refers to the influence of Islamic art in the Christian kingdoms of the Iberian Peninsula, specially in the Middle Ages. In the Alentejo, Mudéjar influence in several buildings is evident in the profile of windows and portals, often with horseshoe arches and a mullion, circular turrets with conical pinnacles, Islamic merlons etc., as well as tile (azulejo) decoration. Examples include the portico of St Francis Church of Évora, the courtyard of the Sintra Royal Palace and several churches and palaces in Évora, Elvas, Arraiolos, Beja, etc. Múdejar eventually gave in to the Manueline style in the early 16th century.

Castles & palaces

During the Gothic era, several castles had to be either built or reinforced, especially along the border with the Kingdom of Castille. Compared to previous castles, Gothic castles in Portugal tended to have more towers, often of circular or semi-circular plan (to increase resistance to projectiles), keep towers tended to be polygonal, and castle gates were often defended by a pair of flanking towers. A second, lower wall curtain (barbicans) were often built along the perimeter of the main walls to prevent war machines from approaching the castle. Features like machicolations and improved arrowslits became also widespread.

Starting in the 14th century, keep towers became larger and more sophisticated, with rib vaulting roofs and facilities like fireplaces. Keep towers with improved residential characteristics can be found in the castles of Beja, Estremoz and Bragança, while some later castles (15th century) became real palaces, like those in Penedono, Ourém and Porto de Mós. The most significant case is the Castle of Leiria, turned into a royal palace by King John I. Some rooms of the palace are decorated with splendid Gothic loggias, from which the surrounding landscape could be appreciated by the King and Queen.

=== Manueline style ===
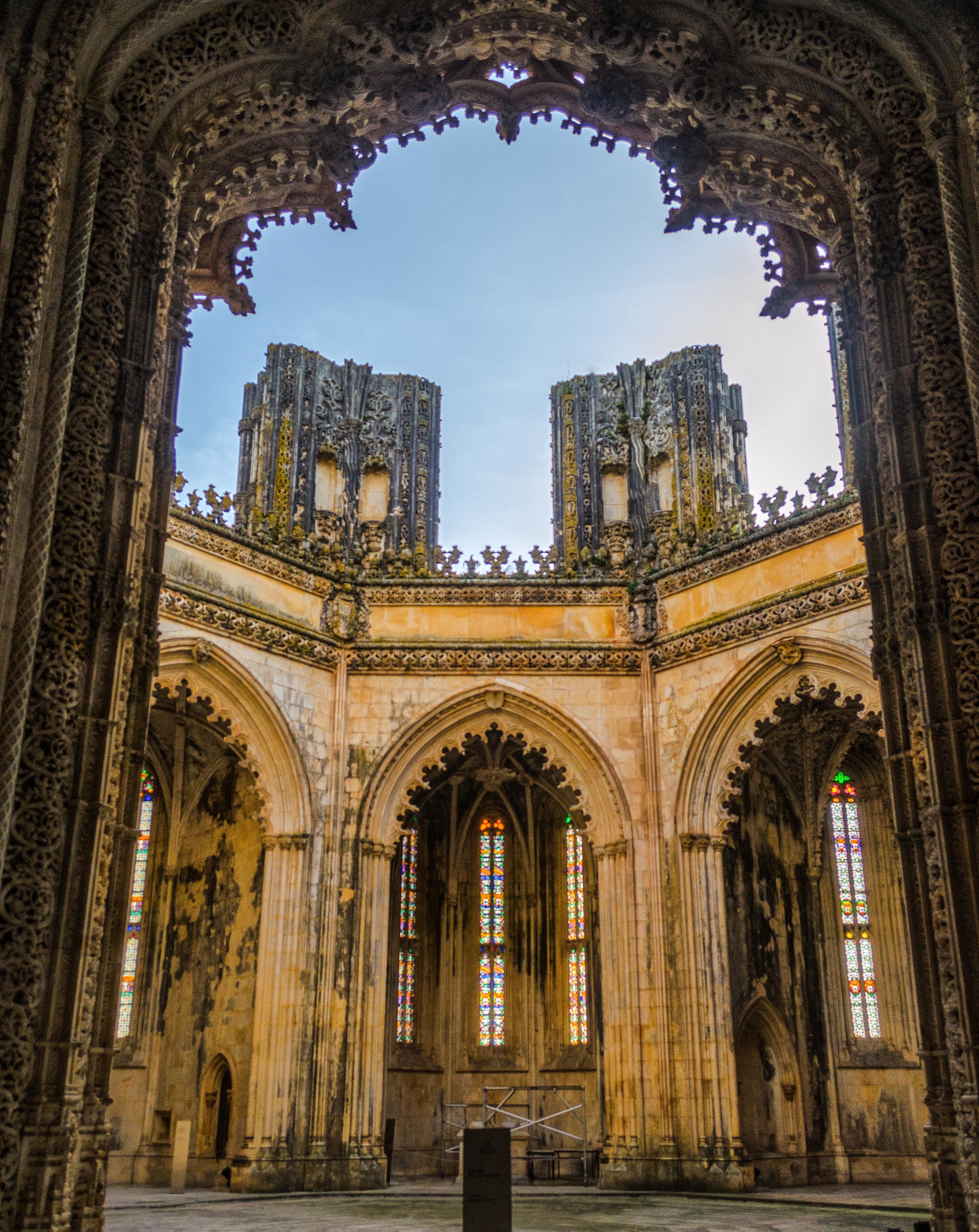
The "Imperfect Chapels" of Batalha Monastery, designed by Mateus Fernandes, 1490

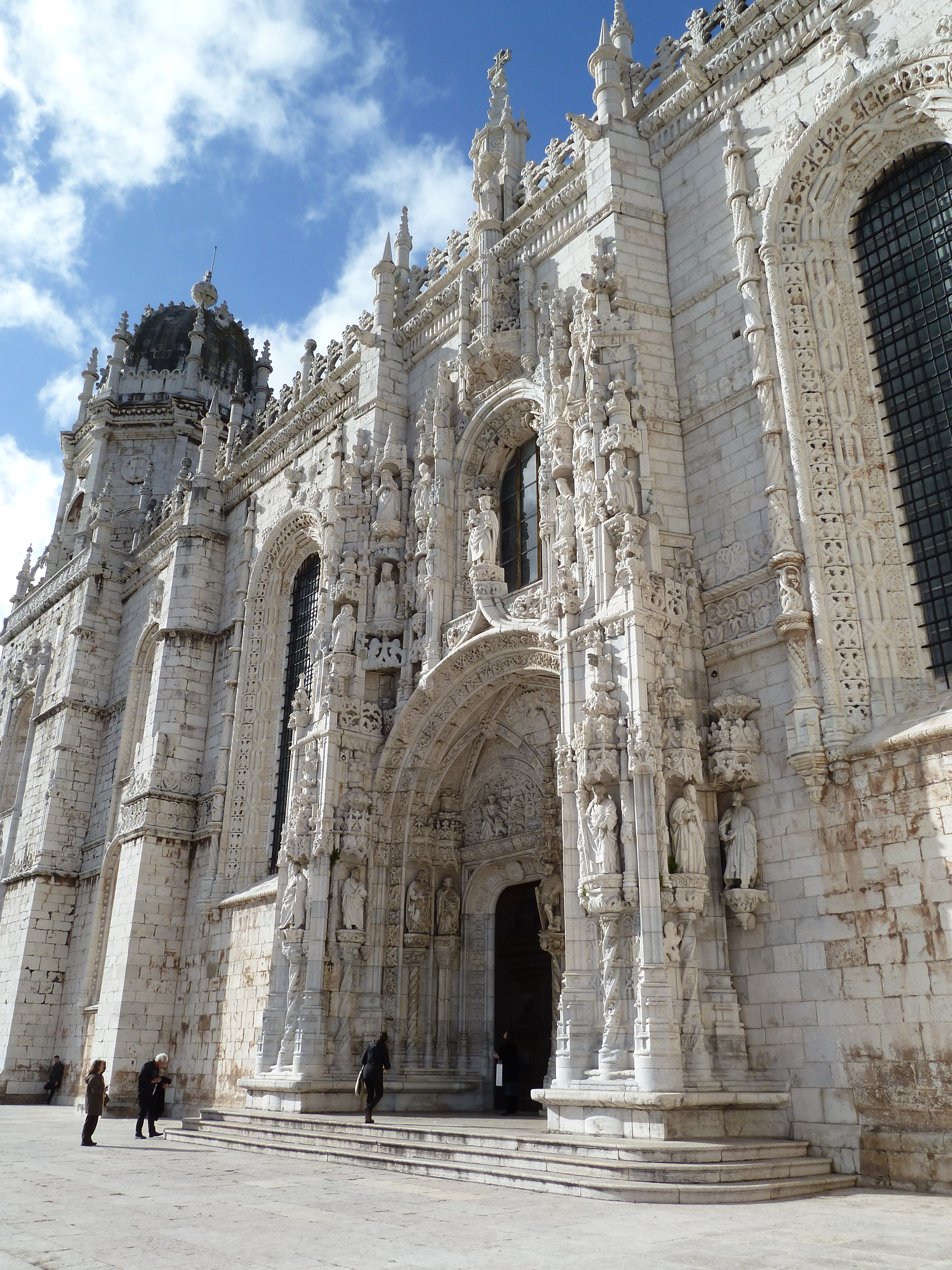
South portal of Jerónimos Monastery, designed by João de Castilho, 1517

The Manueline style, or Portuguese late Gothic, is the flamboyant, composite Portuguese style of architectural ornamentation of the first decades of the 16th century, incorporating maritime elements and representations of the discoveries brought from the voyages of Vasco da Gama and Pedro Álvares Cabral. This innovative style synthesizes aspects of Late Gothic architecture with influences of the Spanish Plateresque style, Mudéjar, Italian urban architecture, and Flemish elements. It marks the transition from Late Gothic to Renaissance architecture. The construction of churches and monasteries in Manueline, especially in Lioz, or royal stone, was largely financed by proceeds of the lucrative spice trade with Africa and India.

Although the period of this style did not last long (from 1490 to 1520), it played an important part in the development of Portuguese art. The influence of the style outlived the king. Celebrating the newly maritime power, it manifested itself in architecture (churches, monasteries, palaces, castles) and extended into other arts such as sculpture, painting, works of art made of precious metals, faience and furniture.

The first known building in Manueline style is the Monastery of Jesus of Setúbal. The church of the monastery was built from 1490 to 1510 by Diogo Boitac, an architect considered one of the main creators of the style. The nave of the church has three aisles of equal height, revealing an attempt to unify inner space which reaches its climax in the nave of the church of the Jerónimos Monastery in Lisbon, finished in the 1520s by architect João de Castilho.

The nave of the Setúbal Monastery is supported by spiralling columns, a typical Manueline feature that is also found in the nave of Guarda Cathedral and the parish churches of Olivenza, Freixo de Espada à Cinta, Montemor-o-Velho and others. Manueline buildings also usually carry elaborate portals with spiralling columns, niches and loaded with Renaissance and Gothic decorative motifs, like in Jerónimos Monastery, Santa Cruz Monastery of Coimbra and many others.

=== Portuguese Renaissance ===
The adoption of the austere Renaissance style did not catch on well in Portugal. Introduced by a French architect in 1517, it was mainly practiced from the 1530s on by foreign architects and was therefore called estrangeirada (foreign-influenced). In later years this style slowly evolved into Mannerism. The painter and architect Francisco de Holanda, writer of the book Diálogos da Pintura Antiga ("Dialogues on Ancient Painting"), disseminated in this treatise the fundamentals of this new style.

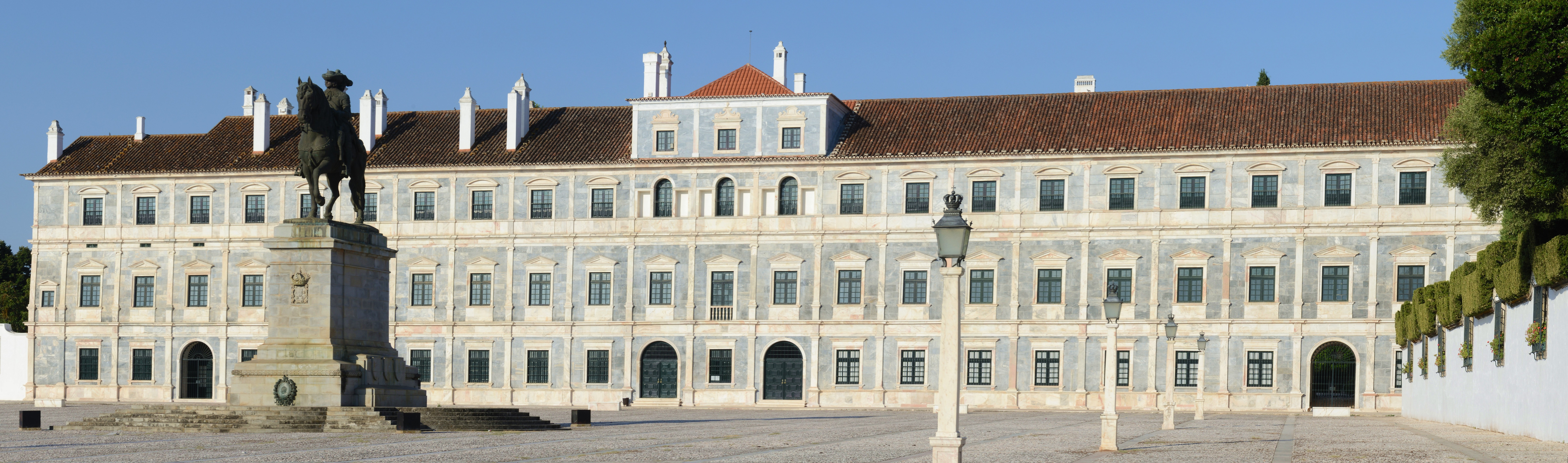
The façade of the Ducal Palace of Vila Viçosa, built by Teodósio I, Duke of Braganza in 1537

The Cloister of King João III, in Tomar, designed by Diogo de Torralva and Filippo Terzi; c. 1557–1591

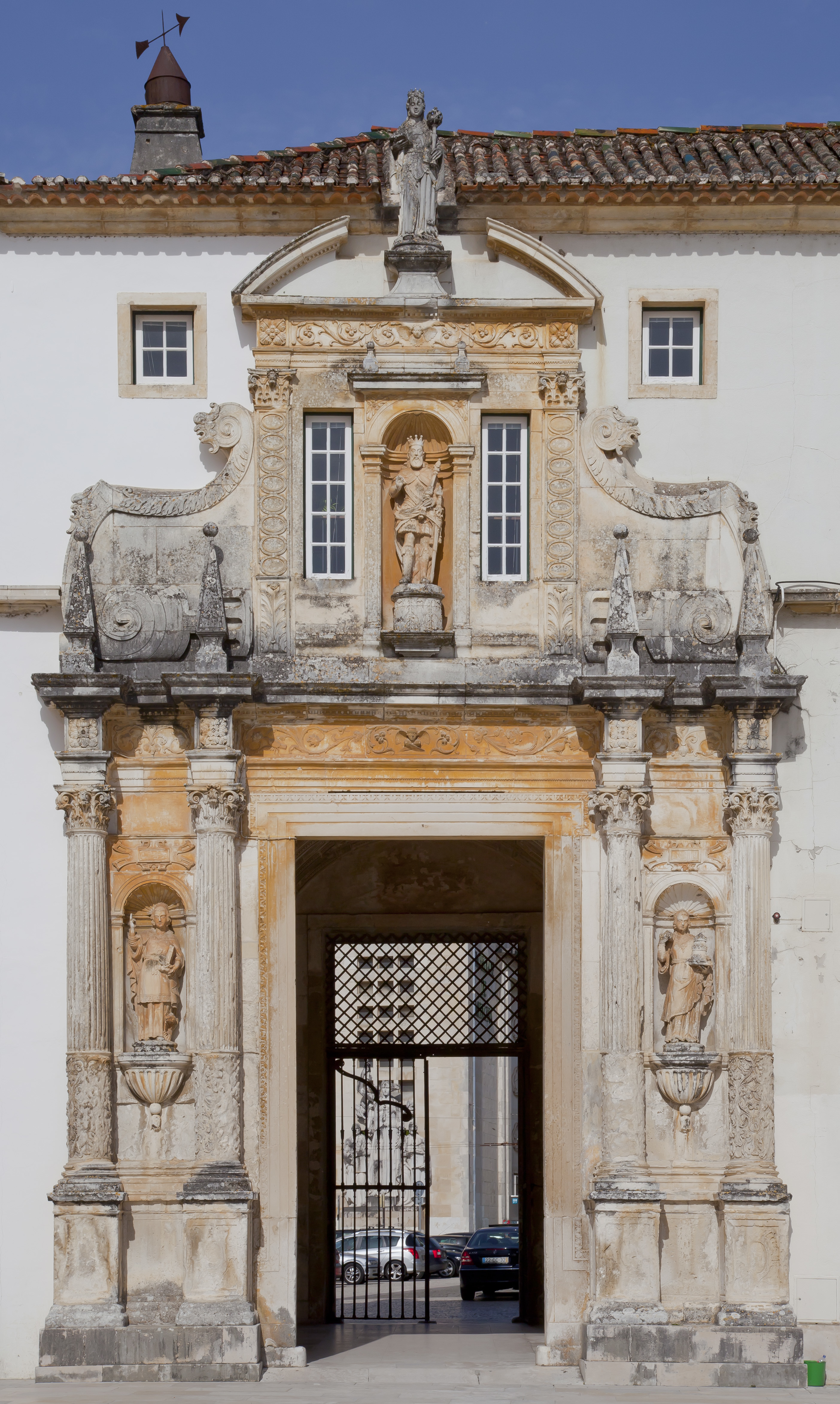
The Porta Férrea at the University of Coimbra

The basilica of Nossa Senhora da Conceição in Tomar was one of the earliest churches in pure Renaissance style. It was begun by the Castilian architect Diogo de Torralva in the period 1532–1540. Its beautiful and clear architecture turns it into one of the best early Renaissance buildings in Portugal. The small church of Bom Jesus de Valverde, south of Évora, attributed to both Manuel Pires and Diogo de Torralva, is another early example.

The most eminent example of this style is the Claustro de D. João III (Cloister of John III) in the Convent of the Order of Christ in Tomar. Started under the Portuguese King John III, it was finished during the reign of Philip I of Portugal (also King of Spain under the name of Philip II). The first architect was the Spaniard Diogo de Torralva, who began the work in 1557, only to be finished in 1591 by Philip II's architect, the Italian Filippo Terzi. This magnificent, two-storey cloister is considered one of the most important examples of Mannerist architecture in Portugal.

However, the best known Portuguese architect in this period was Afonso Álvares, whose works include the cathedrals of Leiria (1551–1574), Portalegre (begun 1556), and the Church of São Roque in Lisbon. During this period he evolved into the Mannerist style.

This last church was completed by the Jesuit architect, the Italian Filippo Terzi, who also built the Jesuit college at Évora, the Monastery of São Vicente de Fora in Lisbon and the episcopal palace in Coimbra. He had an enormous production and, besides churches, he also built several aqueducts and fortresses.

In his wake came several Portuguese architects:

- Miguel de Arruda: Church of Our Lady of Grace (in Évora)
- Baltasar Álvares, best known for the Sé Nova in Coimbra and the Igreja de São Lourenço in Porto.
- Francisco Velasquez: Cathedral of Mirando do Douro and the designs for the monastery of S. Salvador (Grijó)
- the military architect Manuel Pires: St. Anton's church in Évora.

=== Mannerism ===
The Monastery of São Vicente de Fora's façade was designed by Filippo Terzi and Juan de Herrera.

During the union of Portugal and Spain, the period between 1580 and 1640, a new style developed called "Arquitecture chã" (plain architecture) by George Kubler. Basically mannerist, this style also marked by a clear structure, a sturdy appearance with smooth, flat surfaces and a moderate arrangement of space, lacking excessive decorations. It is a radical break with the decorative Manueline style. This simplified style, caused by limited financial resources, expresses itself in the construction of hall churches and less impressive buildings. In resistance to the Baroque style that was already the standard in Spain, the Portuguese continued to apply the plain style to express their separate identity as a people.

Lisbon's São Roque Church, one of the most expensive interiors built during the Mannerist period in Europe

When king Philip II made his Joyous Entry in Lisbon in 1619, several temporary triumphal arches were erected in the Flemish style of Hans Vredeman de Vries. The tract literature of Wendel Dietterlin also increased the interest in Flemish Baroque architecture and art. This influence can be seen in the façade of the S Lourenço or Grilos church in Porto, begun in 1622 by Baltasar Alvares.

One of the most spectacular undertaking was however the building in Rome of the St John the Baptist chapel with the single purpose of obtaining the blessing of the pope Benedict XIV for this chapel. The chapel was designed by Luigi Vanvitelli in 1742 and built by Nicola Salvi in the church S. Antonio dei Portoghesi. After the benediction, the chapel was disassembled and transported to Lisbon. It was assembled again in 1747 in the S Roque church. It is opulently decorated with porphyry, the rarest marbles and precious stones. Its design already foreshadows the classical revival.

José Fernandes Pereira identified the first period from 1651 to 1690 as a period of experimentation. This period saw the rise of the combination of azulejos and the use of carved gilded wood (talha dourada) on altars and ceilings.

Other works in this period include :

- Baltasar Alvares built some of the most impressive examples in this style : the Sé Nova of Coimbra (1598–1640), the S Lourenço or Grilos church in Porto (begun 1614) and the church S Antão in Lisbon (1613–1656; now destroyed)..
- Other examples are the several Benedictine constructions in this period, such as the renovation by João Turriano of the Monastery of Tibães and the Monastery of São Bento (now the Portuguese Parliament).
- Francisco de Mora designed the convent of Nossa Senhora dos Remédios (Évora) for the order of the Discalced Carmelites (1601–1614)
- The Church of Senhor da Cruz in Barcelos, built by João Antunes in 1701–1704 is an unusual experiment because of its four-leaf clover plan.
- Pedro Nunes Tinoco designed in 1616 the church of S Marta (Lisbon) for the Order of the Poor Clares.

=== Baroque period ===
Santa Engrácia National Pantheon, designed by João Antunes in 1681

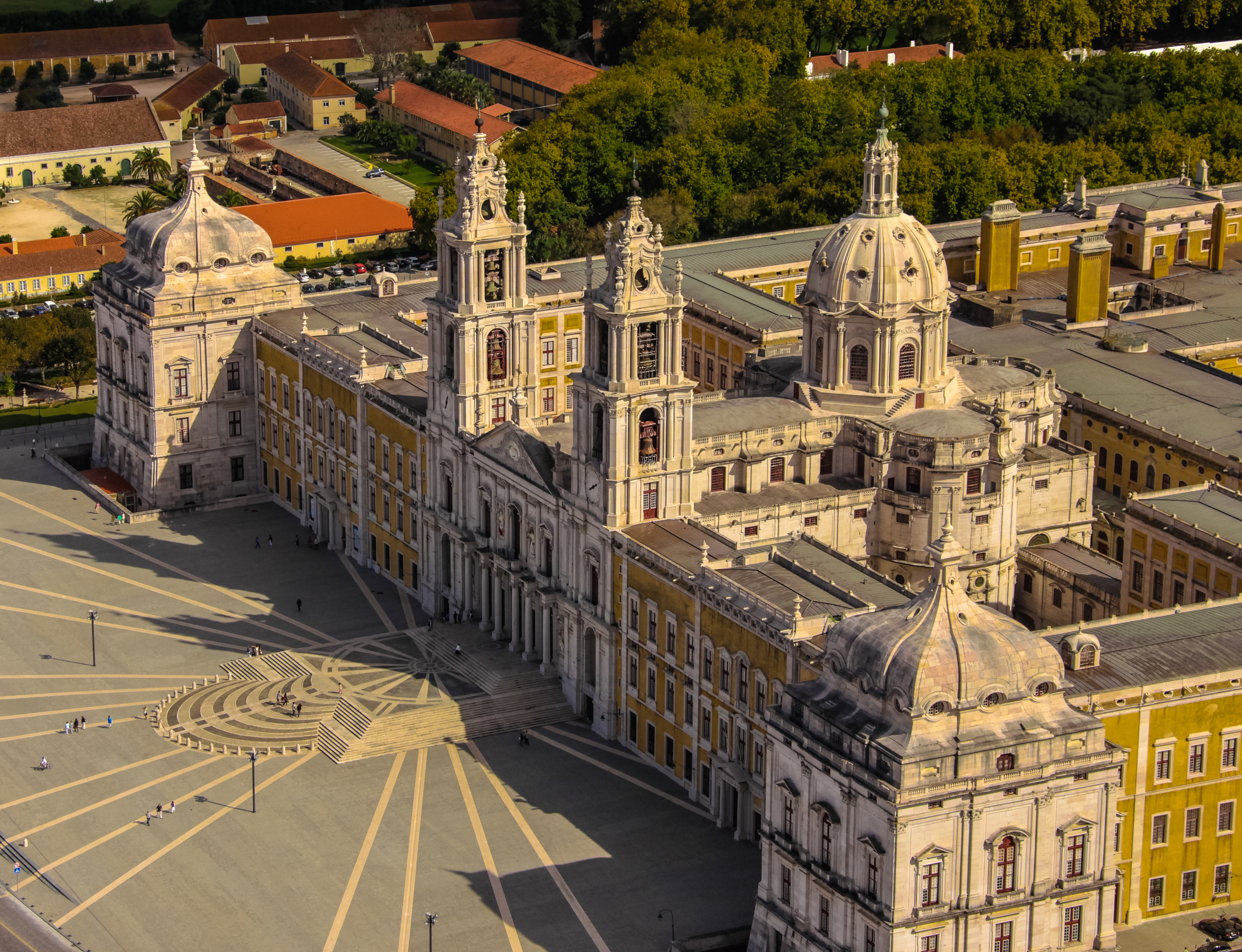
The Royal Building of Mafra, a UNESCO World Heritage Site

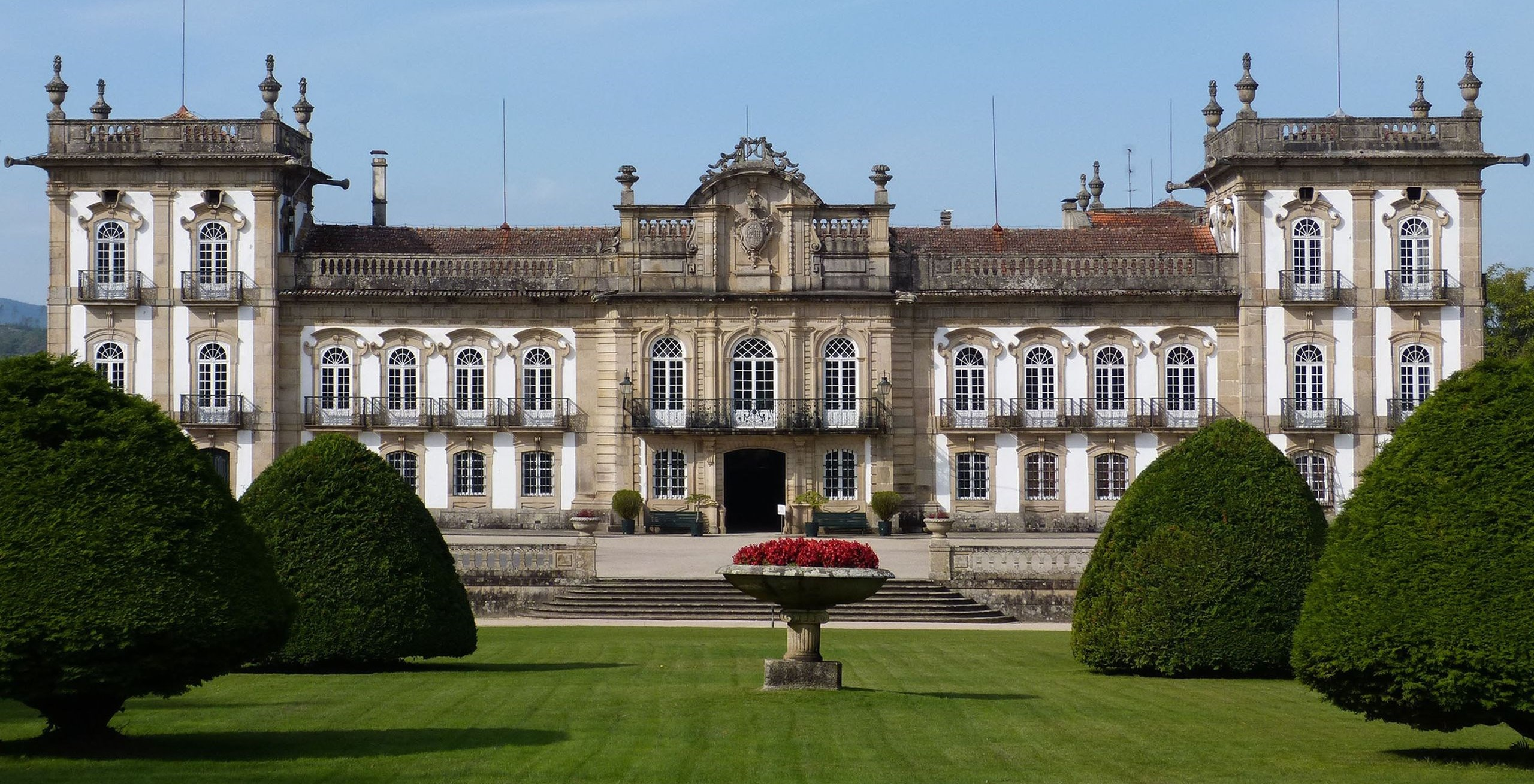
Brejoeira Palace in Monção; designed by Carlos Amarante

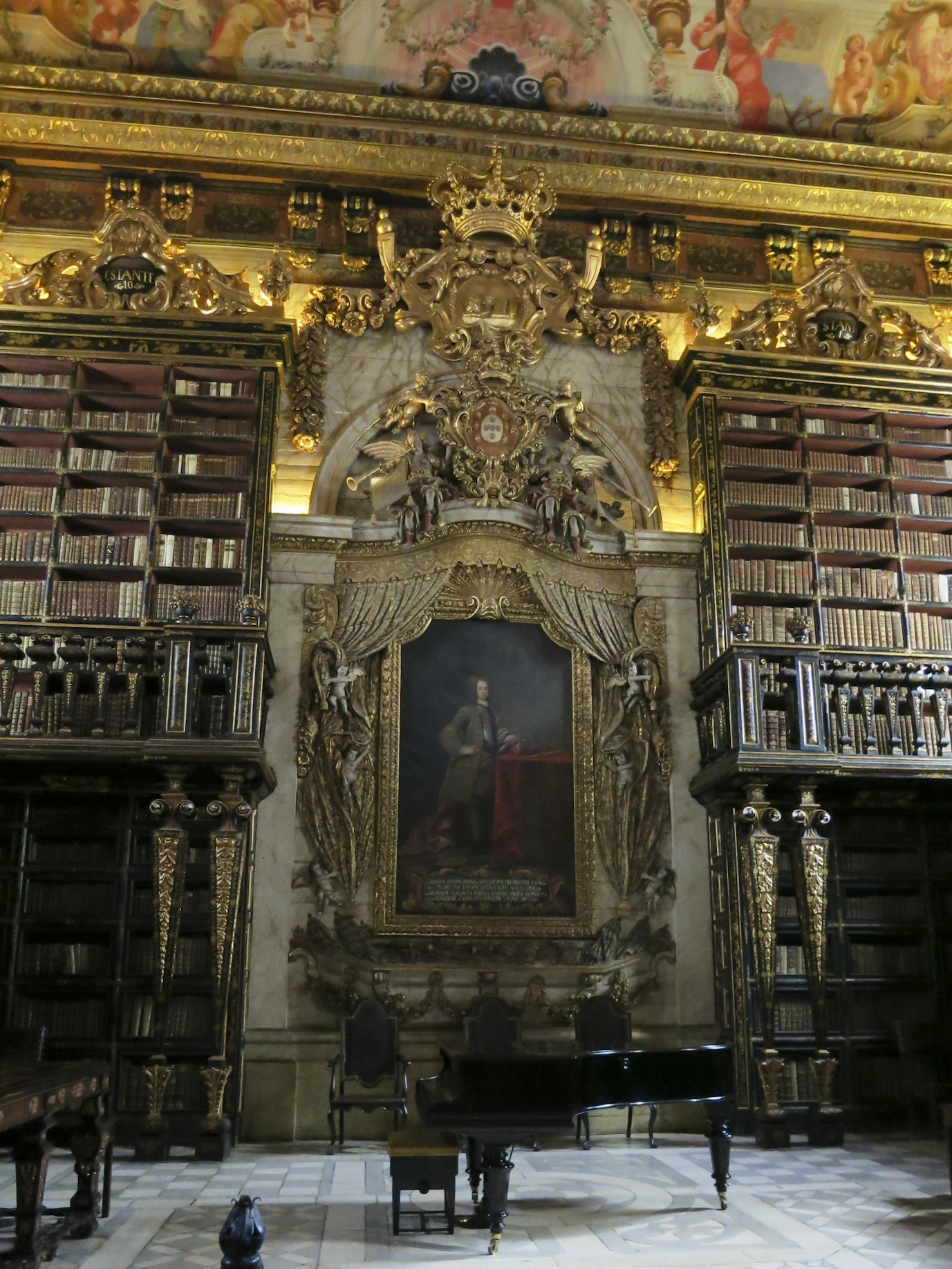
The Biblioteca Joanina, built in 1717

Baroque architecture in Portugal has a very special situation and a different timeline from the rest of Europe. It was shaped by several political, artistic and economic factors, that originate several phases, and different kinds of outside influences, resulting in a unique blend.

The year 1697 is an important year for Portuguese architecture. In that year gold, gems and later diamonds were found in Minas Gerais, Brazil. Mining exploration was strongly controlled by the Portuguese Crown, which imposed heavy taxes on everything extracted (one fifth of all gold would go to the Crown). These enormous proceeds caused Portugal to prosper and become the richest country of Europe in the 18th century.

In the reign of King King John V, the baroque underwent a time of splendour and wealth completely new in Portugal. Despite the destruction wreaked by the 1755 earthquake, the quality of the buildings which have survived to this day is still impressive. The Palácio da Ribeira, the Royal Chapel (both destroyed in the earthquake) and the Mafra National Palace, are the main works of the King. The Águas Livres Aqueduct brings water to Lisbon covering a distance of 11.18 miles, with emphasis on the section over the Alcântara valley because of the monumentality of the imposing arches. However, across the country, are still visible marks of the pomp of the time in major or small works. The gilded woodcarving took on national characteristics because of the significance and richness of the decorations. The painting, sculpture, decorative arts and tiling also experienced great development.

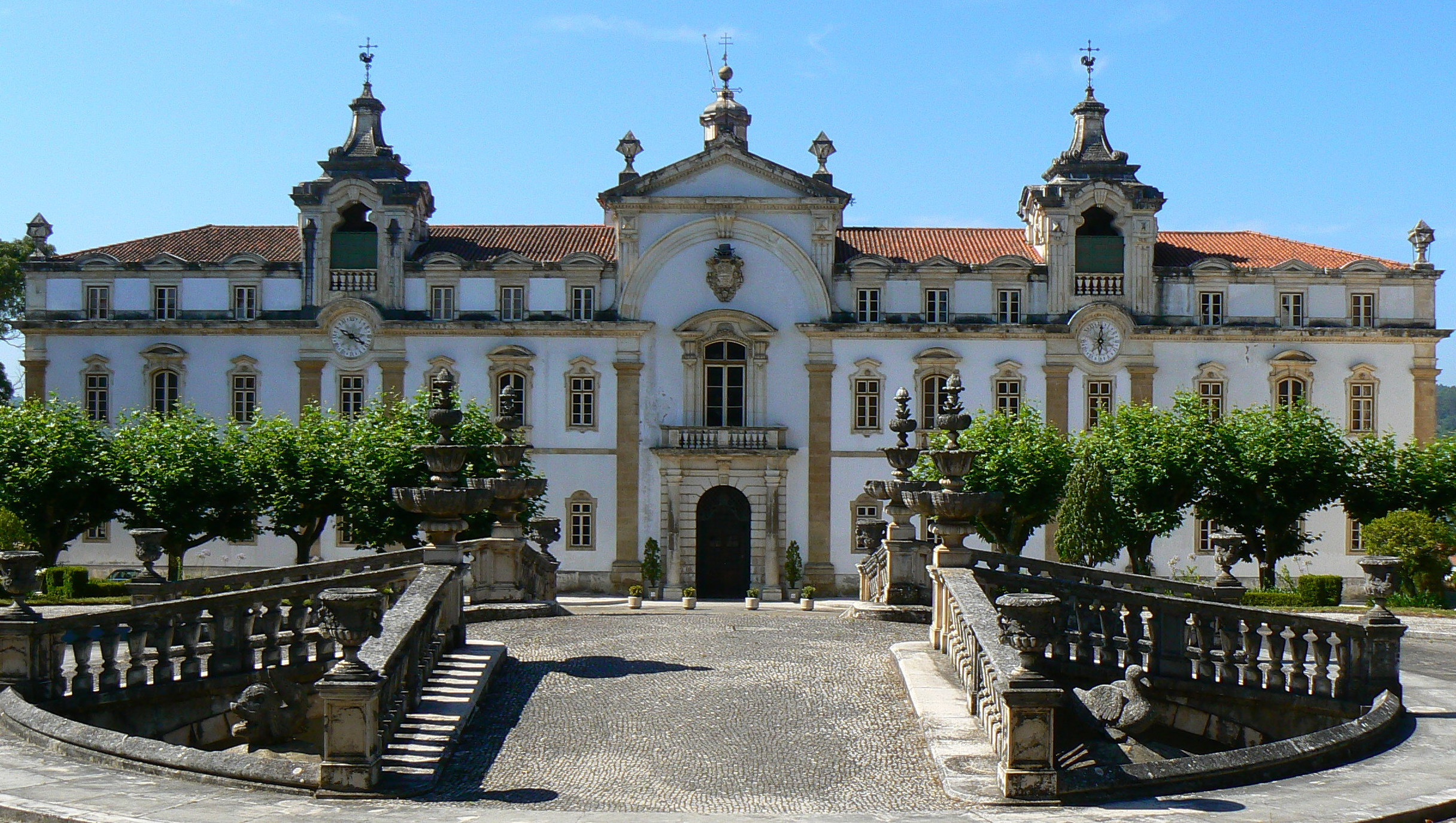
The Seminário Maior da Sagrada Família in Coimbra, c. 1748–1765

The Mafra National Palace is among the most sumptuous Baroque buildings in Portugal. This monumental palace-monastery-church complex is even larger than the El Escorial, an immense 16th-century Spanish royal palace north of Madrid to emphasize the symbolic affirmation of his power. The king appointed Johann Friedrich Ludwig (known in Portugal as João Frederico Ludovice) as the architect. This German goldsmith had received some experience as an architect, working for the Jesuits in Rome. His design for the palace is a synthesis of St. Peter's Basilica in the Vatican, the Jesuit Sant'Ignazio church in Rome and the Palazzo Montecitorio, designed by Gian Lorenzo Bernini.

This design was in line with the king's desire to imitate the Eternal City, and with his ambition to found a "second Rome" at the river Tagus. His envoys in Rome had to provide the king with models and floor plans of many Roman monuments.

One of these was the Patriarchal palace in Lisbon. The Piedmontese architect Filippo Juvarra was brought to Lisbon to draw up the plans. But this project was also toned down because Juvarra only stayed for a few months and left – breaking his contract – for London.

Other important constructions were :

- 1729–1748 : the Águas Livres aqueduct in Lisbon (by Manuel da Maia, Antonio Canevari and Custódio Vieira), described by contemporaries as the ‘greatest work since the Romans’. It provided Lisbon with water, but also the many new monumental fountains built by the Hungarian Carlos Mardel
- 1728–1732 : the Quinta de S Antão do Tojal (by the Italian architect Antonio Canevari)
- 1755 (completed) : the Ópera do Tejo (destroyed later that year) (by Giovanni Carlo Sicinio-Bibiena)
- (completed in 1750) Palace of Necessidades (by Eugénio dos Santos, Custodio Vieira, Manuel da Costa Negreiros and Caetano Tomas de Sousa)

=== Rococo style ===
Mafra Palace library, designed by Manuel Caetano de Sousa

Rococo architecture entered Portugal through the north, while Lisbon, due to the court pomp, remained in the Baroque. It is an architecture that follows the international taste in decoration, and, as a result of the contrast between dark granite and white walls, has a clearly Portuguese profile. The decoration is naturalist, based mainly in shells and leaves but also with architectural elements and sculpture.

Queluz National Palace, designed by Mateus Vicente de Oliveira

Pilgrimage places became fashionable, often built in places of rough prominence, allowing impressive staircases of big scenographic effect. André Soares worked in the region of Braga, and produced some of the main examples such as Falperra Sanctuary, Congregados Church, the Braga City Hall and Casa do Raio, among many others. The number of buildings and architects is large and, because the north of Portugal was spared from the ravages of the 1755 Lisbon earthquake, there is a large number of buildings.

A different and more exuberant Baroque style with some Rococo touches, more reminiscent of the style in Central Europe, developed in the northern part of Portugal. The Italian architect Nicolau Nasoni designed the church and the spectacular granite tower of São Pedro dos Clérigos in Porto. One of his successors was the painter and architect José de Figueiredo Seixas, who had been one of his disciples. The sanctuary Bom Jesus do Monte near Braga, built by the architect Carlos Luis Ferreira Amarante is a notable example of a pilgrimage site with a monumental, cascading Baroque stairway that climbs 116 metres. This last example already shows the shift in style to Neo-classicism.

The Palácio do Raio (by André Soares) is an outstanding Baroque-Rococo urban palace with richly decorated façade in Braga. Several country houses and manors in late-Baroque style were built in this period. Typical examples are the homes of the Lobo-Machado family (in Guimarães), the Malheiro (Viana do Castelo) and the Mateus (Vila Real).

=== Pombaline style ===
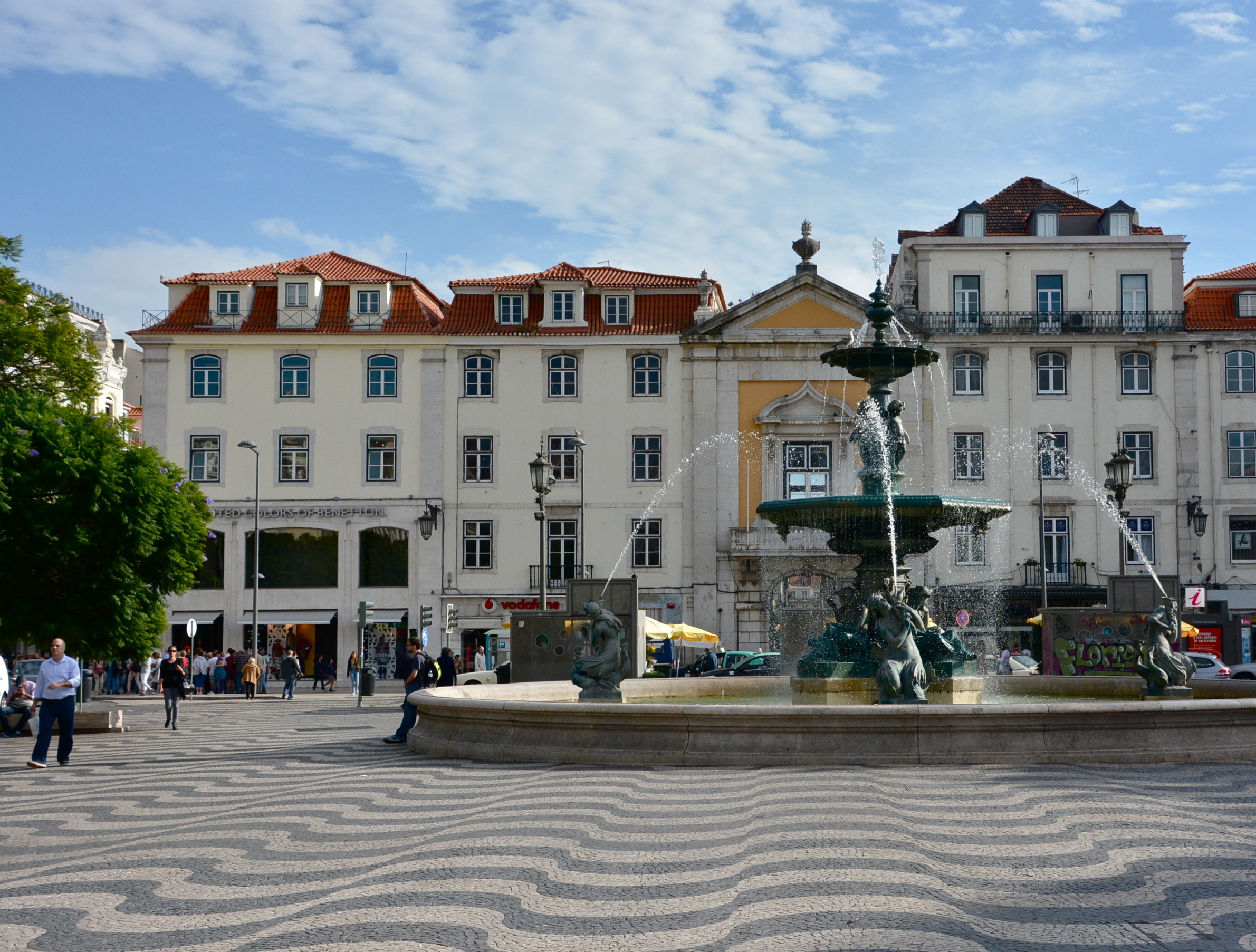
The Pombaline Baixa was built after the 1755 Lisbon earthquake.

The 1755 Lisbon earthquake and the subsequent tsunami and fires destroyed many buildings in Lisbon. Joseph I of Portugal and his Prime Minister Sebastião de Melo, Marquis of Pombal hired architects and engineers to rebuild the damaged portions of Lisbon, including the Pombaline Downtown.

The Praça do Comércio, designed by Eugénio dos Santos in 1755

The Pombaline style is a secular, utilitarian architecture marked by pragmatism. It follows the Plain style of the military engineers, with regular, rational arrangements, mixed with Rococo details and a Neo-classical approach to structure. The Baixa district of Lisbon was rebuilt by Eugénio dos Santos and Carlos Mardel. The Marquis of Pombal imposed strict conditions on the rebuilding. Architectural models were tested by having troops march around them to simulate an earthquake, making the Pombaline one of the first examples of earthquake-resistant construction. The Praça do Comércio, the Augusta street and the Avenida da Liberdade are notable examples of this architecture. This Square of Commerce was given a regular, rational arrangement in line with the reconstruction of the new Pombaline Downtown, the Baixa.

The Pombaline style of architecture is also to be found in Vila Real de Santo António (1773–1775) a new town in the Algarve, built by Reinaldo Manuel dos Santos. The style is clearly visible in the urban arrangement and especially in the main square.

=== Neoclassical ===
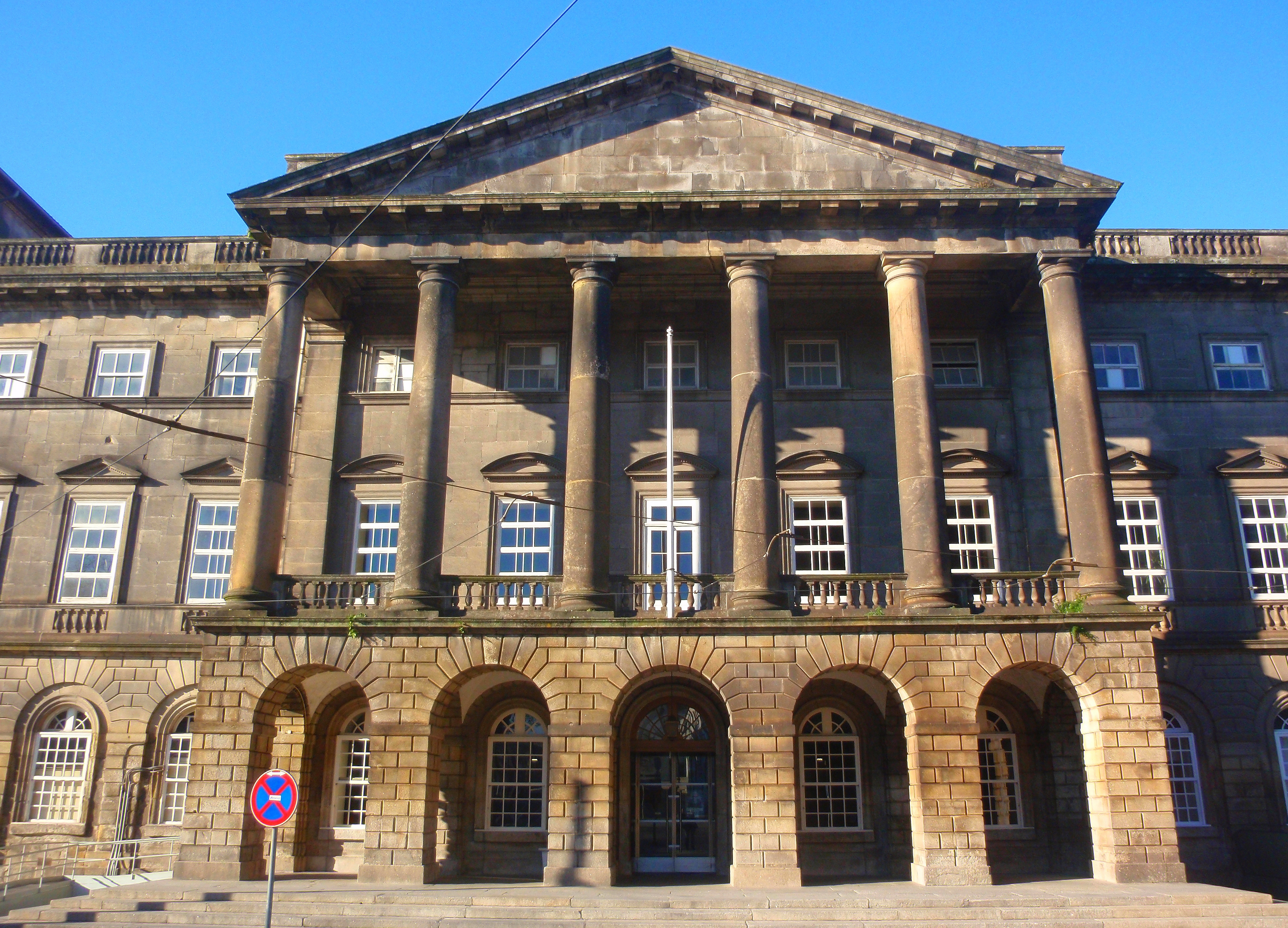
Santo António Hospital in Porto

The arrival of neoclassical trends in Portugal were largely postponed due to the reconstruction efforts following the 1755 Lisbon earthquake. It was the 1770s that ushered in the era of neoclassical architecture, with the simultaneous constructions of the Royal Riding Hall of Belém, in Lisbon, and Santo António Hospital in Porto, by John Carr. Quickly after its introduction to mainstream Portuguese architecture, two emergent schools of neoclassicism in Portugal emerged: a northern school, based in Porto and Braga, which was greatly influenced by British neoclassicism and Palladian architecture, and a southern school based in Lisbon, largely influenced by Italian and later French trends.

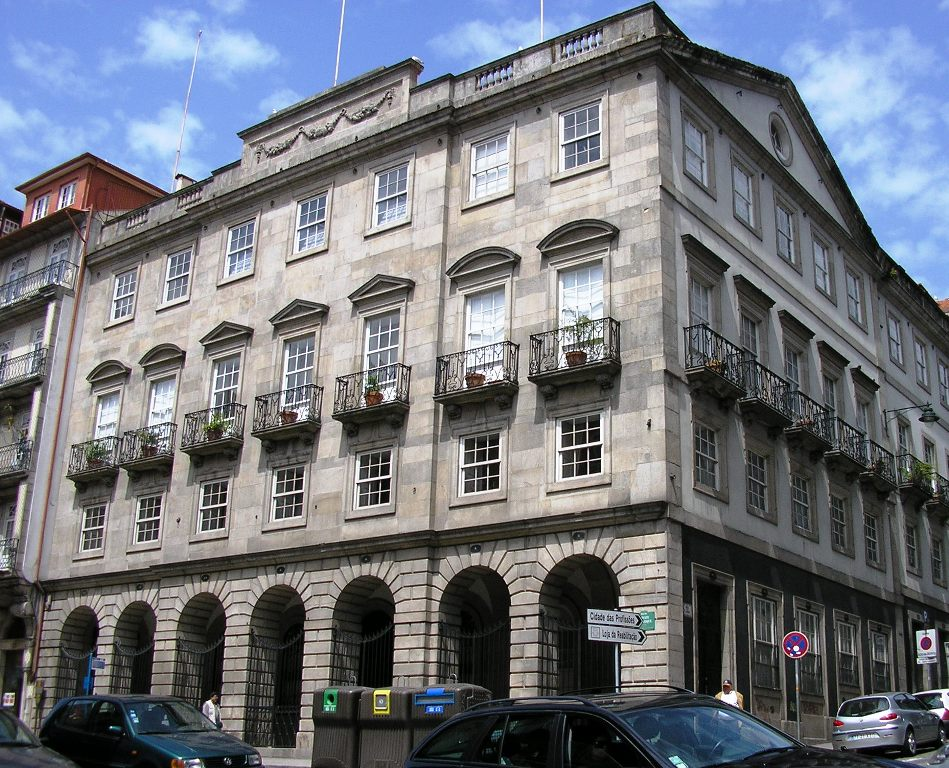
Factory House in Porto

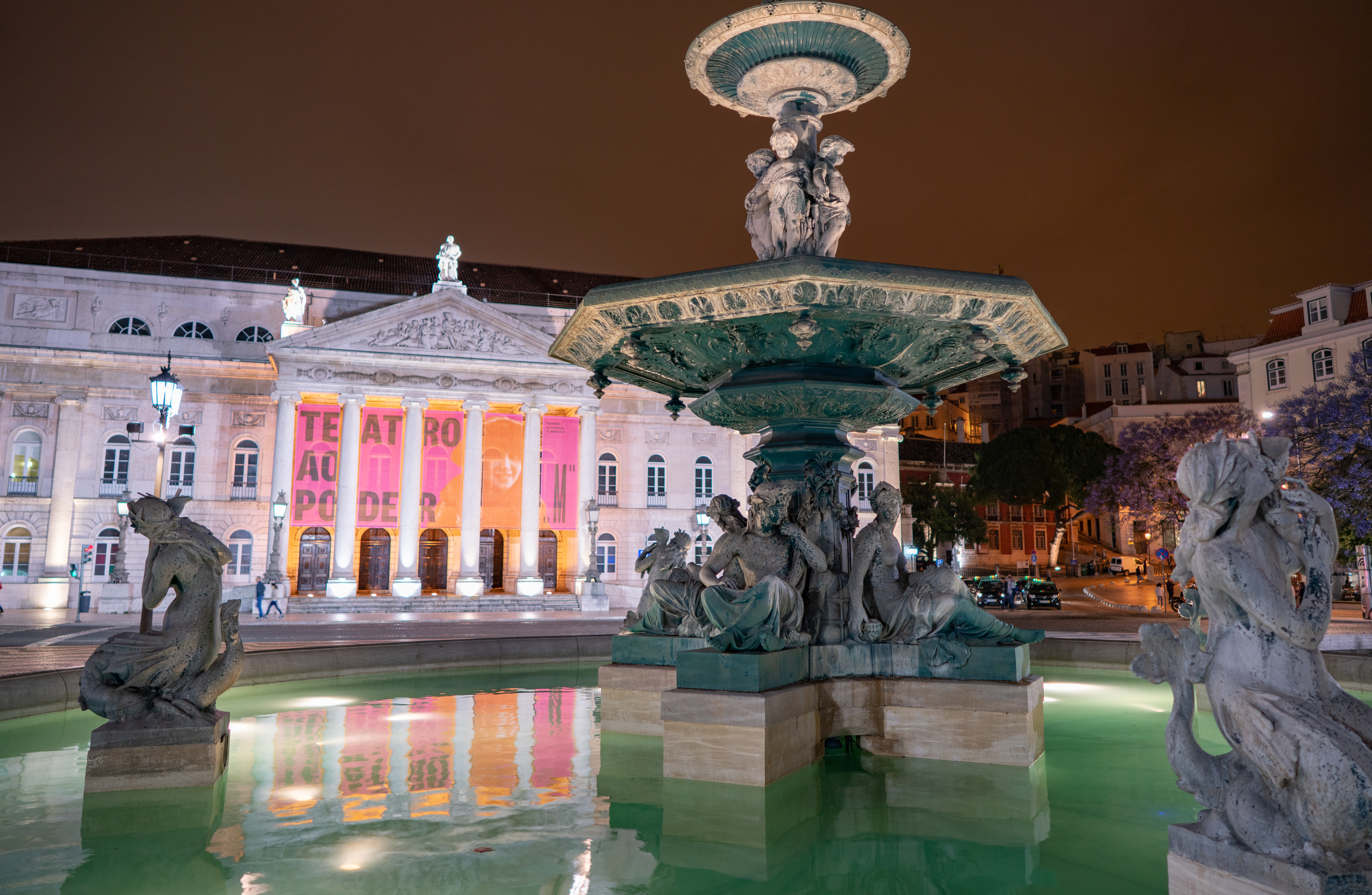
Lisbon's Maria II National Theatre

Though neoclassical trends persisted throughout Portugal well beyond the larger European period of neoclassicism, Porto produced the greatest number of architects and buildings practicing neoclassical styles, the movement not having gained as much support or traction in Lisbon. Of the northern school, Carlos Amarante was one of the most popular architects in both Porto and Braga, designing numerous notable landmarks in either city, including the University of Porto Rectory in Porto and the Bom Jesus do Monte and Pópulo Churches in Braga.

Notable works in the northern tradition:

- Palácio da Bolsa in Porto, designed by Joaquim da Costa Lima Júnior
- Factory House in Porto, designed by John Whitehead
- Carrancas Palace in Porto, designed by Joaquim da Costa Lima Sampaio
- Santo António Hospital in Porto, designed by John Carr
- Cadeia da Relação in Porto, designed by Eugénio dos Santos

Notable works in the southern tradition:

- Palace of Ajuda in Lisbon, designed by José da Costa e Silva
- Teatro Nacional de São Carlos in Lisbon, designed by José da Costa e Silva
- D. Maria II National Theatre in Lisbon, designed by Fortunato Lodi
- Belém Riding Hall of Belém Palace in Lisbon, designed by Giacomo Azzolini

=== Neo-Manueline ===
Quinta da Regaleira, in Sintra, Portuguese Riviera; Luigi Manini, 1889

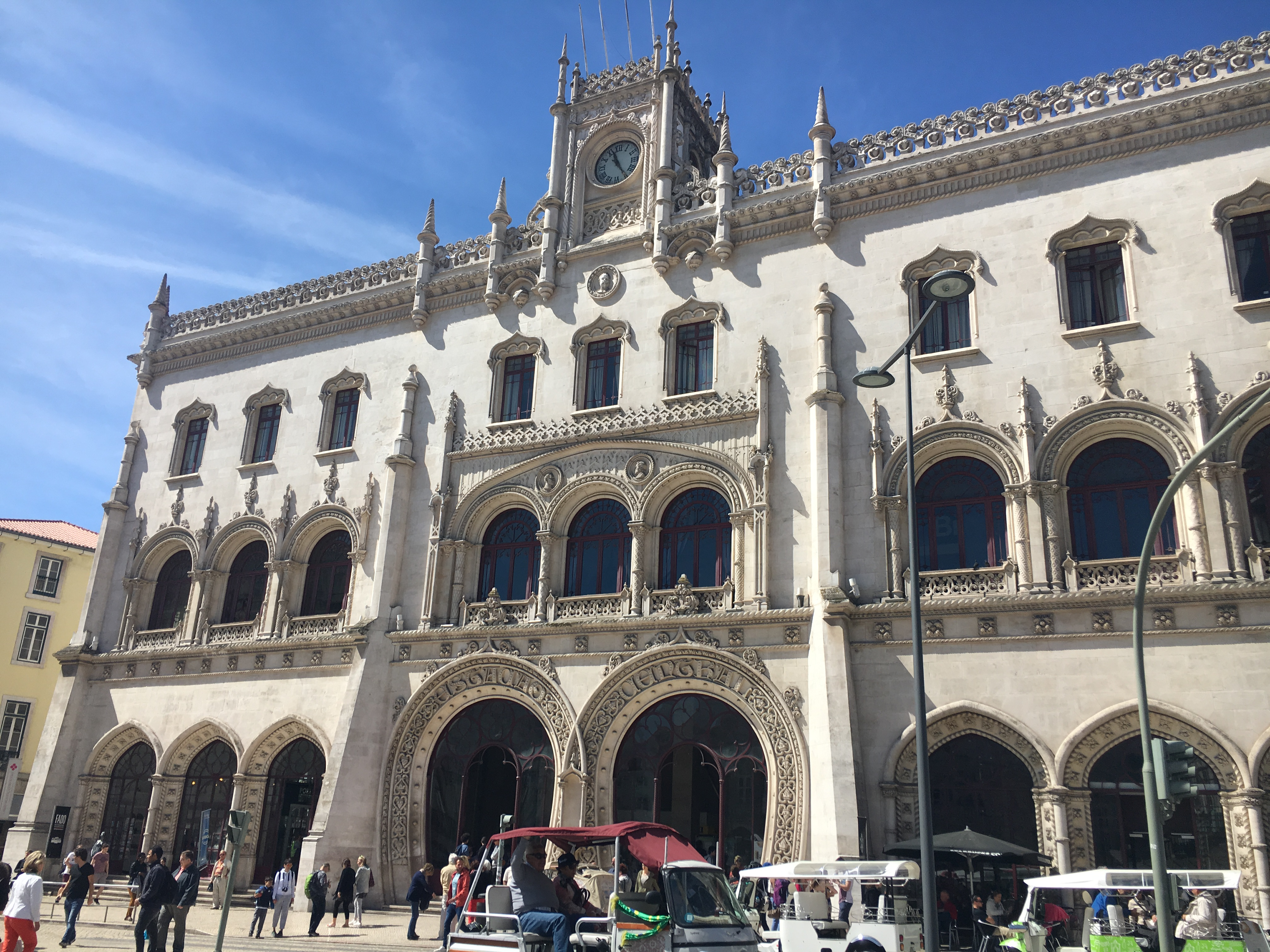
Rossio Railway Station in Lisbon; José Luís Monteiro, 1886

The Neo-Manueline style, a revival style of late 16th century Portuguese Late Gothic Manueline, was the primary architectural expression of Romanticism in Portugal, owing to its highly nationalistic characteristics and history, which flourished from the middle of the 19th century to the beginning of the 20th in Portugal and Brazil, and to a lesser extent other parts of the Lusofonia (Portuguese speaking world).

The style, which rose during a time of Romantic nationalism, heavily features Portuguese national symbols, including the armillary sphere, the Cross of the Order of Christ, and elements of the Coat of arms of Portugal, as well as symbols of the Portuguese Discoveries, such as twisted ropes, exotic fruits and vegetables (like pineapples and artichokes), sea monsters, and sea plants (like coral and algae branches).

The first recognized Neo-Manueline architectural works were done between 1839 and 1849 with the building of Pena National Palace, in Sintra, by King Ferdinand II of Portugal. A romanticist palace fusing Neo-Manueline, Neo-Mudéjar, and Portuguese Renaissance characteristics, Pena Palace's large Neo-Manueline Window is a 19th-century adaptation of the large Manueline Window of the Convent of Christ of Tomar.

While Neo-Manueline buildings can be found throughout all of Portugal and the Lusofonia, the greatest concentration of works are located in Lisbon, from where the majority of original Manueline designs and monuments are found, and the nearby Portuguese Riviera, notably Sintra.

=== Neo-Mudéjar ===
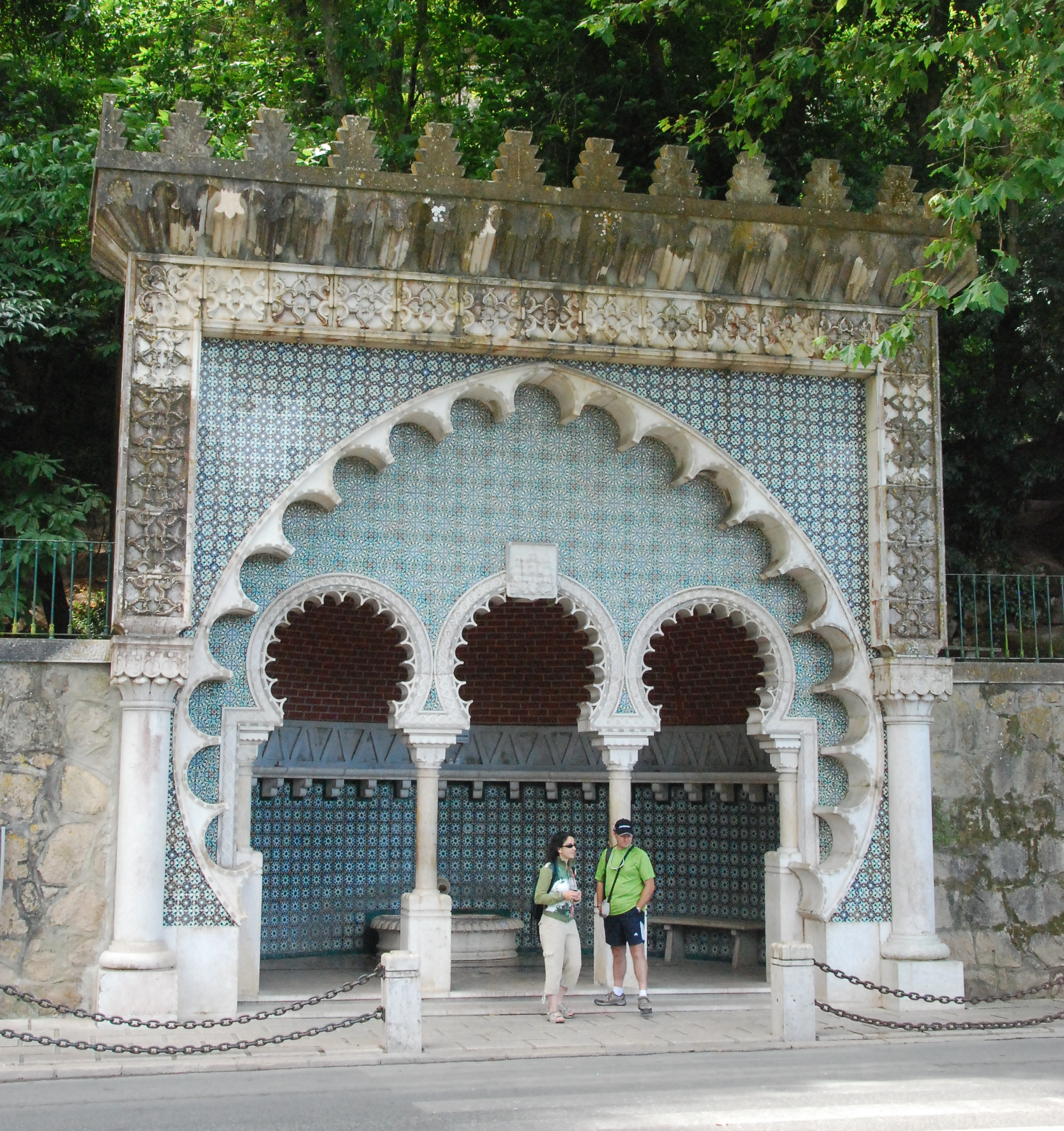
Fonte Mourisca in Sintra, c. 1922

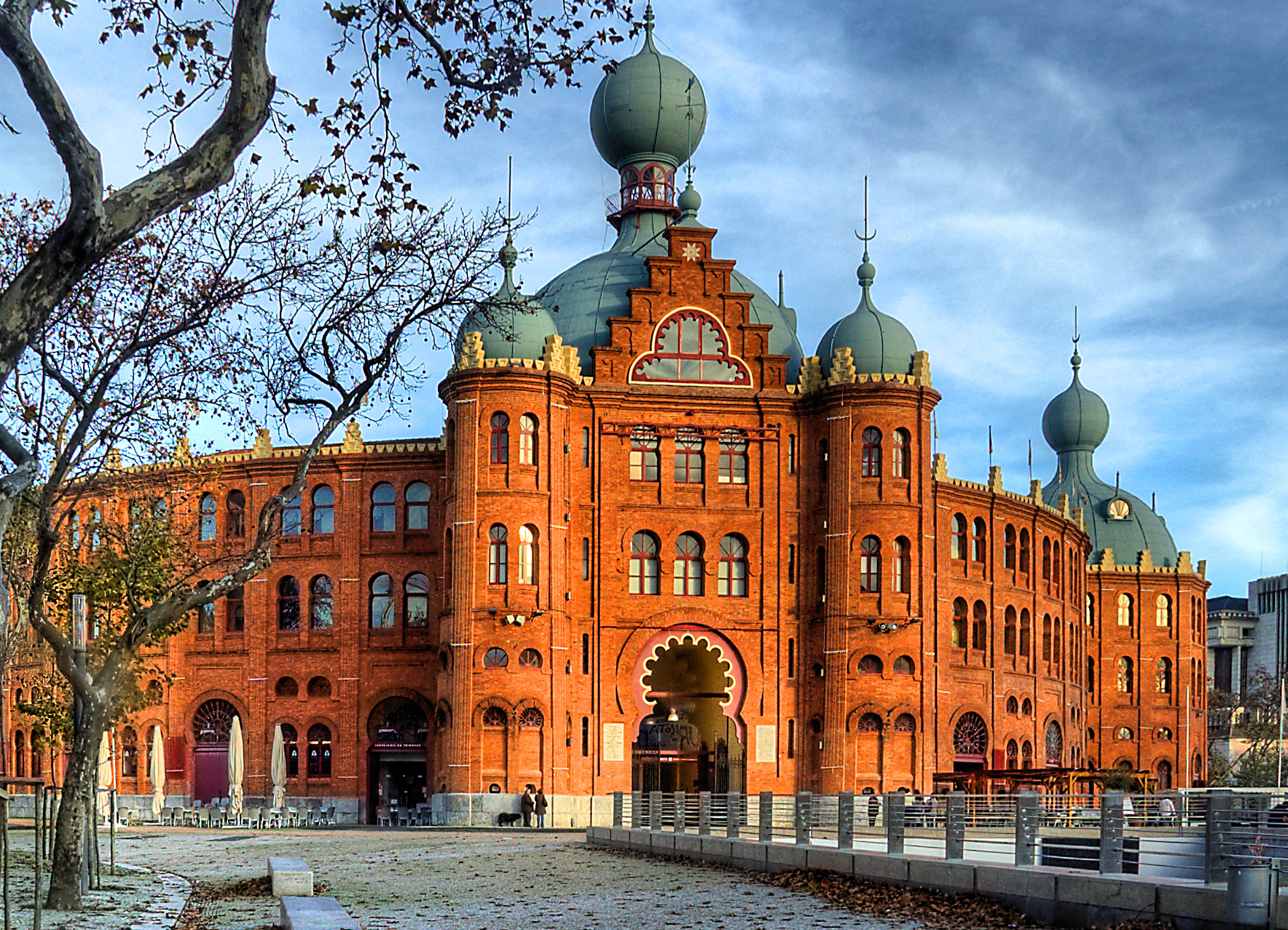
Campo Pequeno Bullring, c. 1892

The Neo-Mudéjar is a type of exuberant Moorish Revival architecture practiced in the Iberian Peninsula, and to a lesser extent Ibero-America, which evokes the Moorish heritage of Iberia, a fashion which flourished at the end of the 19th century and early 20th century. The style's popularity in Portugal was vastly concentrated in Lisbon and the Portuguese Riviera, and the southern regions of the Algarve and the Alentejo, as these had the most visible Moorish heritage in the country.

Like the Neo-Manueline revival, the first works of Neo-Mudéjar in Portugal were done between 1839 and 1849 with the building of Pena National Palace, a romanticist palace fusing Neo-Manueline, Neo-Mudéjar, and Portuguese Renaissance characteristics in Sintra. Sintra soon became home to other notable Neo-Mudéjar estates, such as Monserrate Palace, designed by James Thomas Knowles, and Quinta do Relógio, designed by António da Fonseca Júnior, characterised by often fantastical, fairytale like architectural and decorative features en vogue in other parts of Europe such as Austria and Germany.

Notable works in Lisbon include large monuments like the Campo Pequeno Bullring, dating from 1892 and designed by architect António José Dias da Silva, as well as numerous famous estates, such as the 1877 Palácio Ribeira da Cunha in the Príncipe Real district and 1891 Palácio Conceição da Silva, on the Avenida da Liberdade.

The style's expression in the North of Portugal is primarily used in interior design, such as the sumptuous Sala Arabe of Palácio da Bolsa, in Porto, or is heavily altered and mixed with other revival styles and trends in building exteriors, like Porto's Devesas Factory Warehouse

=== Cast-iron architecture ===
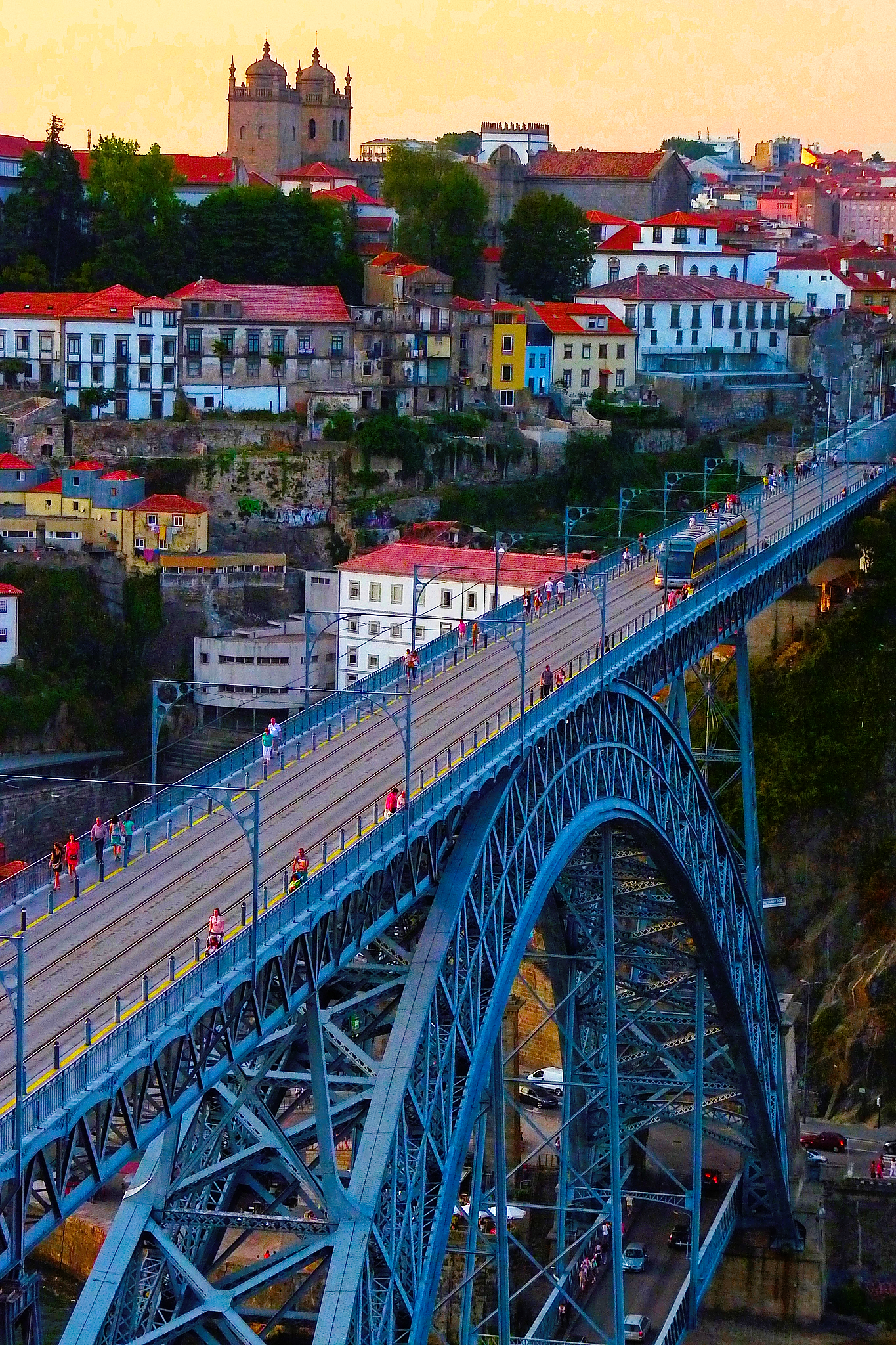
Dom Luís I Bridge, Porto

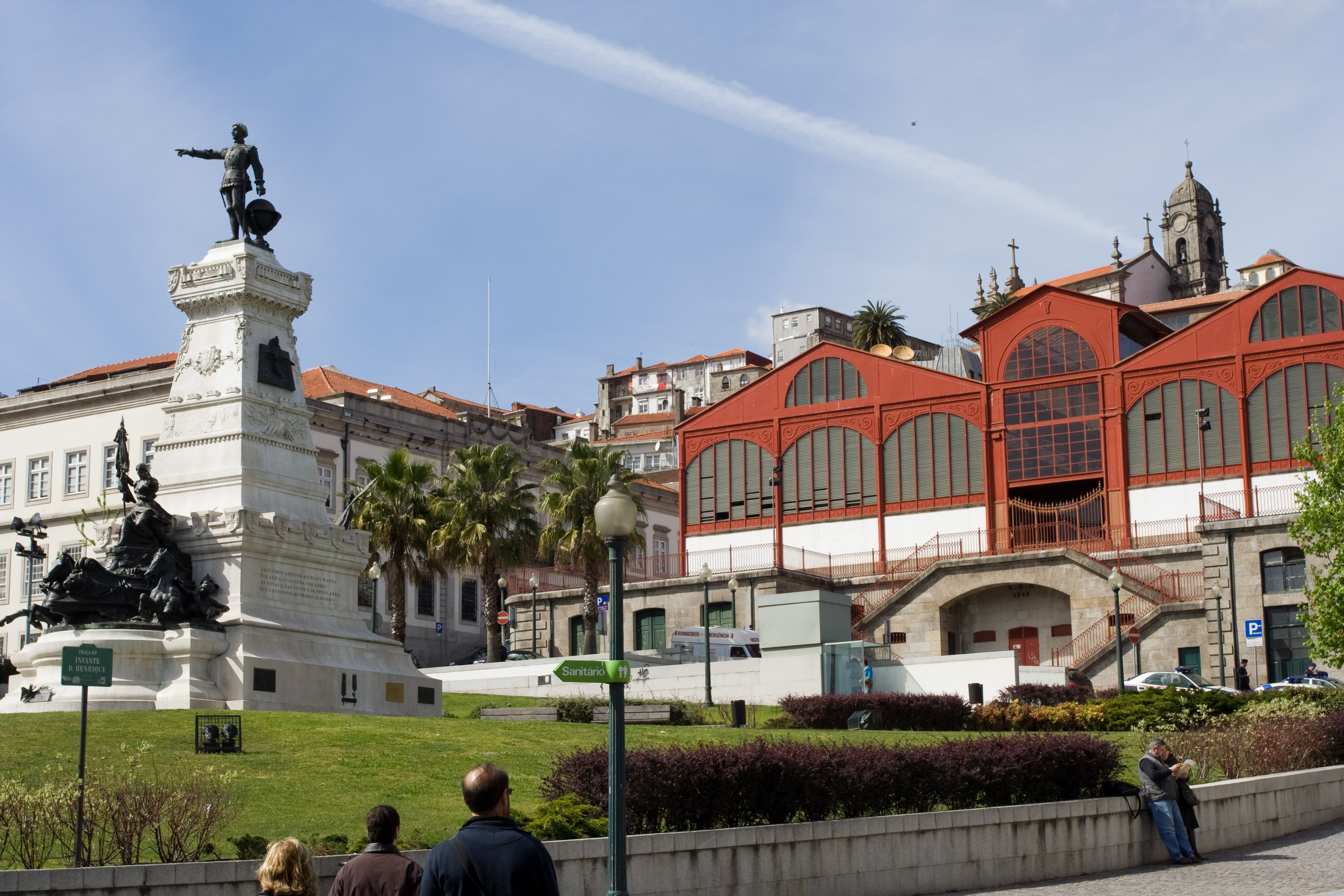
Mercado Ferreira Borges in Porto

Cast-iron architecture, known simply as iron architecture in Portuguese (arquitetura de ferro), largely began to manifest during the last quarter of the 19th century. While revolutionary in regards to technical advancement, structural integrity, and other engineering feats, the stylistic trends of iron architecture were almost completely based in historicism and revival styles.

The application of iron architecture was limited to certain fields of building, largely either infrastructural, such as bridges, railway stations, and elevators, or buildings relevant to the common good, such as exhibition halls, municipal markets, or commercial centers.

Notable iron structures in Portugal include:

- Santa Justa Elevator in Lisbon
- Dom Luís I Bridge in Porto
- Maria Pia Bridge in Porto
- Mercado Ferreira Borges in Porto
- Palácio de Cristal in Porto (demolished)

=== Art Nouveau ===
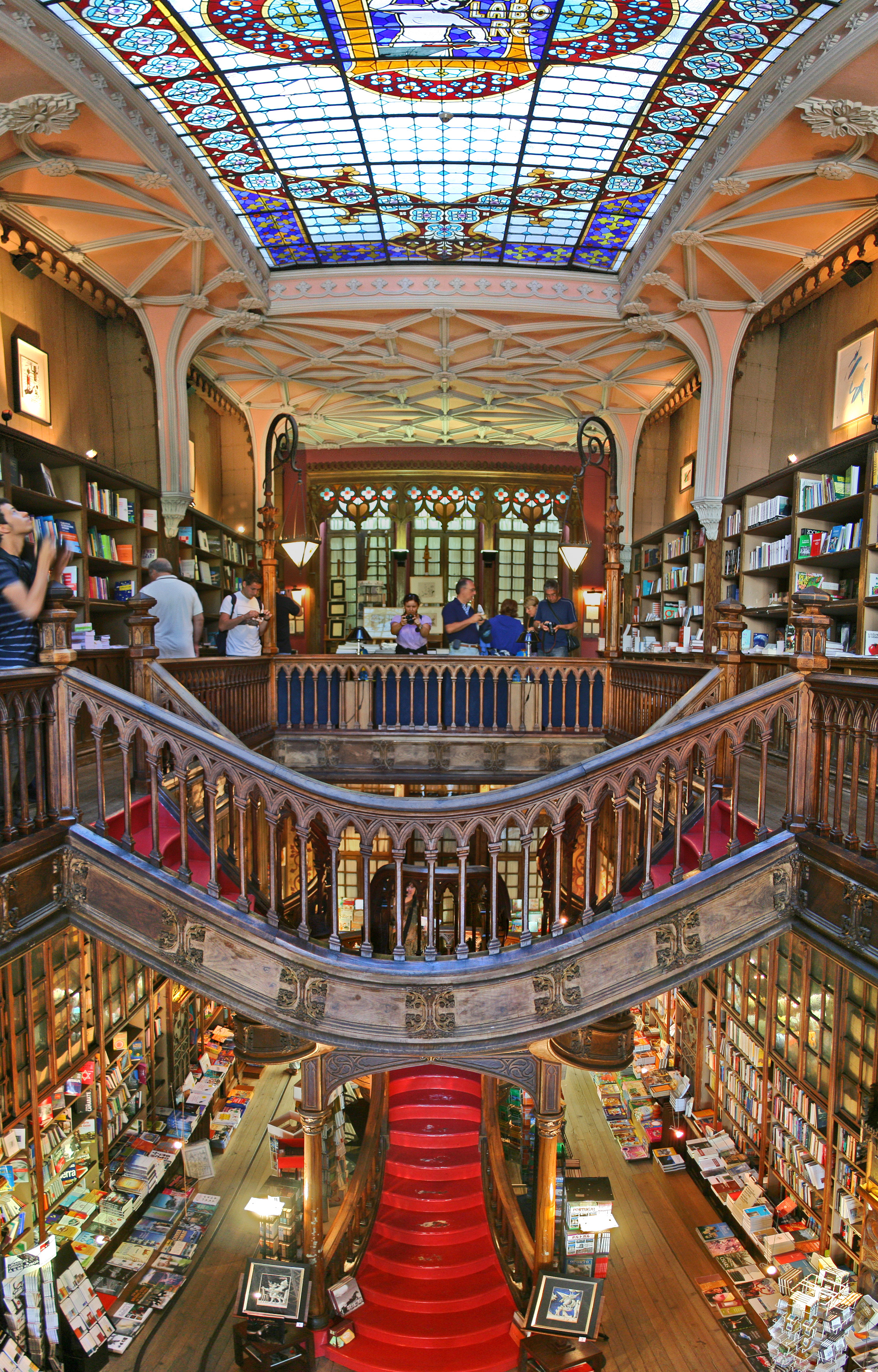
Livraria Lello in Porto

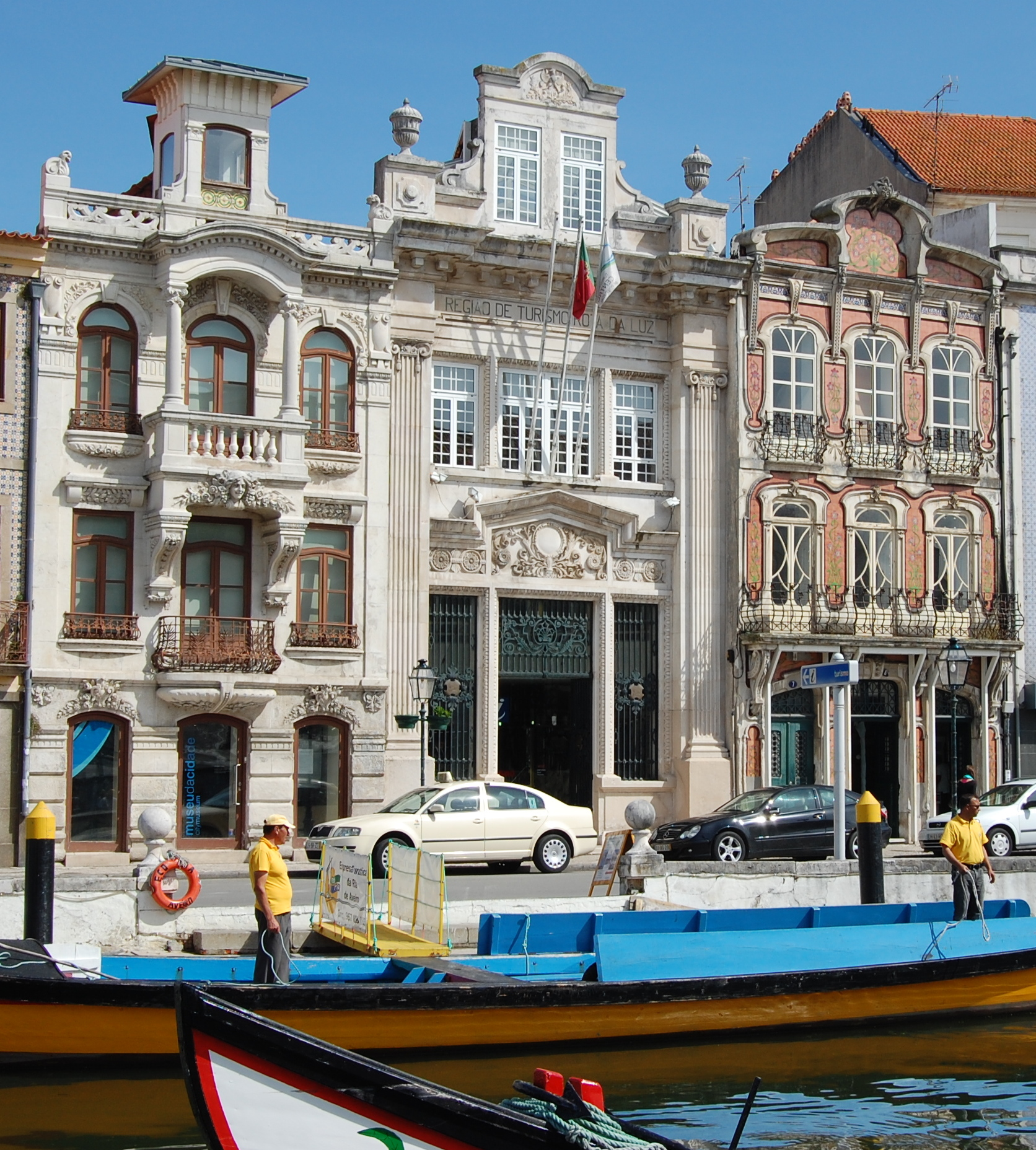
Arte Nova homes by Aveiro canals

Art Nouveau, known in Portugal as Arte Nova, had a late arrival and short duration in the history of Portugal, flourishing largely between 1905 and 1920. In terms of international relationships, Portuguese Arte Nova is more in line with the school of French Art Nouveau than the Austrian schools of the time. The use of Arte Nova was largely spread by the urban elite of the Portuguese aristocracy, primarily in port cities such as Lisbon, Porto, and Aveiro.

The concept defining Art Nouveau variation of Aveiro (Portugal) called Arte Nova was ostentation: the style was brought by a conservative bourgeoisie who wanted to express their might by decorative façades leaving interiors conservative. Another distinctive feature of Arte Nova was using locally produced tiles with Art Nouveau motifs.

There most notable examples of Arte Nova in Portugal, outside of Aveiro, include:

- Museum-Residence Dr. Anastácio Gonçalves by Manuel Joaquim Norte Júnior (1904–1905) in Lisbon
- Café Majestic by João Queiroz (1921) in Porto
- Livraria Lello bookstore by Xavier Esteves (1906) in Porto.

The most influential artist of Arte Nova is Francisco Augusto da Silva Rocha. He designed many buildings both in Aveiro and in other cities in Portugal, while actually not being an architect (it was common for Aveiro that time). One of them has both an exterior and interior of Art Nouveau and now hosts the Museum of Arte Nova – it is the Major Pessoa Residence. Another notable example is the Former Cooperativa Agrícola featuring hand-painted tiles. There are some Art Nouveau sculptures at the Central cemetery of Aveiro as well.

=== Modern architecture ===
Casa das Histórias Paula Rego, Portuguese Riviera; designed by Eduardo Souto de Moura, 2000

One of the top architecture schools in the world, known as "Escola do Porto" or School of Porto, is located in Portugal. Its alumni include Fernando Távora, Álvaro Siza (winner of the 1992 Pritzker prize) and Eduardo Souto de Moura (winner of the 2011 Pritzker prize). Its modern heir is the Faculdade de Arquitectura (School of Architecture) of the University of Porto.

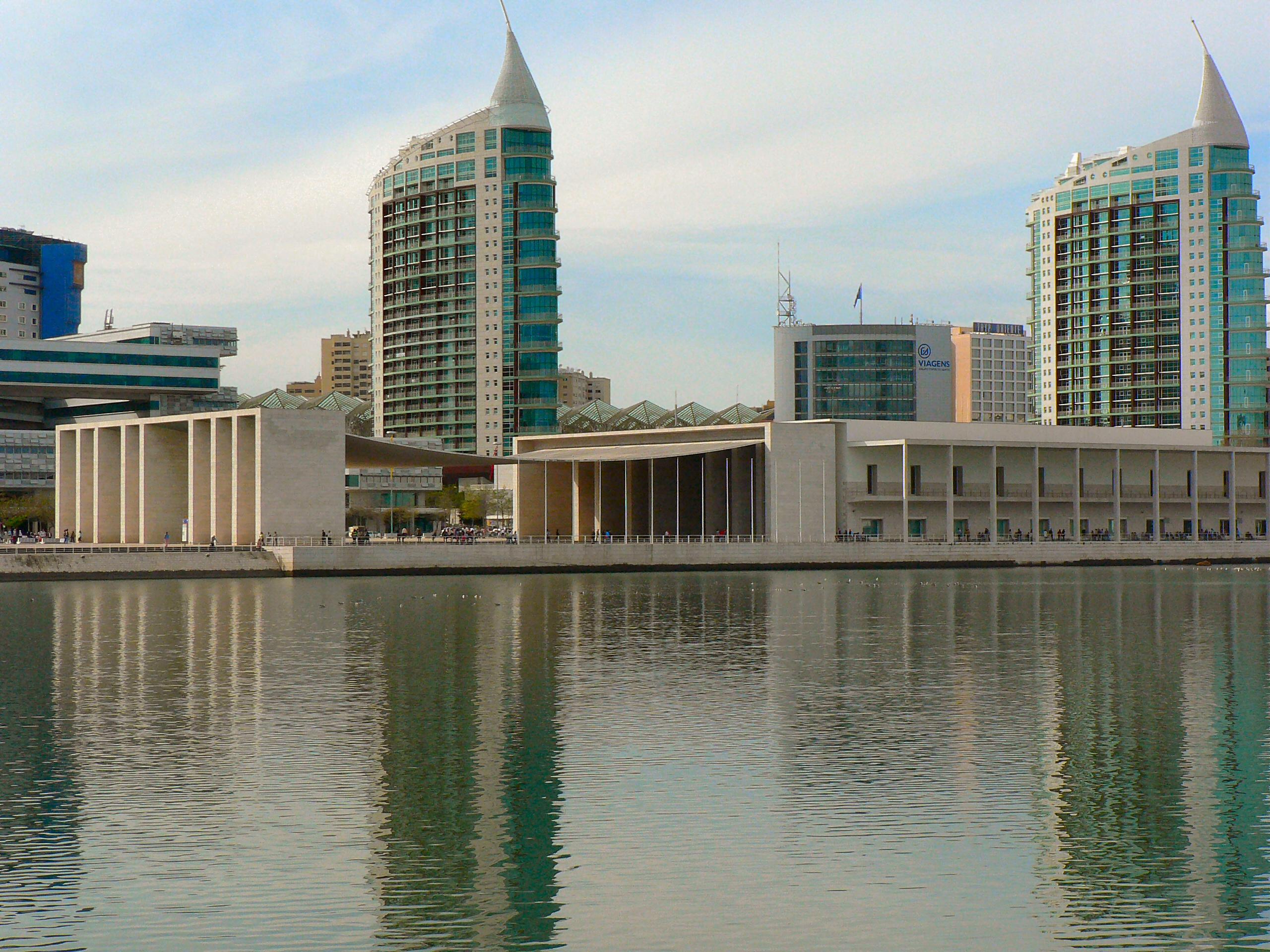
Parque das Nações, Lisbon

Although Portuguese architecture is usually associated with the internationally accredited Alvaro Siza, there are others equally responsible for the positive trends in current architecture. "Many Portuguese architects are sons of Siza, but Tavora is a grandfather to all of us". The influence of Sizas own teacher, Fernando Tavora, echoes across generations.

The Fundação Calouste Gulbenkian, built in 1960s and designed by Rui Atouguia, Pedro Cid, and Alberto Pessoa, is one of the best defining examples of 20th-century Portuguese architecture.

In Portugal Tomás Taveira is also noteworthy, particularly due to stadium design. Other renowned Portuguese architects include Pancho Guedes, Gonçalo Byrne and António Maria Braga.

Carrilho da Graça’s Centro de Documentação da Presidência da República (Documentation Archive of the President of the Portuguese Republic), is one of Lisbon's best-kept architectural secrets.

Contemporary Portuguese architects have increasingly achieved international recognition for their works. The Prize Europe 40 Under 40, created by The European Centre for Architecture Art Design and Urban Studies and The Chicago Athenaeum: Museum of Architecture and Design, have awarded Filipa Frois Almeida, Hugo Reis, Diogo Aguiar, Raulino Silva e Bruno André with the Europe 40 Under 40 Prize.

== Regional architecture ==
=== Azores Islands ===
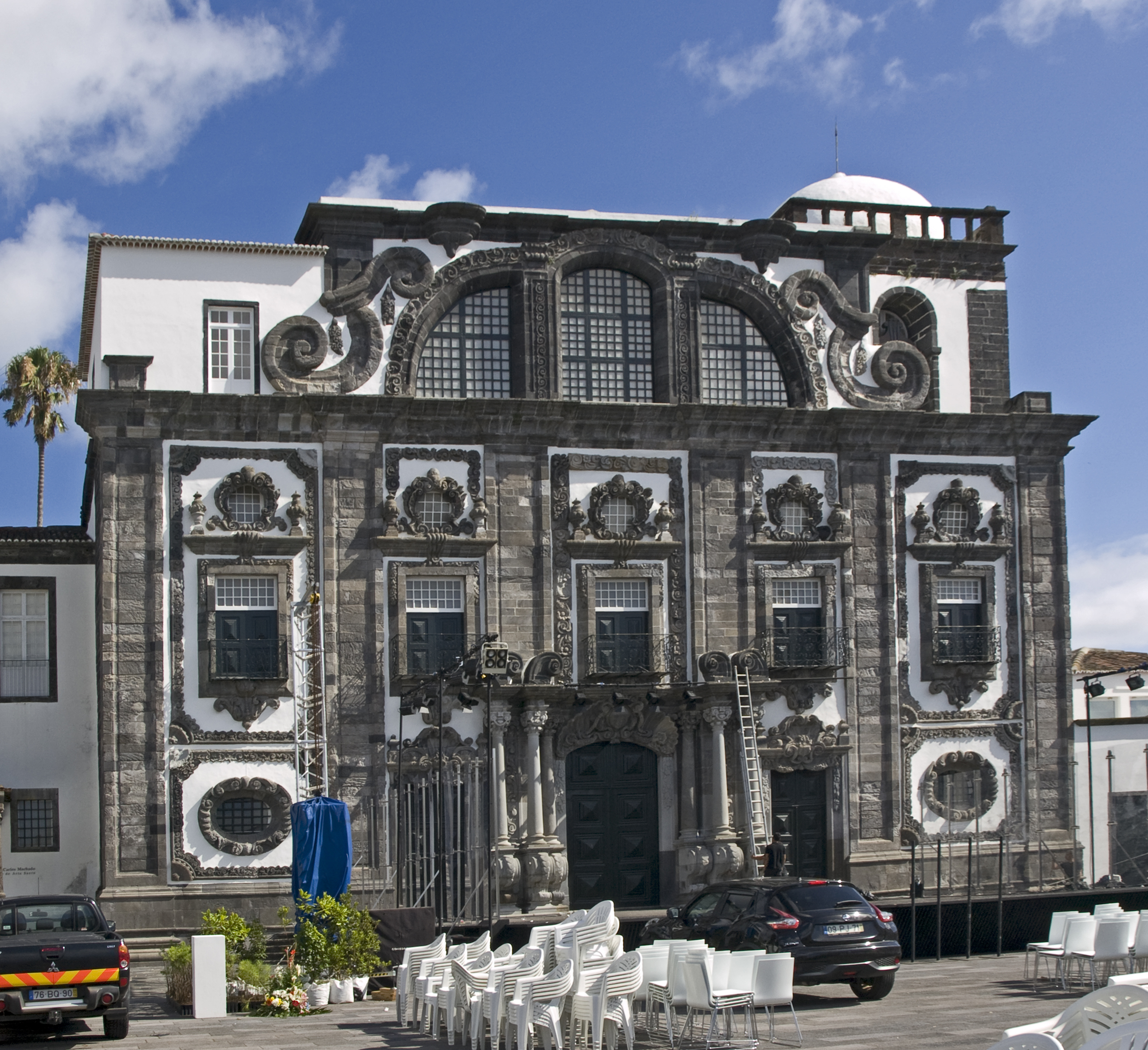
Jesuit College of Ponta Delgada

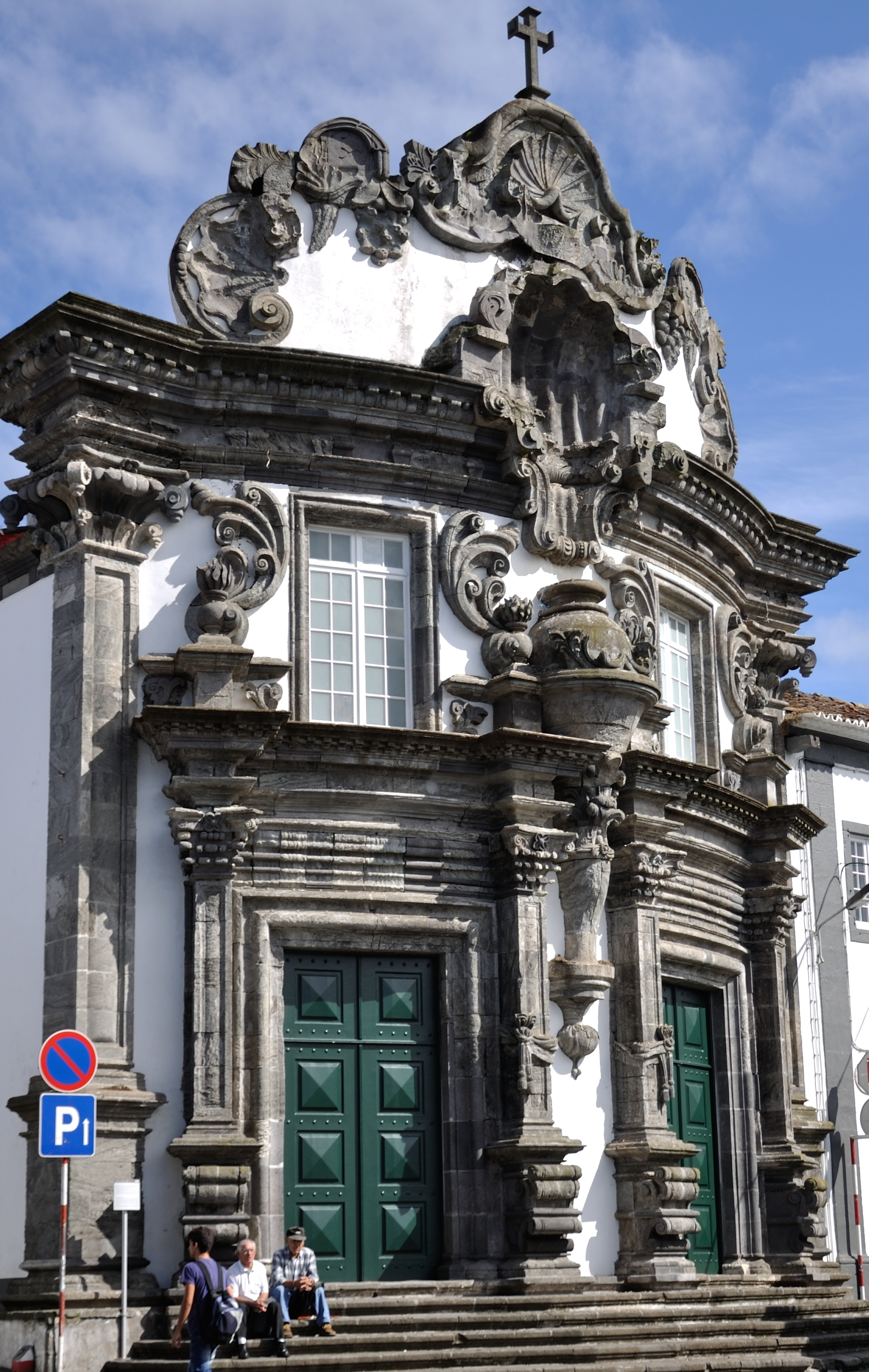
Igreja do Espírito Santo

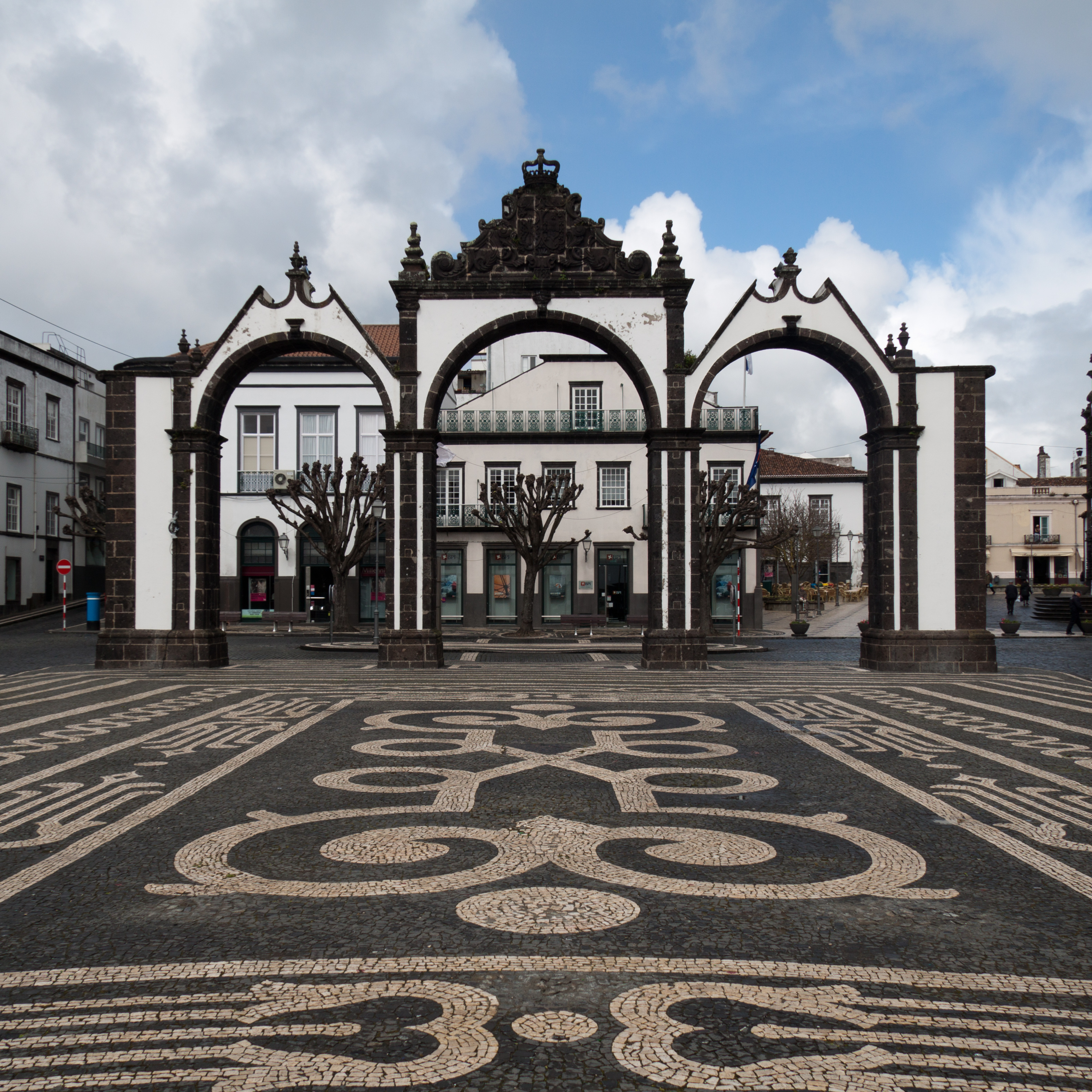
Ponta Delgada City Gates

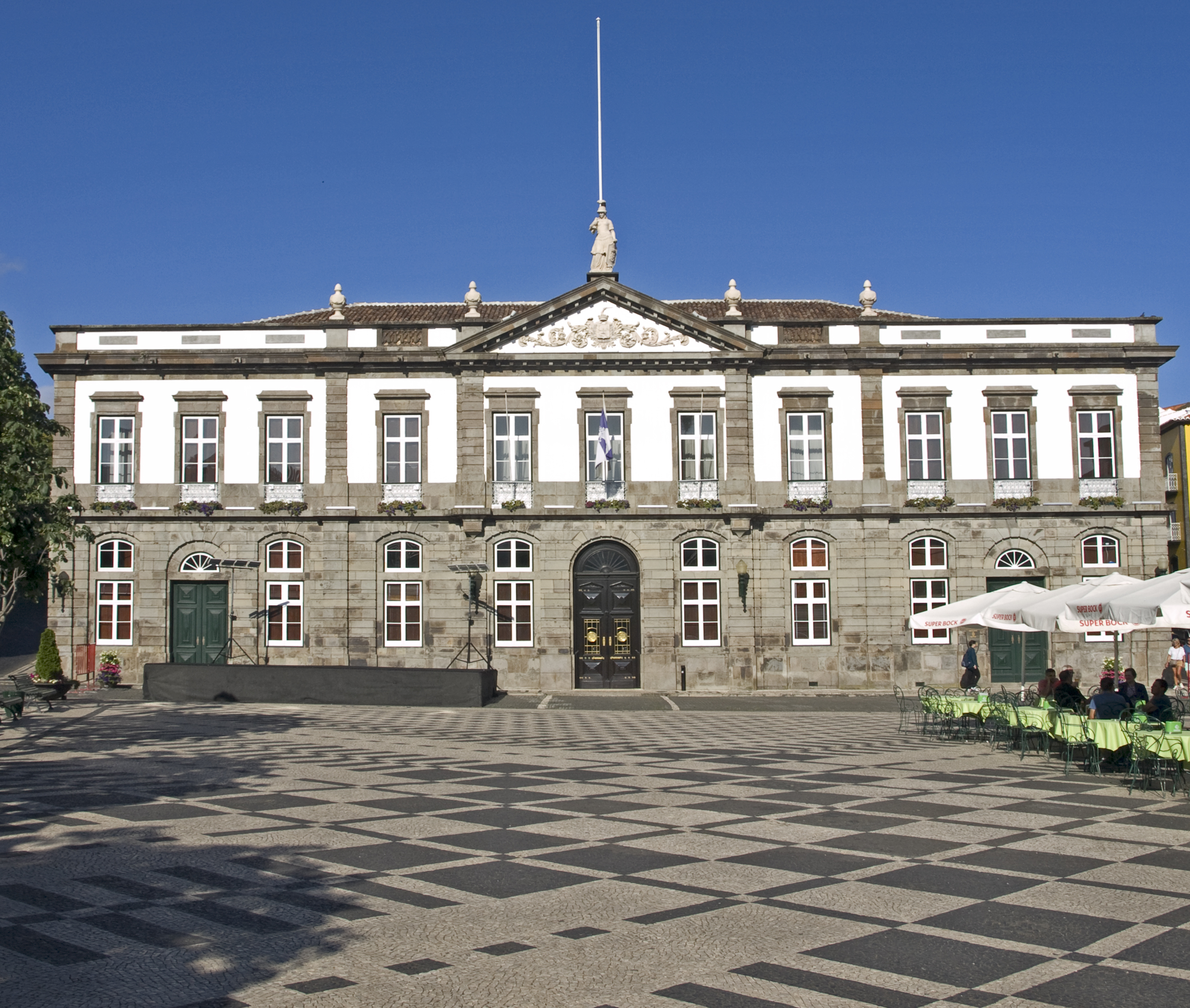
Angra do Heroísmo City Hall

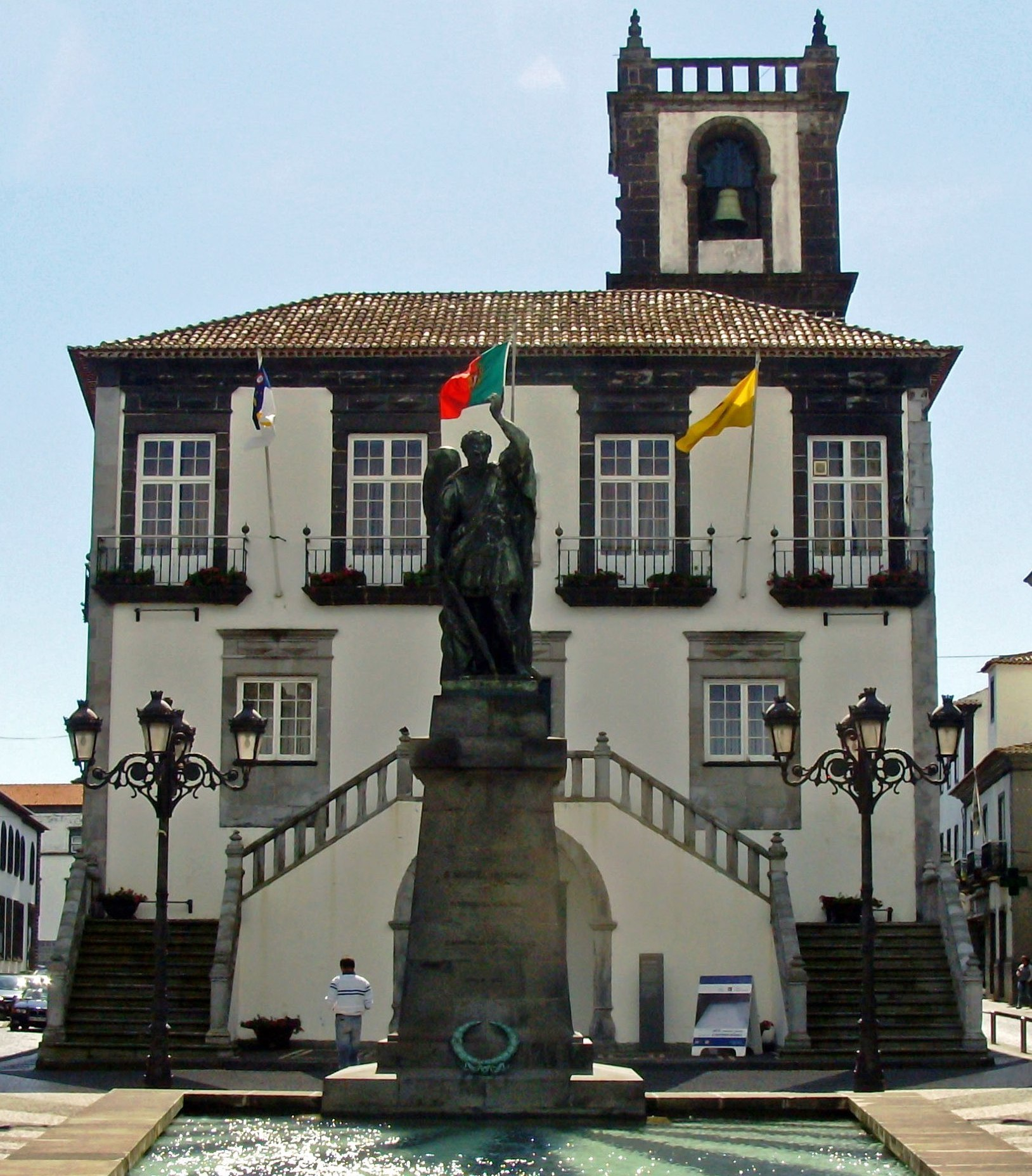
Ponta Delgada City Hall

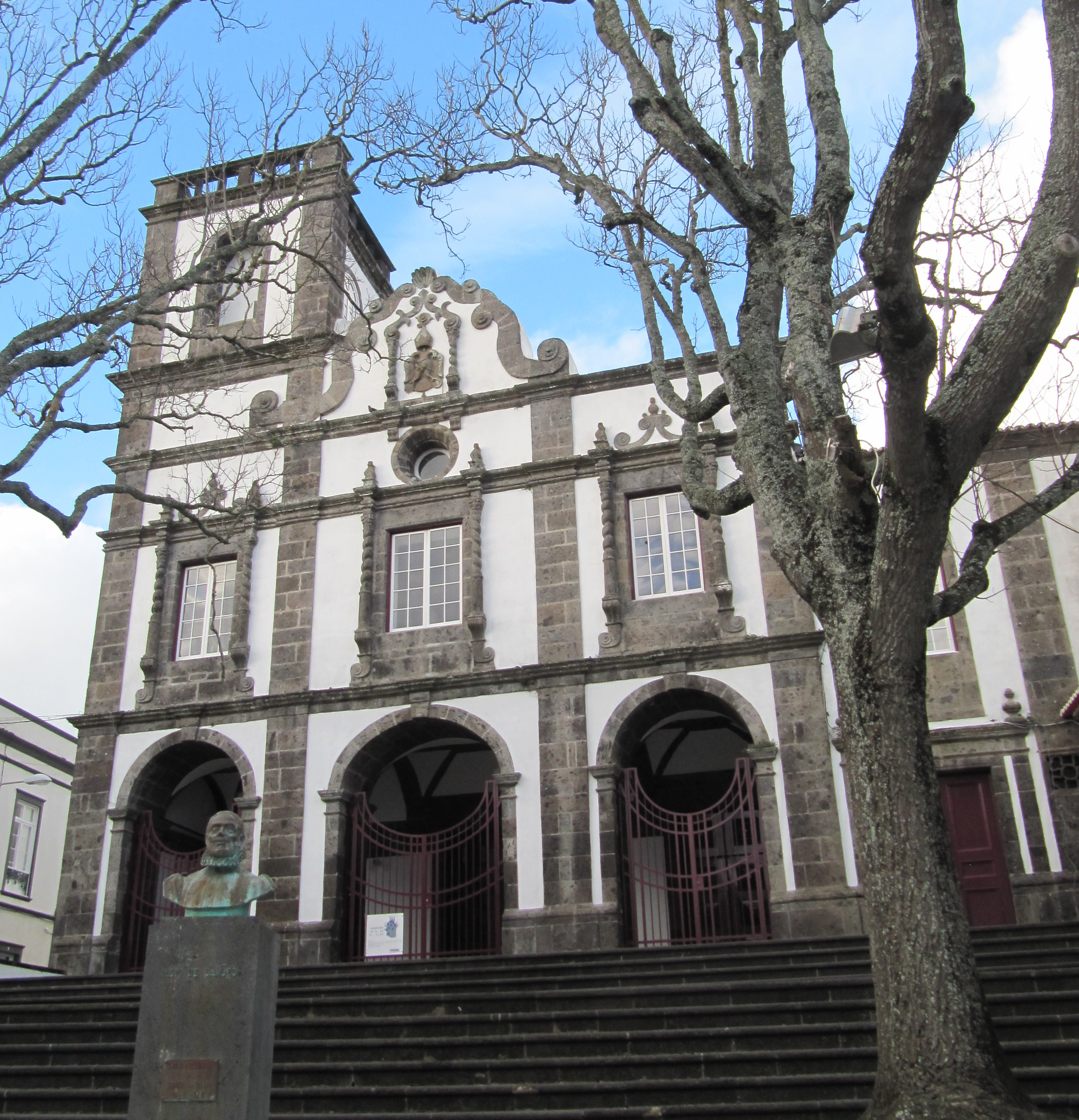
Academy of Arts of the Azores

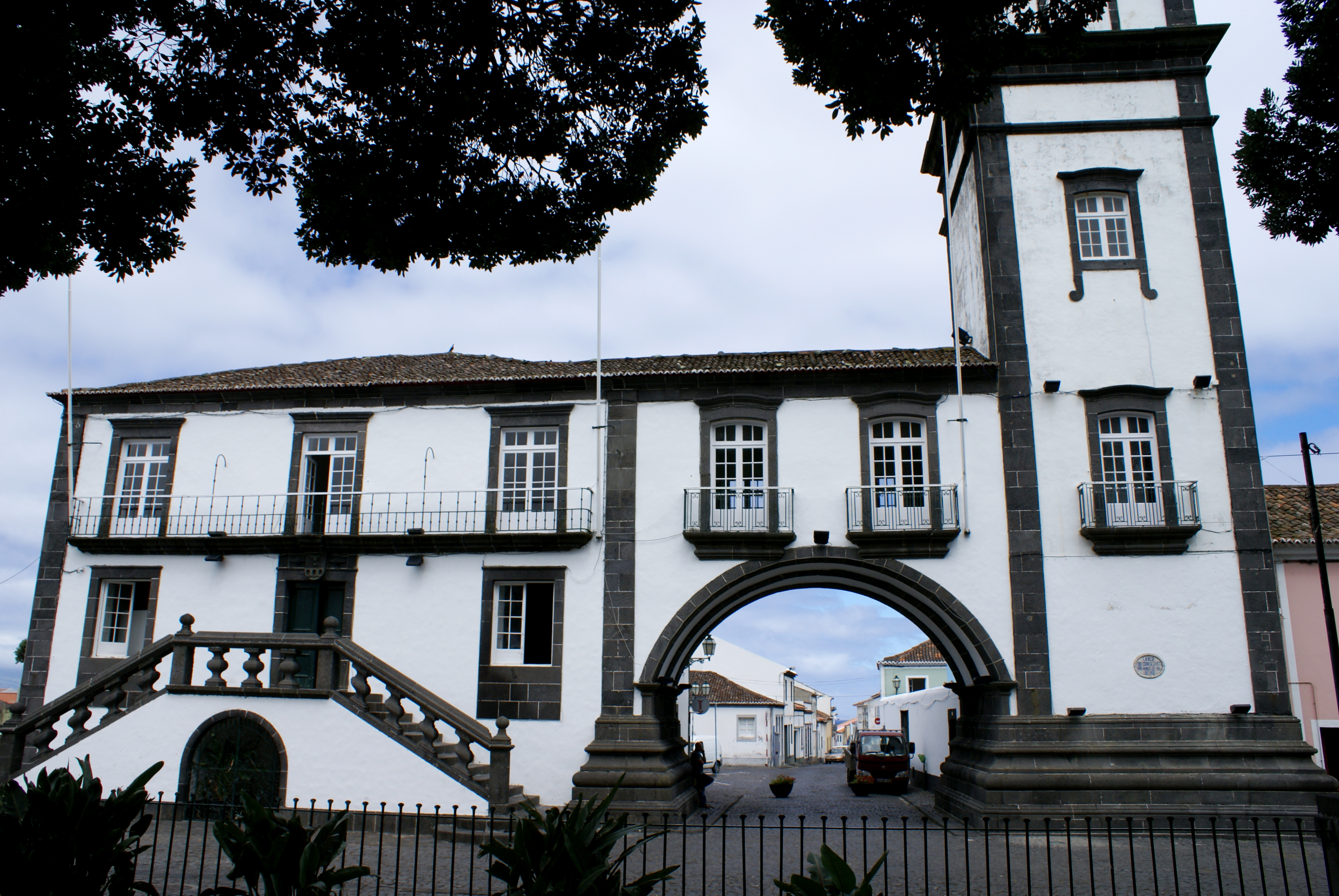
Town Hall of Ribeira Grande

=== Madeira and Porto Santo ===
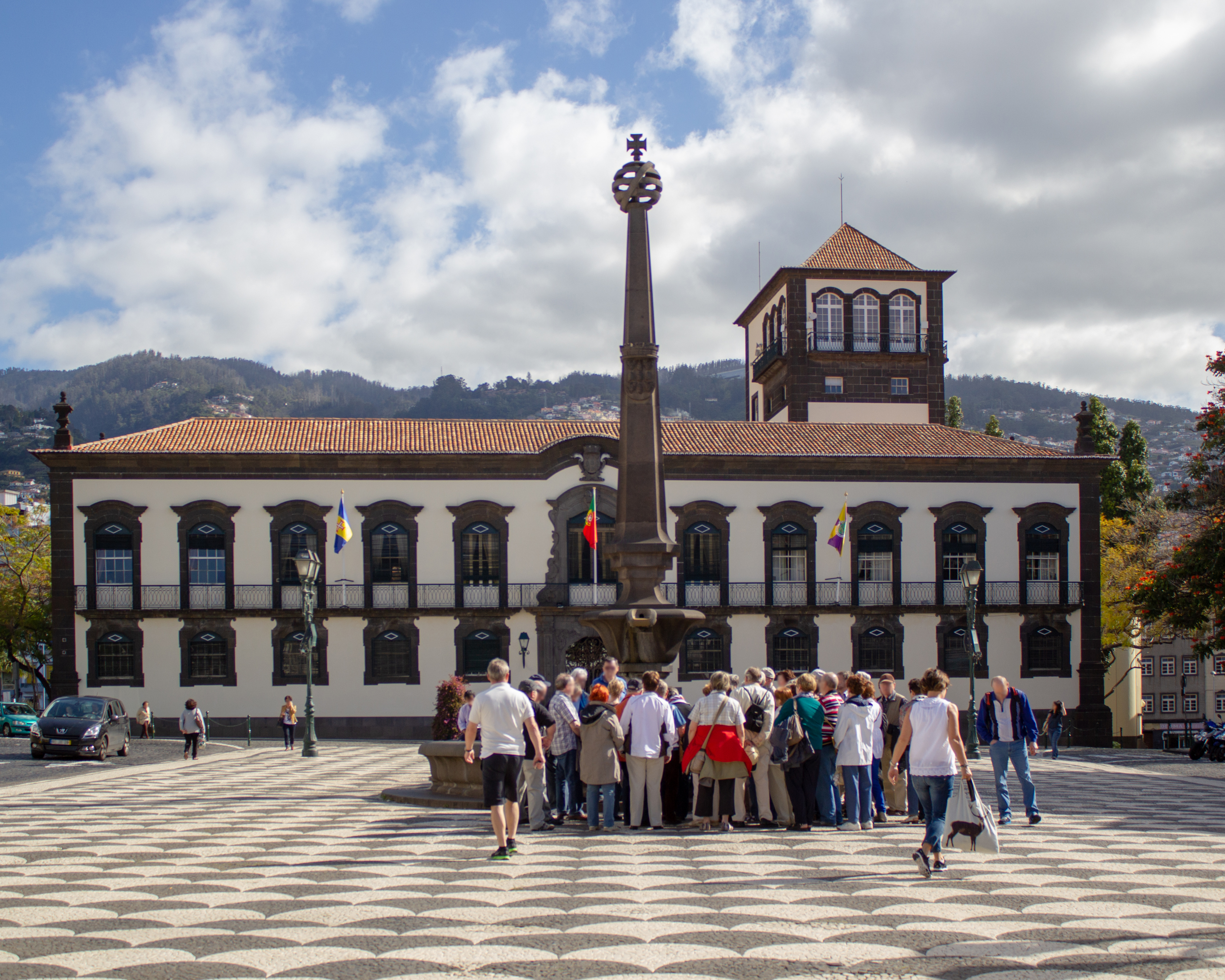
Funchal City Hall

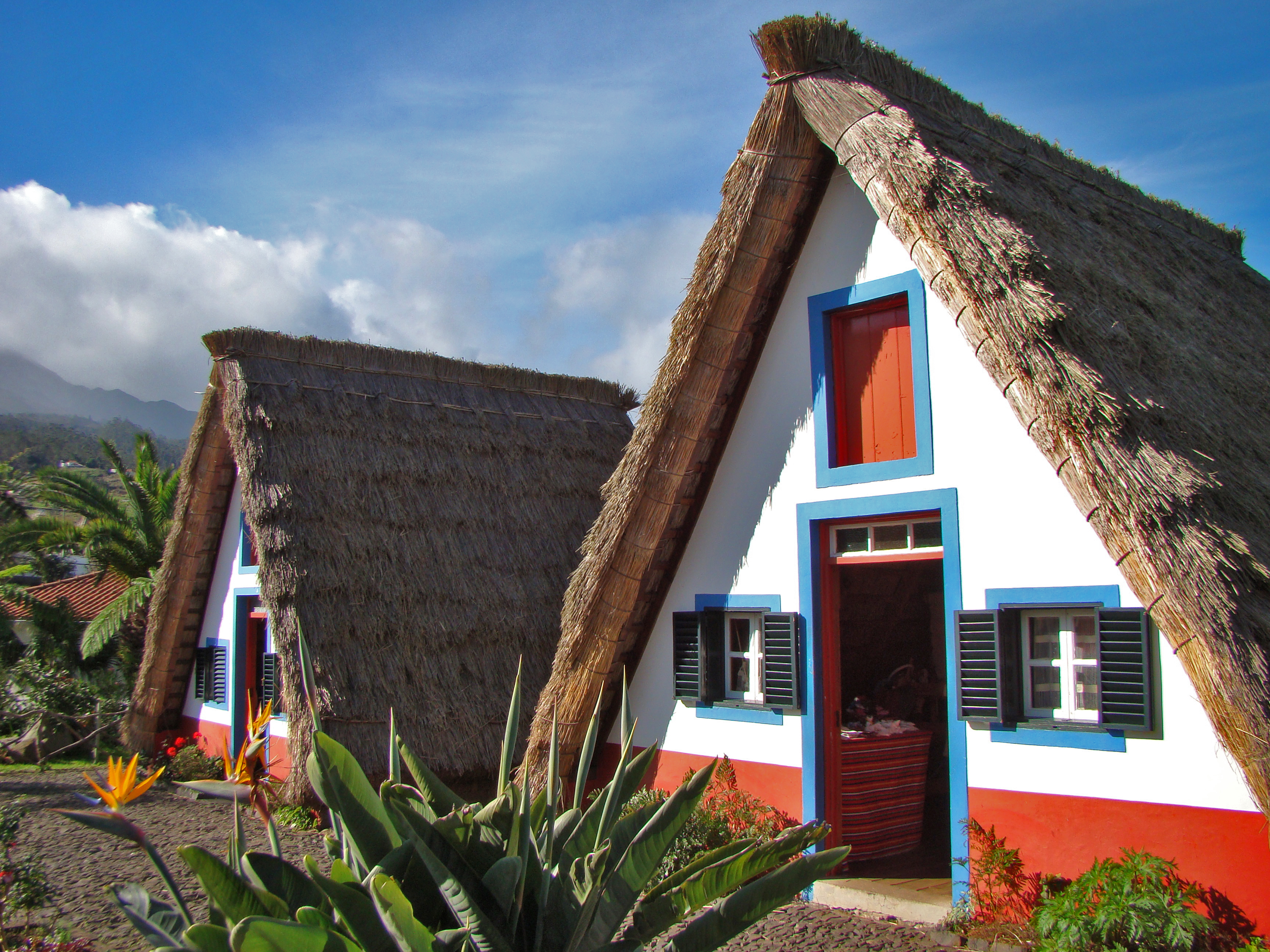
Typical thatch houses of Santana

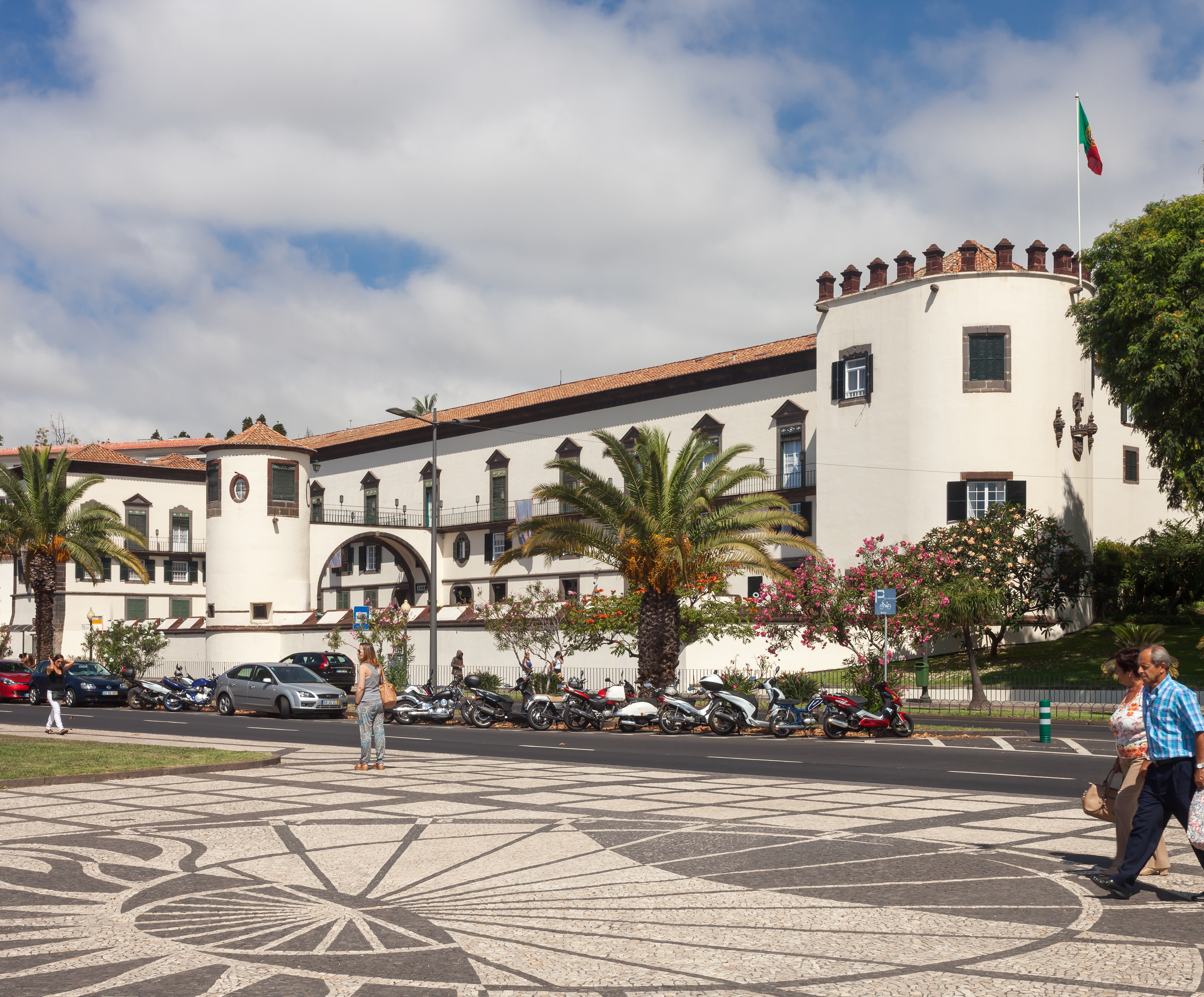
Palace Fortress of São Lourenço

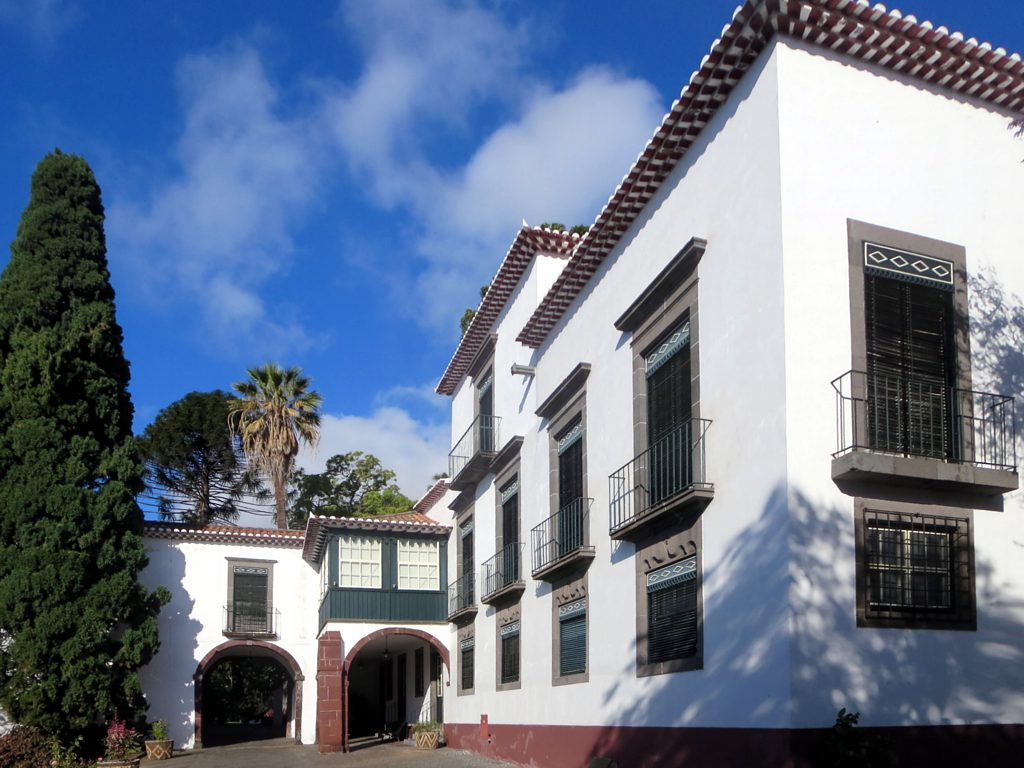
Museu Quinta das Cruzes

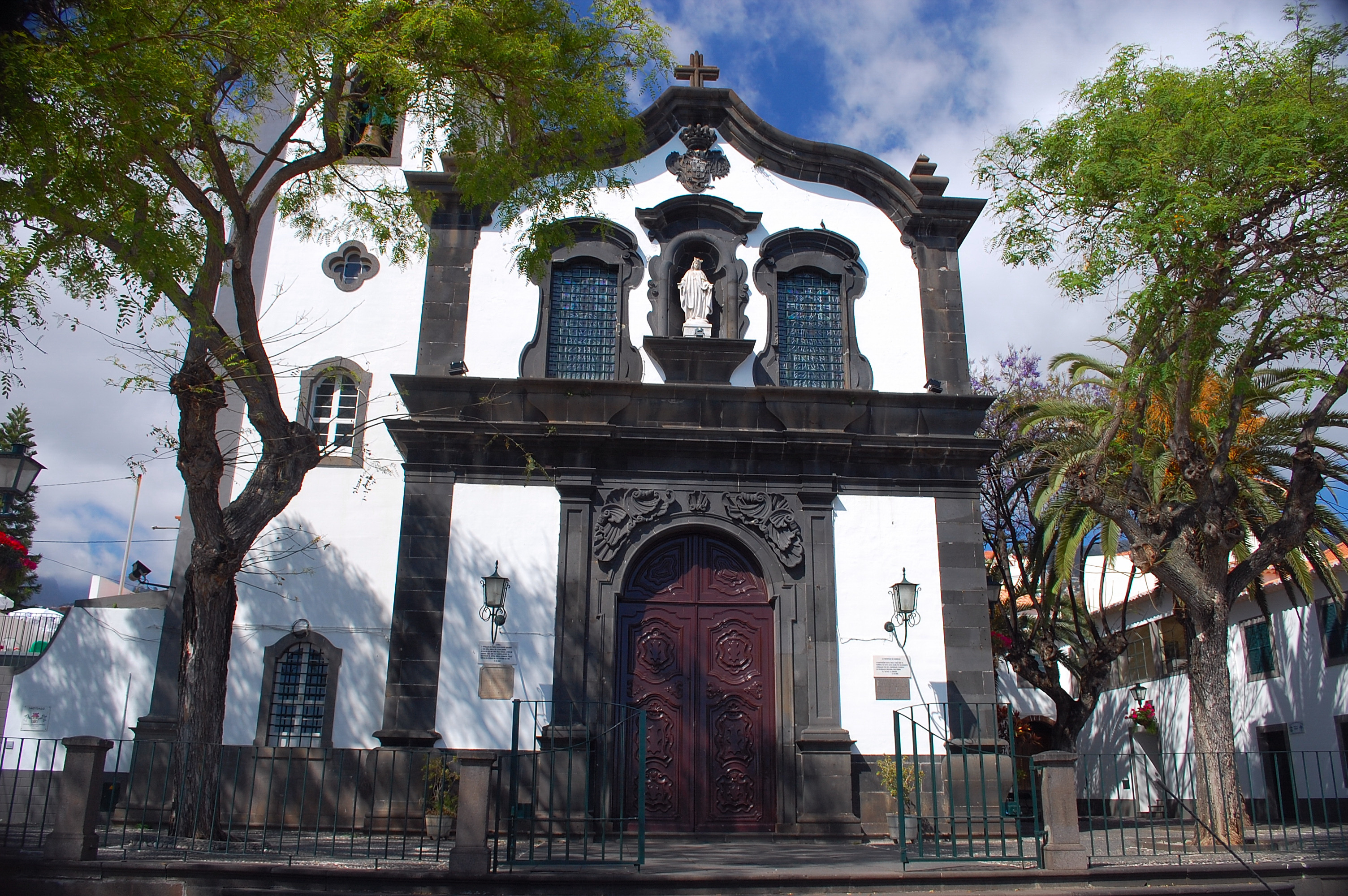
São Tiago Menor Church, Funchal

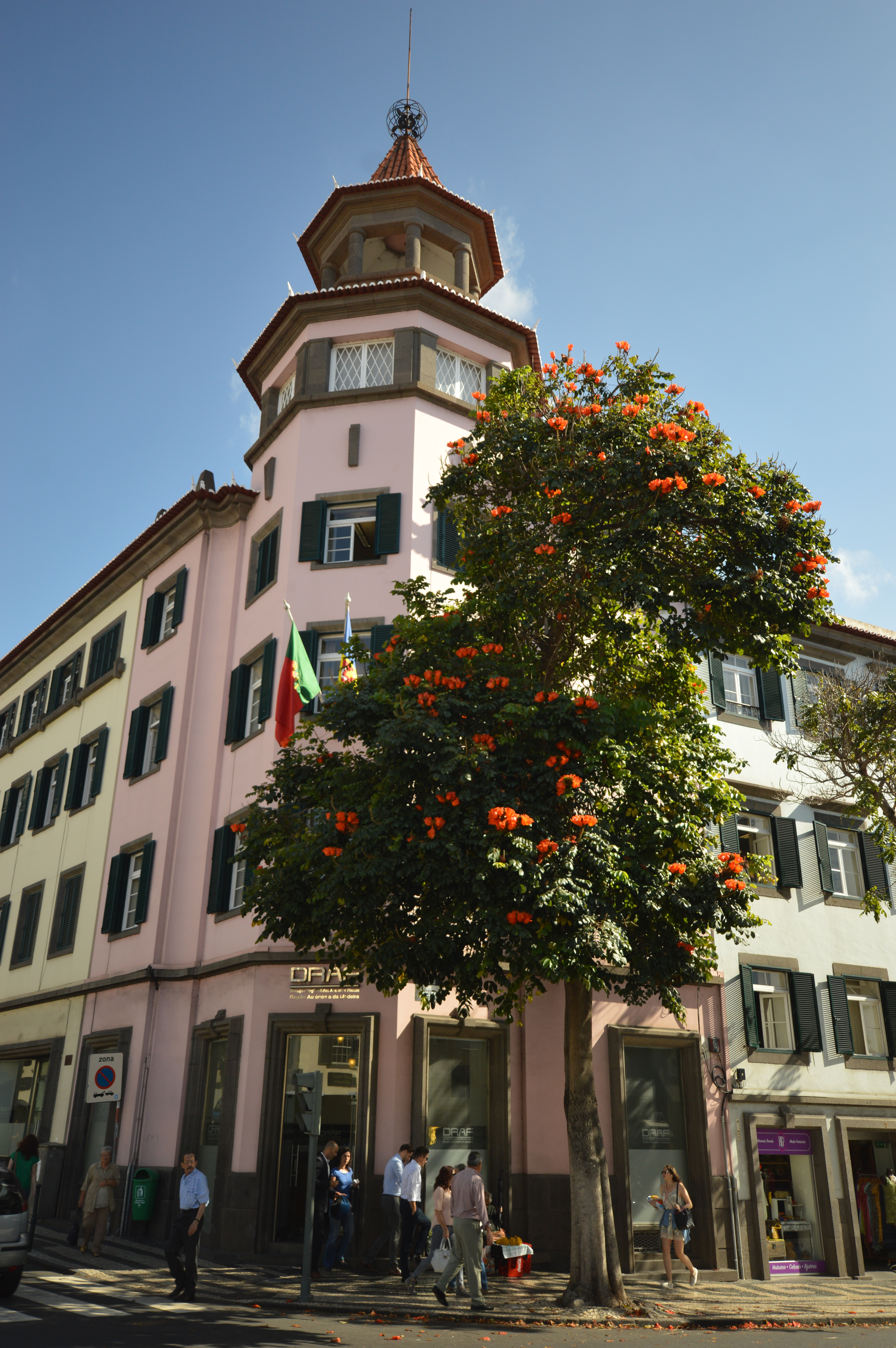
Largo do Phelps, Funchal

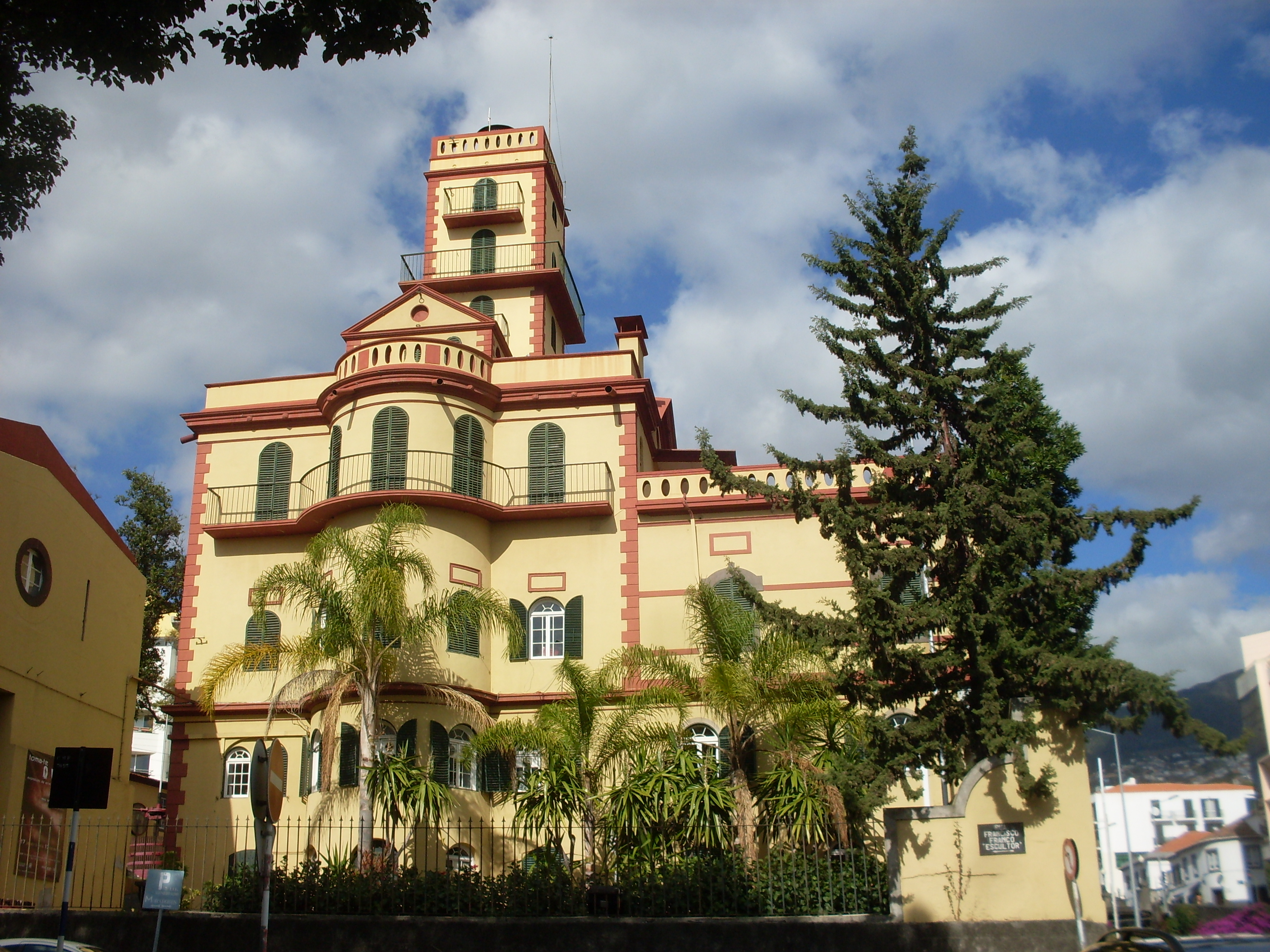
Institute of Madeira Wine

== See also ==
- Sino-Portuguese architecture
- Summer architecture
- Classification of Built Heritage in Portugal
- Portuguese pavement
- Seven Wonders of Portugal
- Seven Wonders of Portuguese Origin in the World
- Rafael Manzano Prize
