= Benedetto da Ravenna =

Italian military engineer (16th century)

Benedetto da Ravenna (c. 1485–1556) was an Italian military engineer known for his work for John III of Portugal.

After having served in the artillery under Pedro Navarro at Tripoli in 1510, Ravenna travelled to Spain in 1517, later serving under Gabriele Tadino at the Siege of Rhodes in 1522.

In 1533 and 1534 Ravenna had travelled around the coasts and frontiers of Spain and had drawn up a report setting out the works needed "to the most important forts and towns on the frontiers".

Ravenna then participated in the expedition to Tunis in 1535, as had Lourenço Pires de Távora, the latter serving under the Infante Luís. (Note: The source does not make clear whether Ravenna and Pires de Távora actually met. (Elbl, 2013, p. 247.))

In 1541, John III of Portugal requested the urgent services of Ravenna, then based at Gibraltar, as chief military engineer to Charles V (Charles I of Spain), who "loaned" the engineer to his cousin. Between 1541 and 1542 Ravenna collaborated with Miguel de Arruda, (Note: Arruda has been considered as representing the "transition from the earlier design mindset of Benedetto da Ravenna's generation to that of the later sixteenth century". (Elbl, 2013, p. 641.)) and the Spanish-Portuguese master builder and architect João de Castilho, and Diogo de Torralva, on the Portuguese fortress at Mazagan, the present-day Moroccan port-city of El Jadida, which was the first Portuguese fortified site with angular bastions. Arruda later made key alterations to Da Ravenna's initial 1541 design of the Royal Walls at Ceuta, especially to the bastions on the western front.

Ravenna also worked on the Castle of Vila Viçosa.
