= Miguel de Arruda =

Portuguese architect (16th century)

Miguel de Arruda (fl. 1532–1563) was a Portuguese mestre de obras, architect and military engineer. He was the son of Francisco de Arruda and nephew of Diogo de Arruda, both famed Portuguese architects.

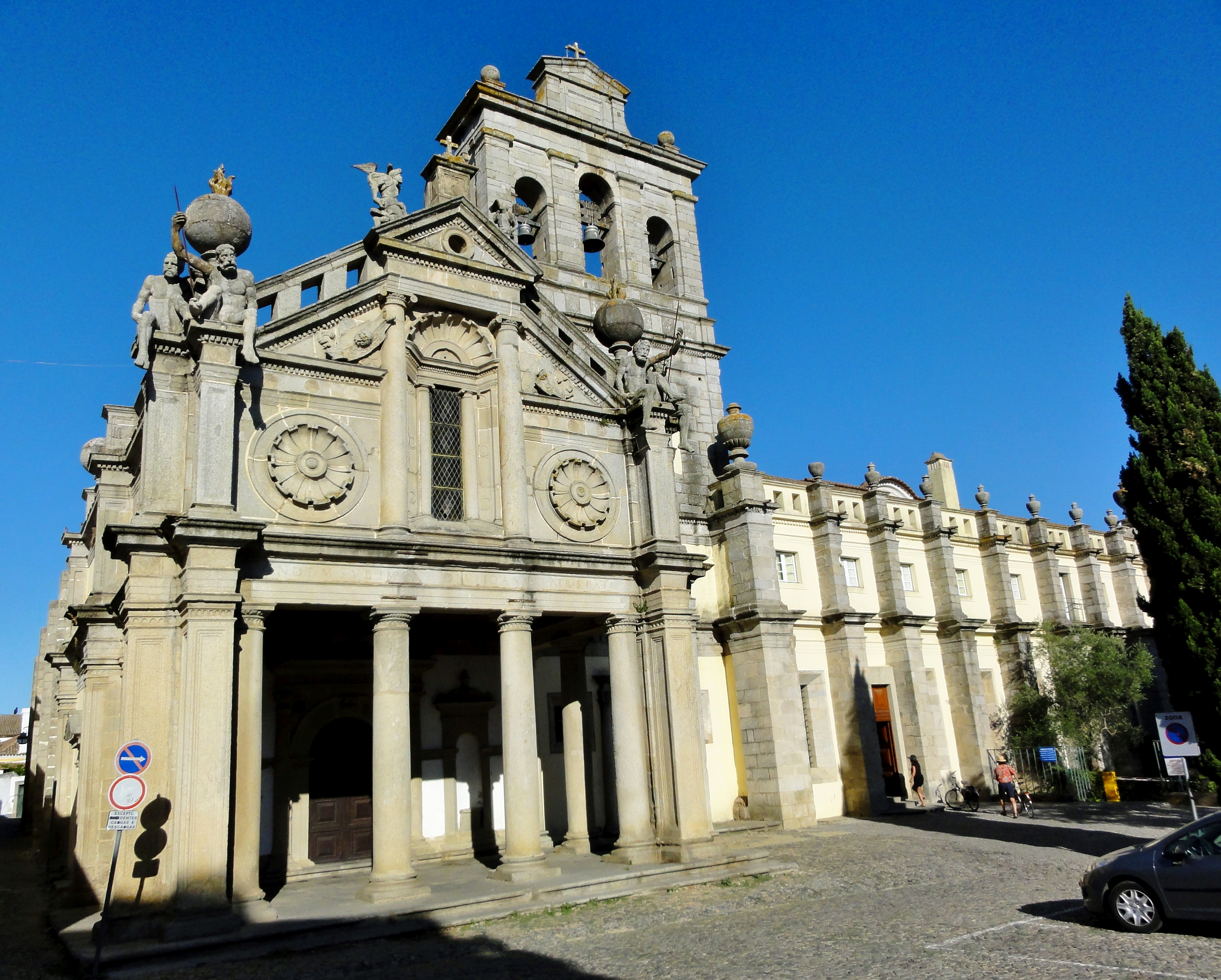
Convento da Graça, Évora

Towards the end of the first third of the 16th century Miguel de Arruda was directing the works to expand the existing convent of the Order of Saint Augustine at Évora; by 1540 the new church, the Church of Nossa Senhora da Graça, was already being used as a place of worship.

In 1532 he took over from João de Castilho as mestre de obras at Alcobaça Monastery. (Note: Castilho, known in Spanish as Juan de Castillo, was a Spanish-born Portuguese master builder. He had been in charge of the works at Alcobaça since 1519, having started working in Portugal in 1515. (González 1991)) Around that time, Arruda built the main entrance to the Convent of Christ (Tomar) following the design by Castilho.

In 1533 John III appointed him mestre de obras at Batalha Monastery, where Castilho had been working on repairs to the royal pantheon since 1528. which included expanding the convent to the east, with two new cloisters and a gatehouse.

Between 1541 and 1542 Arruda was one of the architects, together with the Spanish-Portuguese master builder and architect João de Castilho and Diogo de Torralva, who were later joined by the Italian engineer Benedetto da Ravenna, and who worked on the Portuguese fortress at Mazagan, the present-day Moroccan port-city of El Jadida, and which was the first Portuguese fortified site with angular bastions. Indeed, Arruda has been considered as representing the "transition from the earlier design mindset of Benedetto da Ravenna's generation to that of the later sixteenth century", and in the case of the Royal Walls at Ceuta, Arruda made key alterations to Da Ravenna's initial 1541 design, especially to the bastions on the western front.

In 1543 Arruda was appointed the King's Master of Works and the following year João de Castro visited Arruda at Ceuta, where he was working on a project to fortify its walls. Castro, on returning from his first voyage to the Indies, had been ordered by the King to contact Arruda regarding the project of fortification. Following their collaboration, Arruda spoke highly of Castro to the humanist clergyman André de Resende, who was then inspired to collaborate with Castro.

In August 1545 Castro wrote to the King from the Island of Mozambique advocating the construction of a new fortress there, capable of withstanding the threat of Turkish artillery. The King replied the following year, informing him that he had entrusted the project to Arruda.

In 1548/49, the King appointed Arruda to the newly created post of "Master of the Works on the Walls and Fortifications of the Kingdom, Places in Além (Africa) and India" and, that same year, together with Diogo Telles, Arruda was inspecting Tangier's defences, and ensuring that the mestre there, André Rodrigues, implemented some of the alterations made earlier at Ceuta.

In 1549 he was sent to Ksar el-Kebir to build the Seinal Fort.

In 1550, Arruda designed and completed the works on the main entrance to Our Lady of the Assumption Cathedral, Elvas. The construction of the building itself, which commenced in 1517, is attributed to his father, Francisco de Arruda.

Miguel de Arruda also designed the Fort of São Julião da Barra, which would become Portugal's largest and most complete military defence complex and, since the mid-20th century, the headquarters of Portugal's Ministry of Defence, construction of which started some time between 1553 and 1556.
