= Manueline =

16th-century Portuguese architectural style

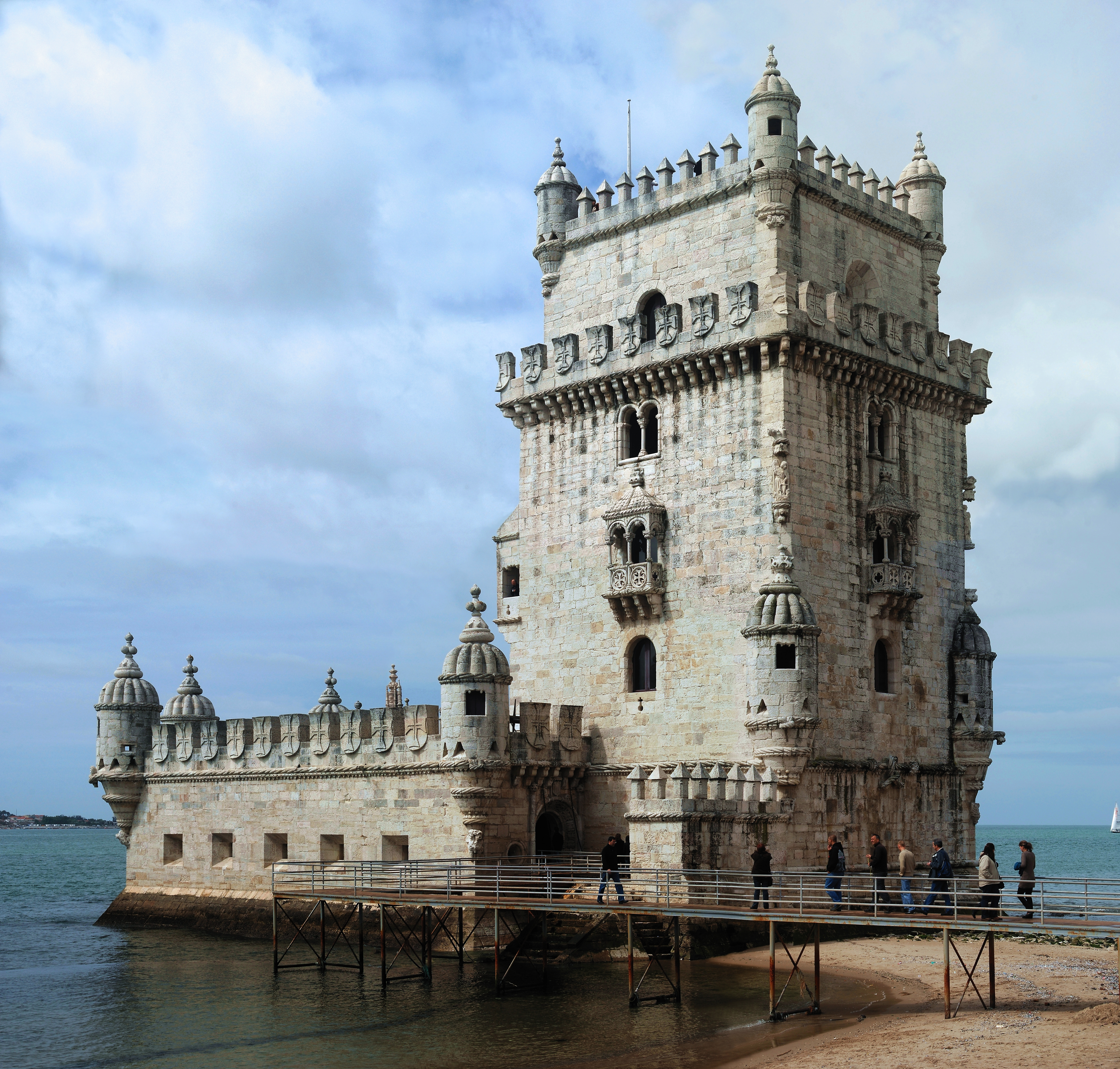
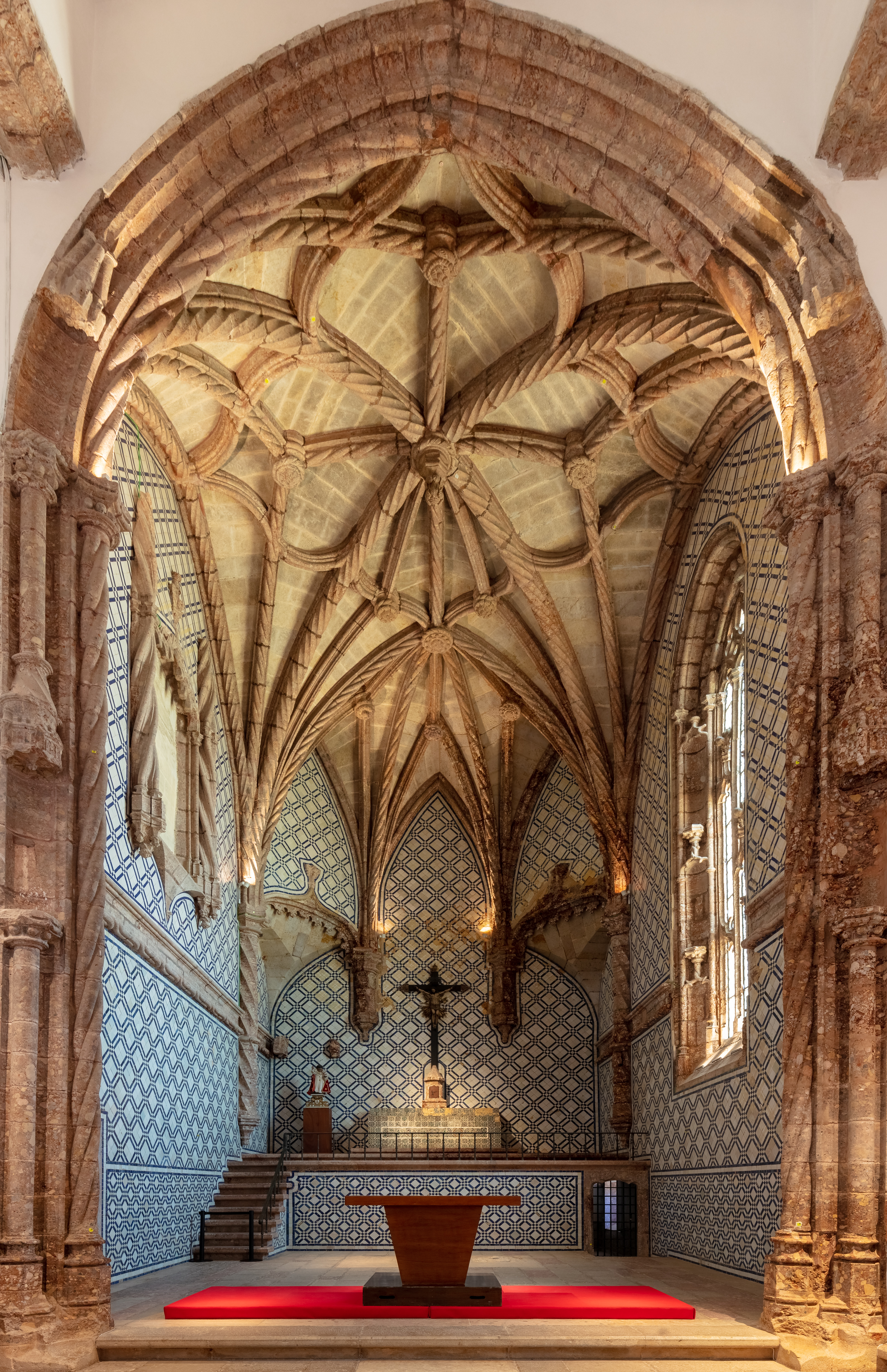
- Top to bottom: Belém Tower in Lisbon (1514–1519); Chapel of São Miguel at the University of Coimbra in Coimbra (1517-1522); and the altar of the church of the Monastery of Jesus of Setúbal in Setúbal (1491-1495)
- Years active: c. 1490s-1520s
- Location: Europe, the Americas, Africa and Asia

The Manueline (Portuguese: estilo manuelino, IPA: [ɨʃˈtilu mɐnweˈlinu]), occasionally known as Portuguese late Gothic, is the sumptuous, composite Portuguese architectural style originating in the 16th century, during the Portuguese Renaissance and Age of Discoveries. Manueline architecture incorporates maritime elements and representations of the discoveries brought from the voyages of Vasco da Gama and Pedro Álvares Cabral. This innovative style synthesizes aspects of Late Gothic Flamboyant architecture with original motifs and influences of the Plateresque, Mudéjar, Italian, and Flemish architecture. It marks the transition from Late Gothic to Renaissance. The construction of churches and monasteries in Manueline was largely financed by proceeds of the lucrative spice trade with Africa and India.

The style was given its name, many years later, by Francisco Adolfo de Varnhagen, Viscount of Porto Seguro, in his 1842 book Noticia historica e descriptiva do Mosteiro de Belem, com um glossario de varios termos respectivos principalmente a architectura gothica, in his description of the Jerónimos Monastery. Varnhagen named the style after King Manuel I, whose reign (1495–1521) coincided with its development. The style was much influenced by the astonishing successes of the voyages of discovery of Portuguese navigators, from the coastal areas of Africa to the discovery of Brazil and the ocean routes to the Far East.

Although the period of this style did not last long (from 1490 to 1520), it played an important part in the development of Portuguese art. The influence of the style outlived the king. Celebrating the newly maritime power, it manifested itself in architecture (churches, monasteries, palaces, castles) and extended into other arts such as sculpture, painting, works of art made of precious metals, faience and furniture.

== Characteristics ==
The window of the Convent of Christ in Tomar is a well-known example of Manueline style which exhibits its typical characteristics.

This decorative style is characterized by virtuoso complex ornamentation in portals, windows, columns and arcades. In its end period, it tended to become excessively exuberant as in Tomar.

Several elements appear regularly in these intricately carved stoneworks:

- elements used on ships: the armillary sphere (a navigational instrument and the personal emblem of Manuel I and also a symbol of the cosmos), spheres, anchors, anchor chains, ropes and cables.
- elements from the sea, such as shells, pearls and strings of seaweed.
- botanical motifs such as laurel branches, oak leaves, acorns, poppy capsules, corncobs, and thistles.
- symbols of Christianity such as the cross of the Order of Christ (former Knights Templar), the military order that played a prominent role and helped finance the first voyages of discovery. The cross of this order decorated the sails of the Portuguese ships.
- elements from newly discovered lands (such as the tracery in the Royal Cloister of the Batalha Monastery, suggesting Islamic filigree work, influenced by buildings in India)
- columns carved like twisted strands of rope
- semicircular arches (instead of Gothic pointed arches) of doors and windows, sometimes consisting of three or more convex curves
- multiple pillars
- eight-sided capitals
- lack of symmetry
- conical pinnacles
- bevelled crenellations
- ornate portals with niches or canopies.

== Examples ==
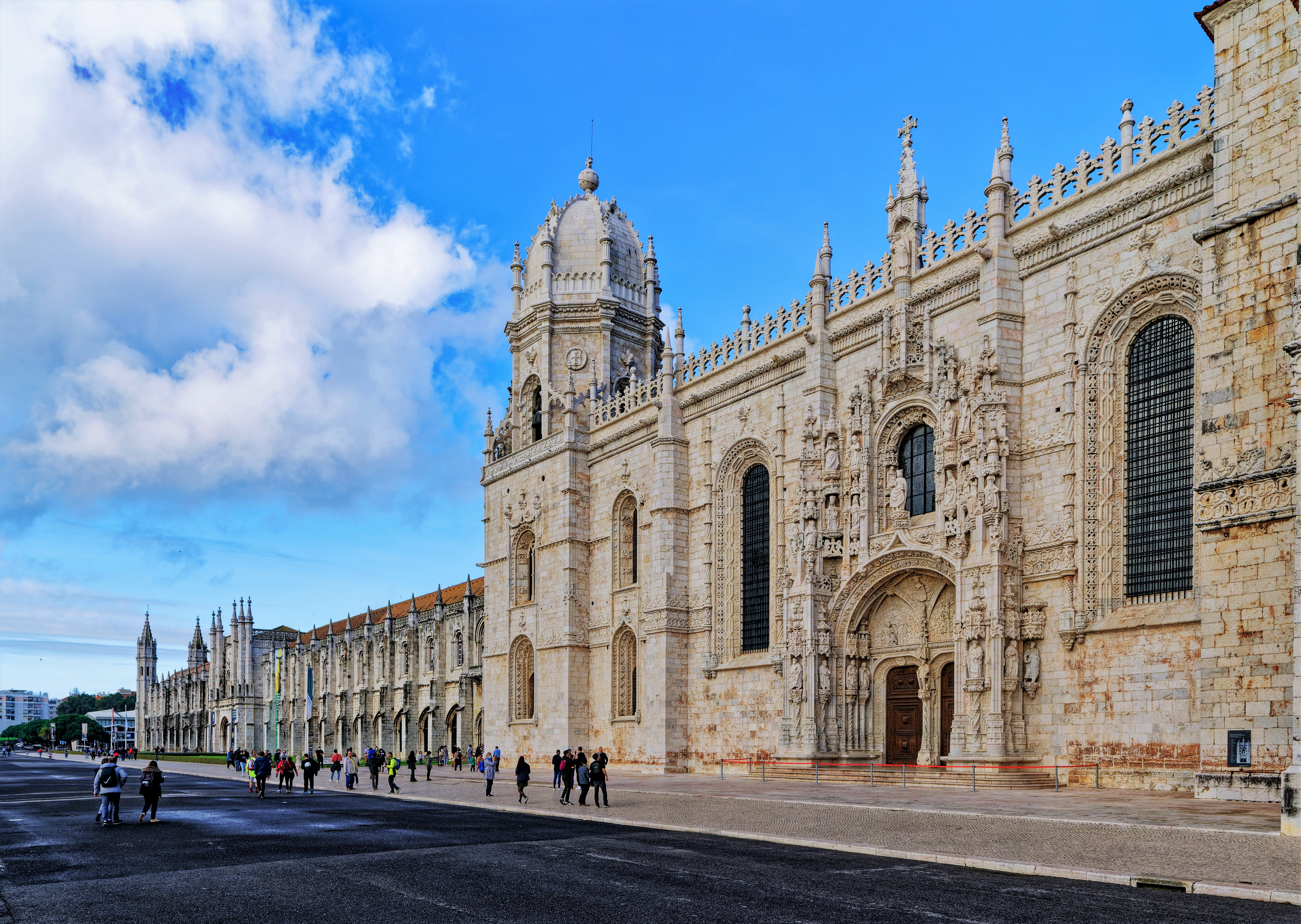
Manueline exterior of the Hieronymites Monastery in Lisbon, the dome, a later 19th century addition, is an example of Neo-Manueline style.

When King Manuel I died in 1521, he funded 62 construction projects. However, much original Manueline architecture in Portugal was lost or damaged beyond restoration in the 1755 Lisbon earthquake and subsequent tsunami. In Lisbon, the Ribeira Palace, the residence of King Manuel I, and the Hospital Real de Todos os Santos were destroyed, along with several churches. The city, however, still has outstanding examples of the style in the Jerónimos Monastery (mainly designed by Diogo Boitac and João de Castilho) and in the small fortress of the Belém Tower (designed by Francisco de Arruda). Both are located close to each other in the Belém neighbourhood. The portal of the Church of Nossa Senhora da Conceição Velha, in downtown Lisbon, has also survived destruction.

Outside Lisbon, the church and chapter house of the Convent of Christ at Tomar (designed by Diogo de Arruda) is a Manueline monument. In particular, the large window of the chapter house, with its sculptured organic and twisted rope forms, is an extraordinary achievement of the Manueline style.

Other major Manueline monuments include the arcade screens of the Royal Cloister (designed by Diogo Boitac) and the Unfinished Chapels (designed by Mateus Fernandes) at the Monastery of Batalha and the Royal Palace of Sintra.

Other remarkable Manueline buildings include the church of the Monastery of Jesus of Setúbal (one of the earliest Manueline churches, also designed by Diogo Boitac), the Santa Cruz Monastery in Coimbra, the main churches in Golegã, Vila do Conde, Moura, Caminha, Olivença and portions of the cathedrals of Braga (main chapel), Viseu (rib vaulting of the nave) and Guarda (main portal, pillars, vaulting). Civil buildings in Manueline style exist in Évora (home to the Évora Royal Palace of 1525, by Pedro de Trillo, Diogo de Arruda and Francisco de Arruda) and the Castle of Évoramonte of 1531), Viana do Castelo, Guimarães and some other towns.

The style was extended to the decorative arts and spread throughout the Portuguese Empire, to the islands of the Azores, Madeira, enclaves in North Africa, Brazil, Goa in Portuguese India and even Macau, China. Its influence is apparent in southern Spain, the Canary Islands, North Africa and the former Spanish colonies of Peru and Mexico.

== Famous Manueline artists ==
=== Architects ===
- Diogo Boitac
- Mateus Fernandes
- Diogo de Arruda
- Francisco de Arruda
- João de Castilho

=== Painters ===
- Vasco Fernandes
- Jorge Afonso
- Cristóvão de Figueiredo
- Garcia Fernandes
- Gregório Lopes

== Gallery ==
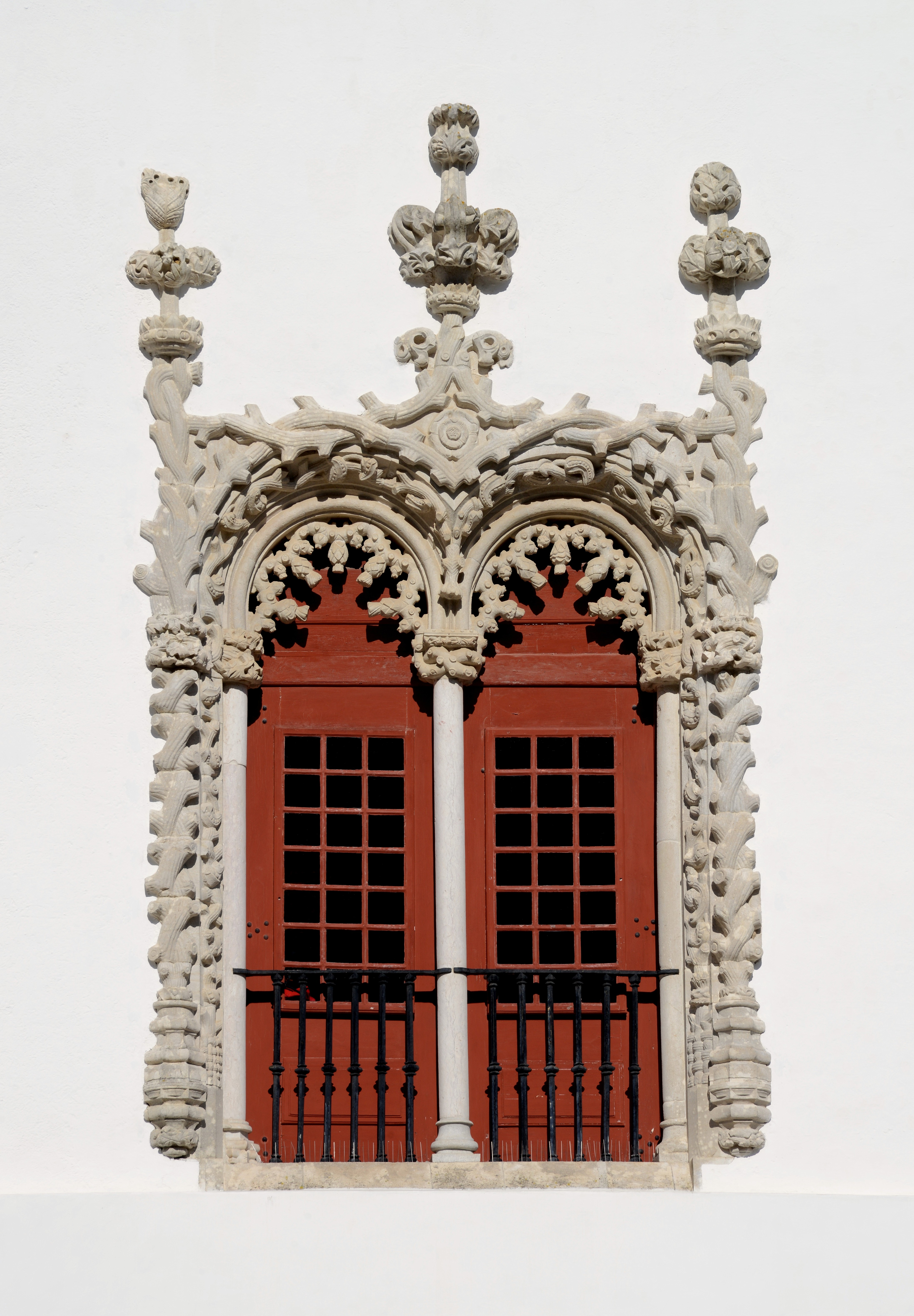
Windowframe at the royal palace of Sintra

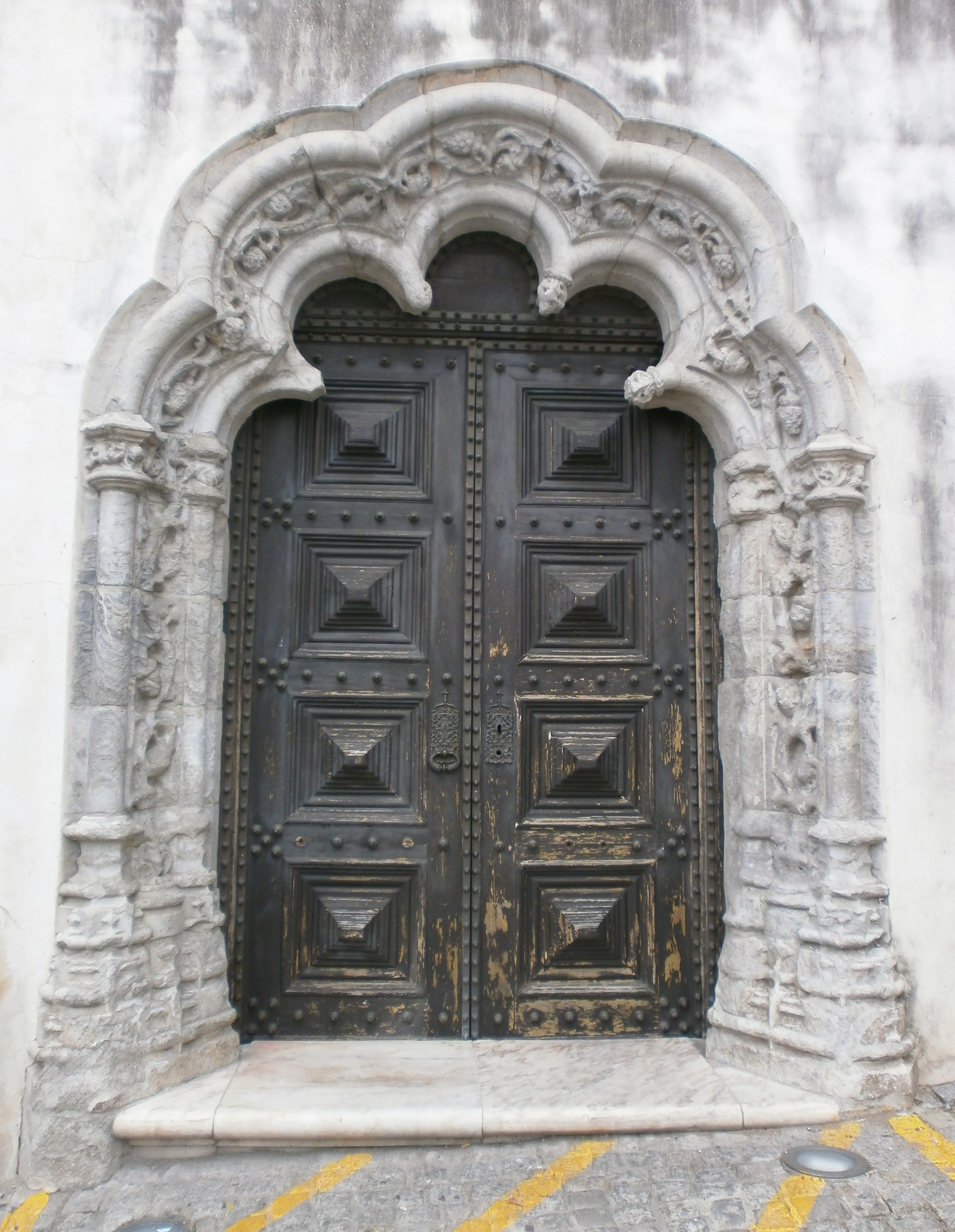
Doorframe in a church in Elvas

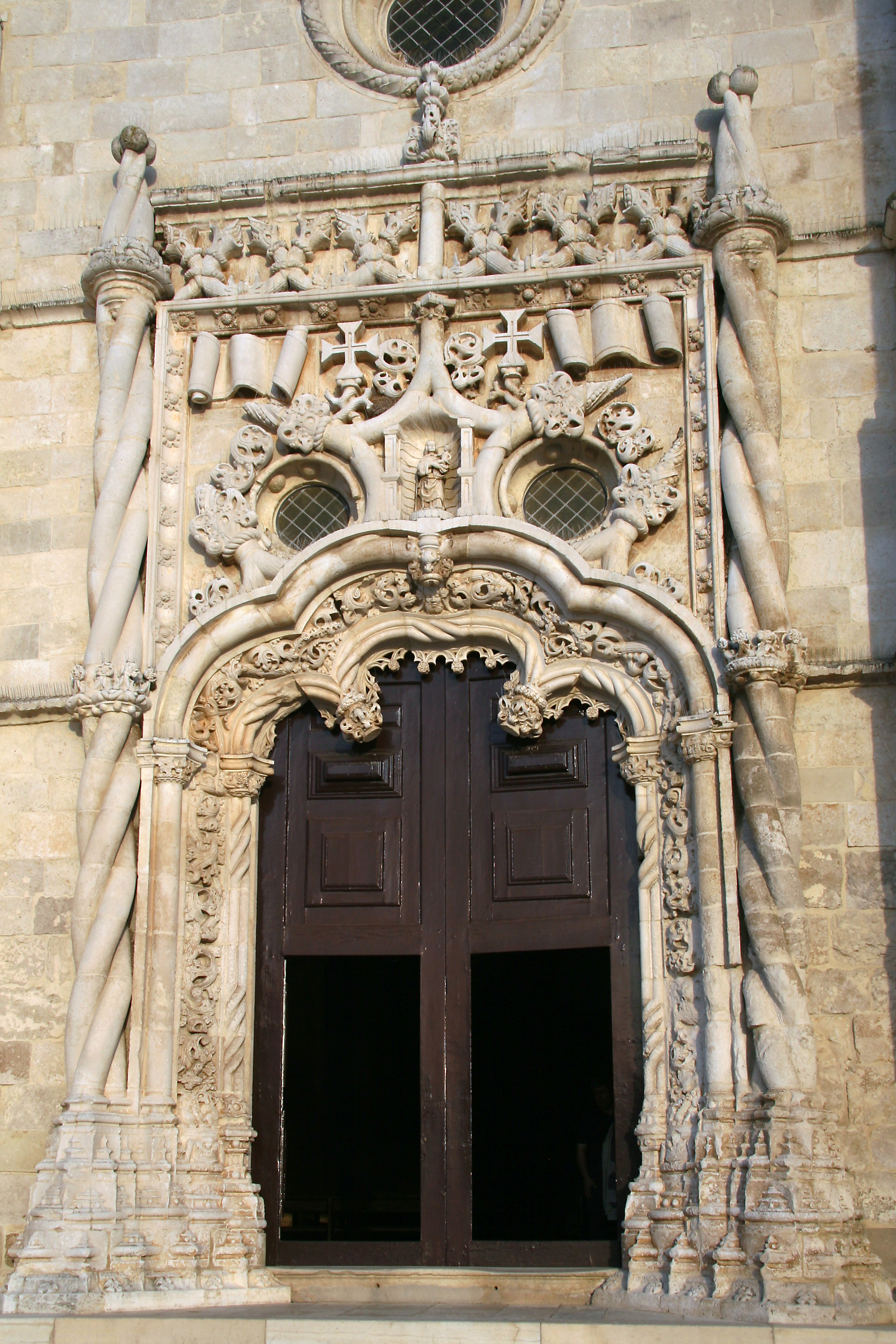
Doorframe of a church in Golegã

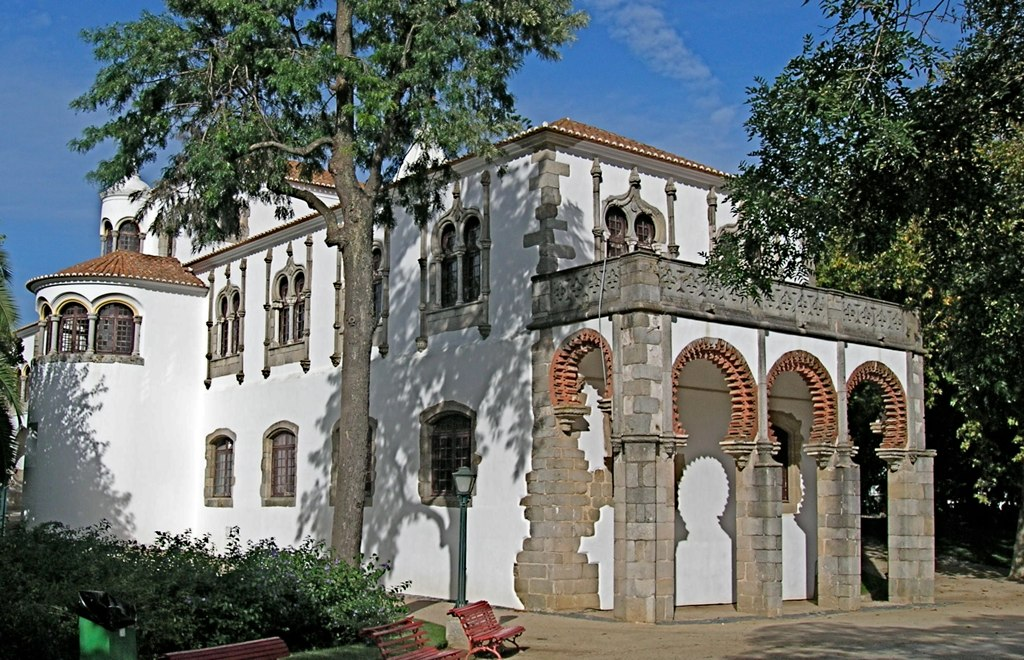
Royal palace at Évora

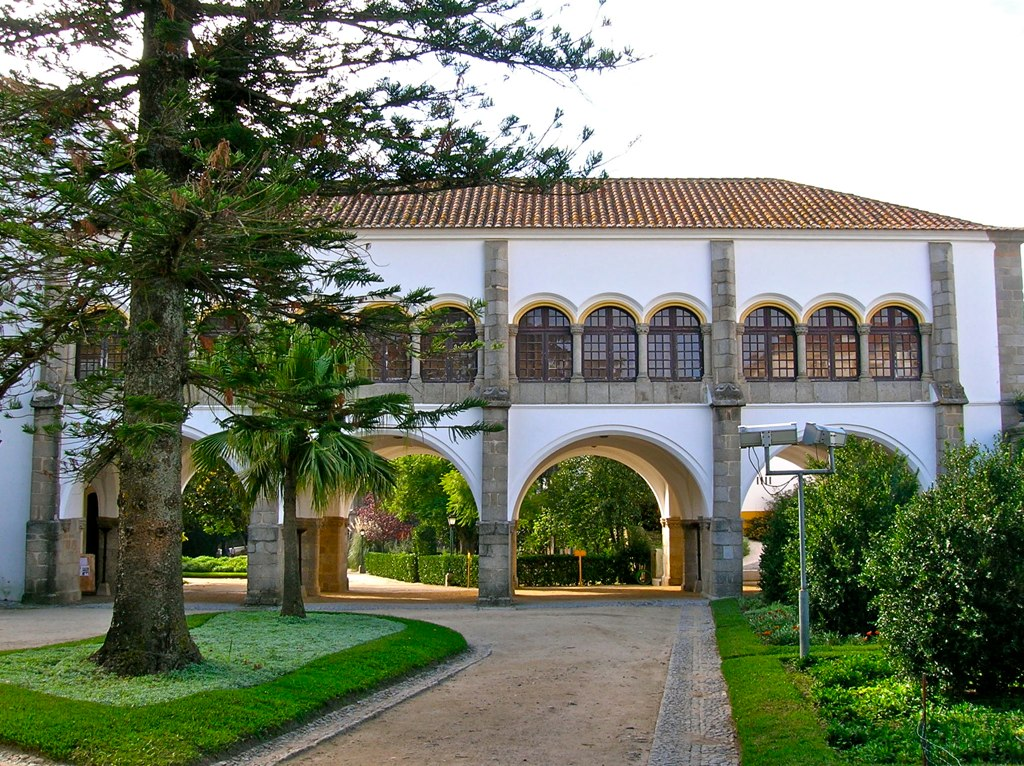
Royal palace at Évora, gallery

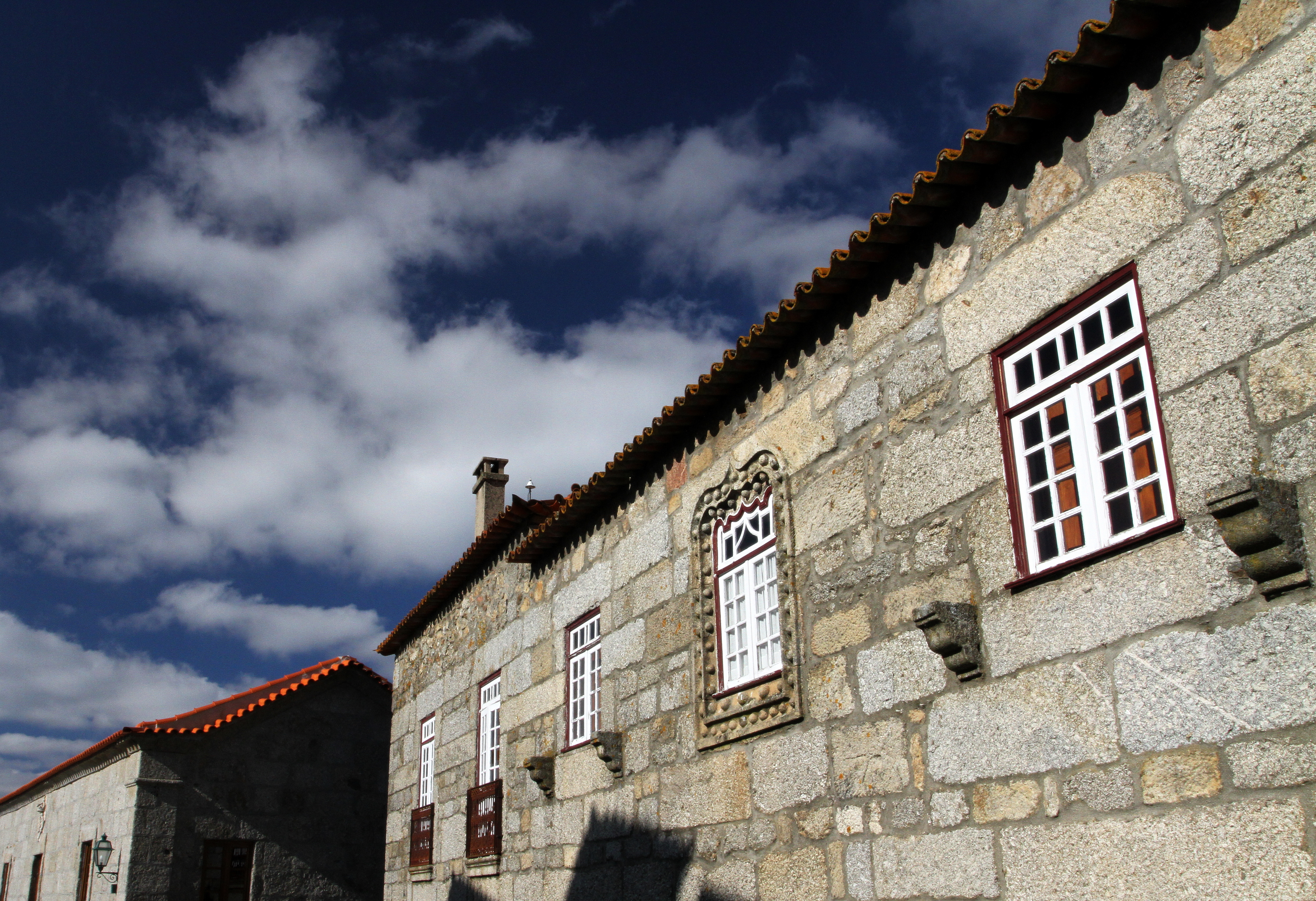
Manueline furnishings of a 16th century Portuguese countryside house

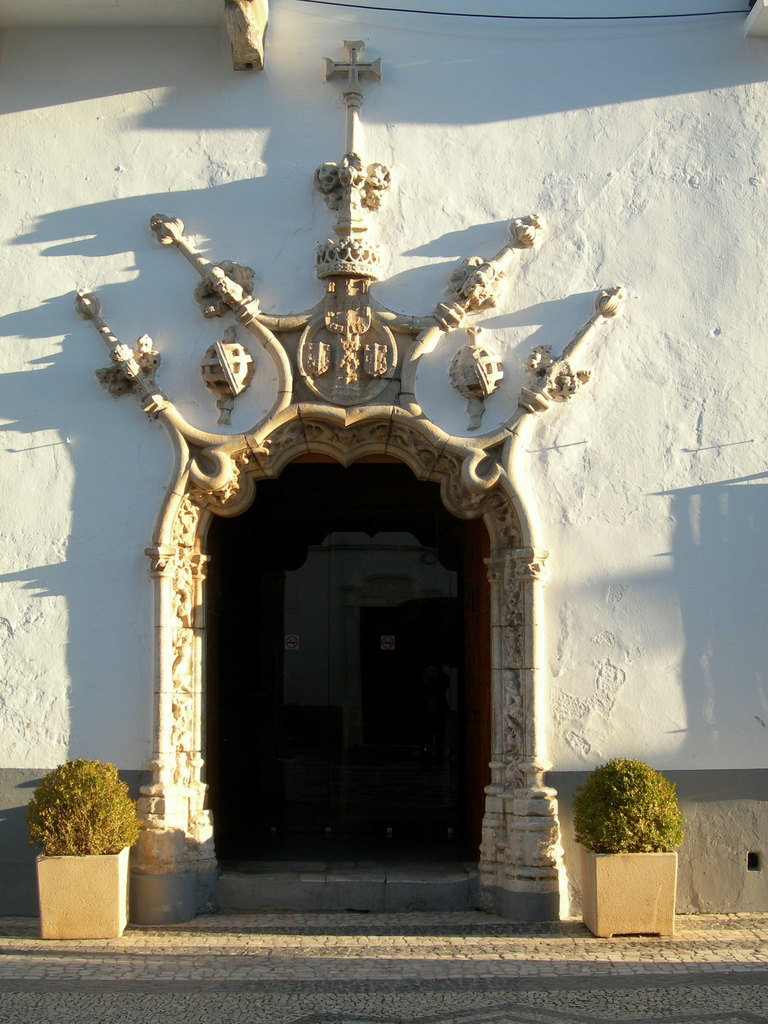
Manueline doorframe in Olivença, Spain

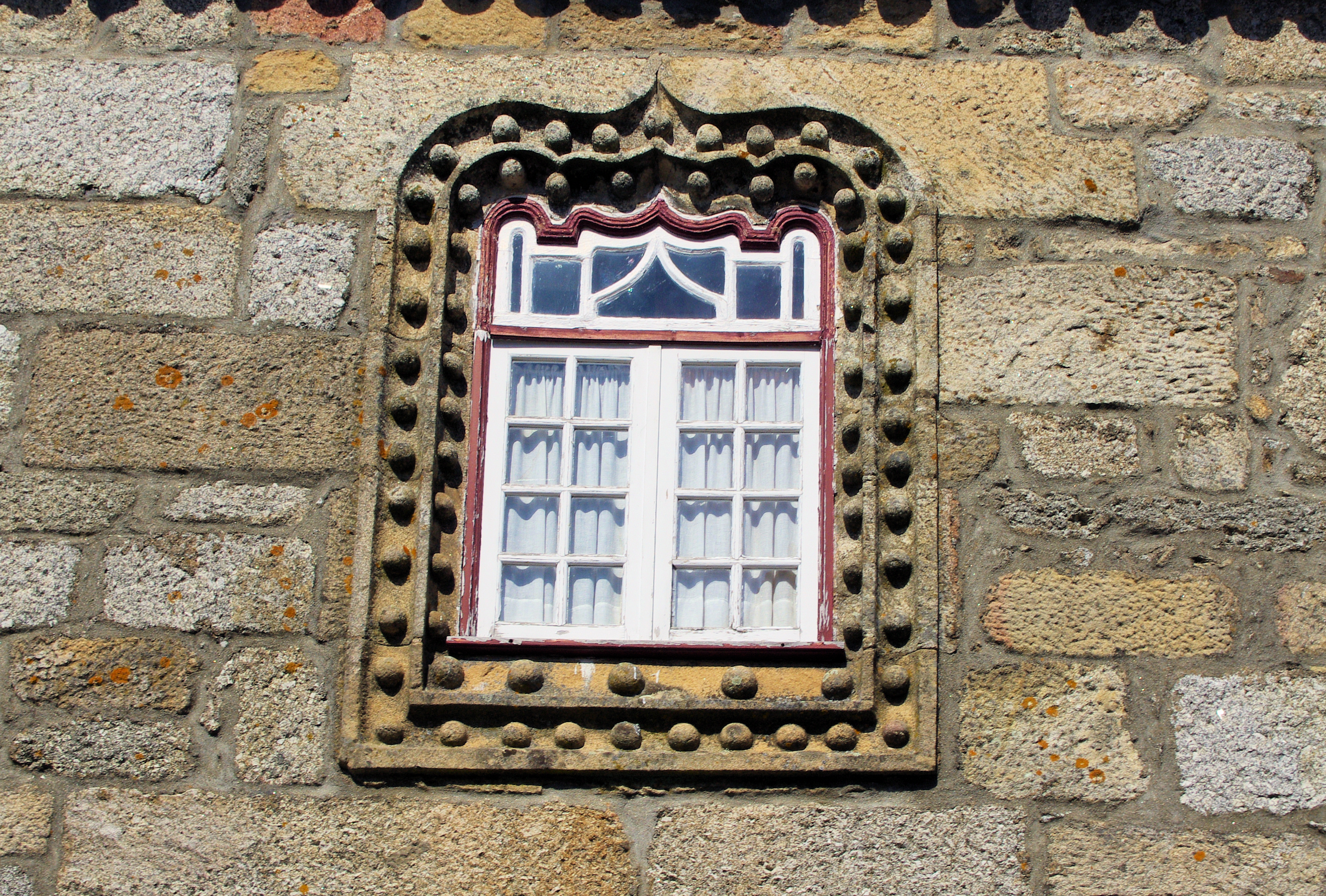
Manueline windowframe in Pinhel

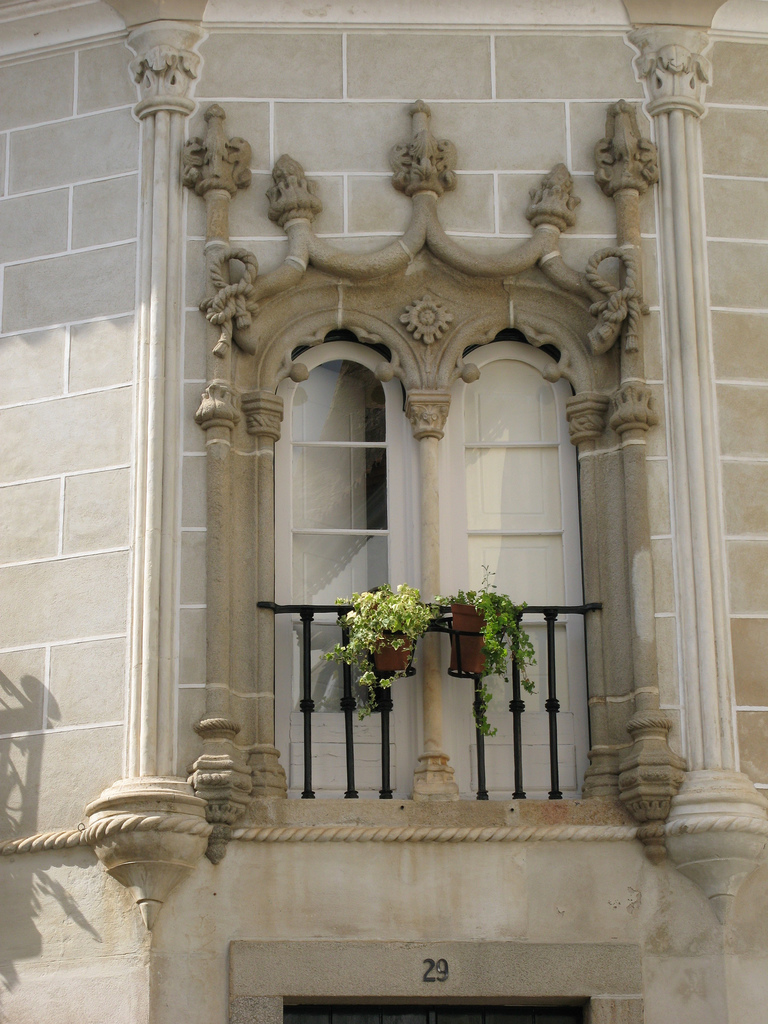
Windowframe in Évora

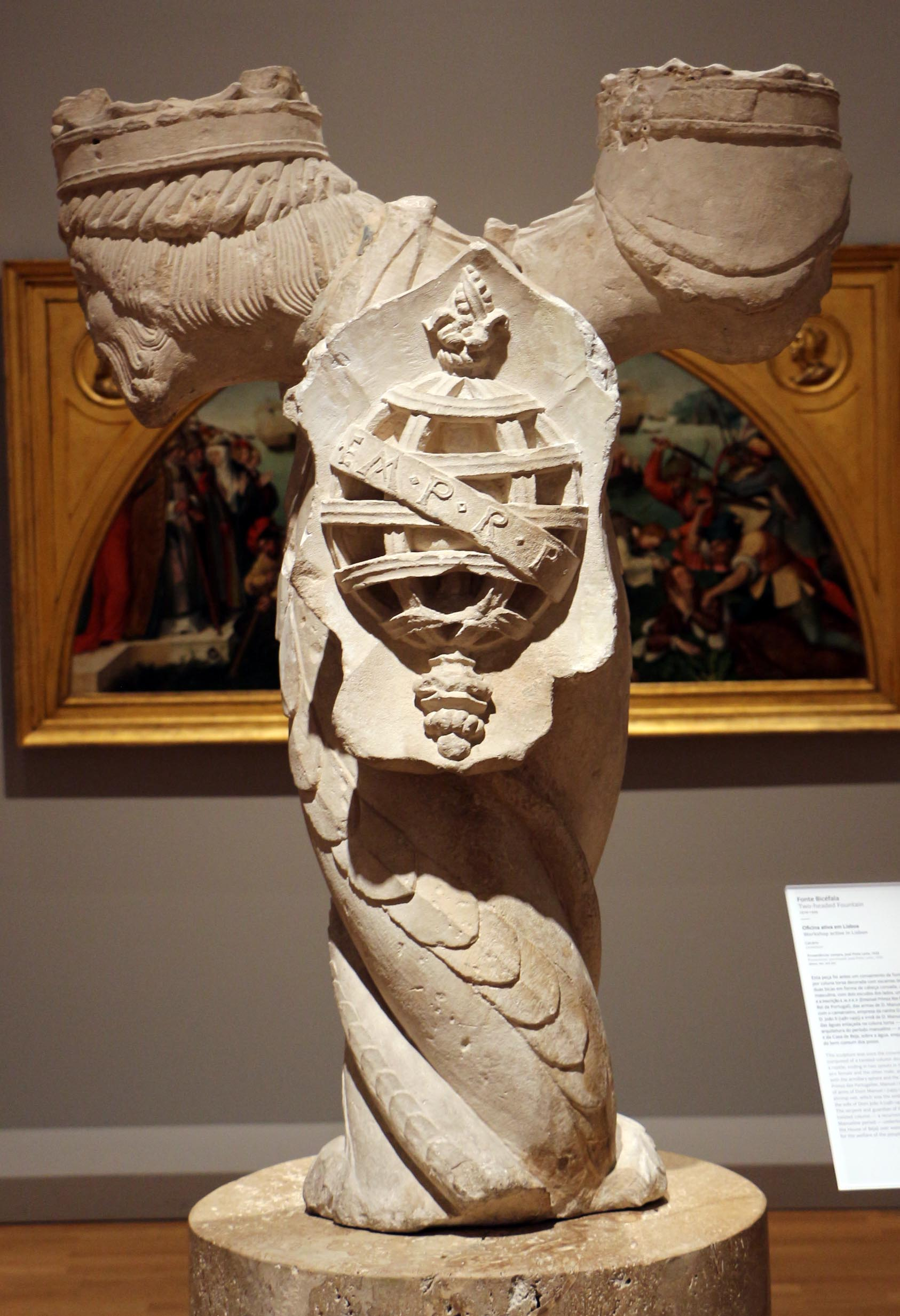
"Bicephalous Fountain", displaying both the heads of King Manuel and the Queen, and an armillary sphere, the royal emblem

Decorative motifs in the Monastery of Tomar

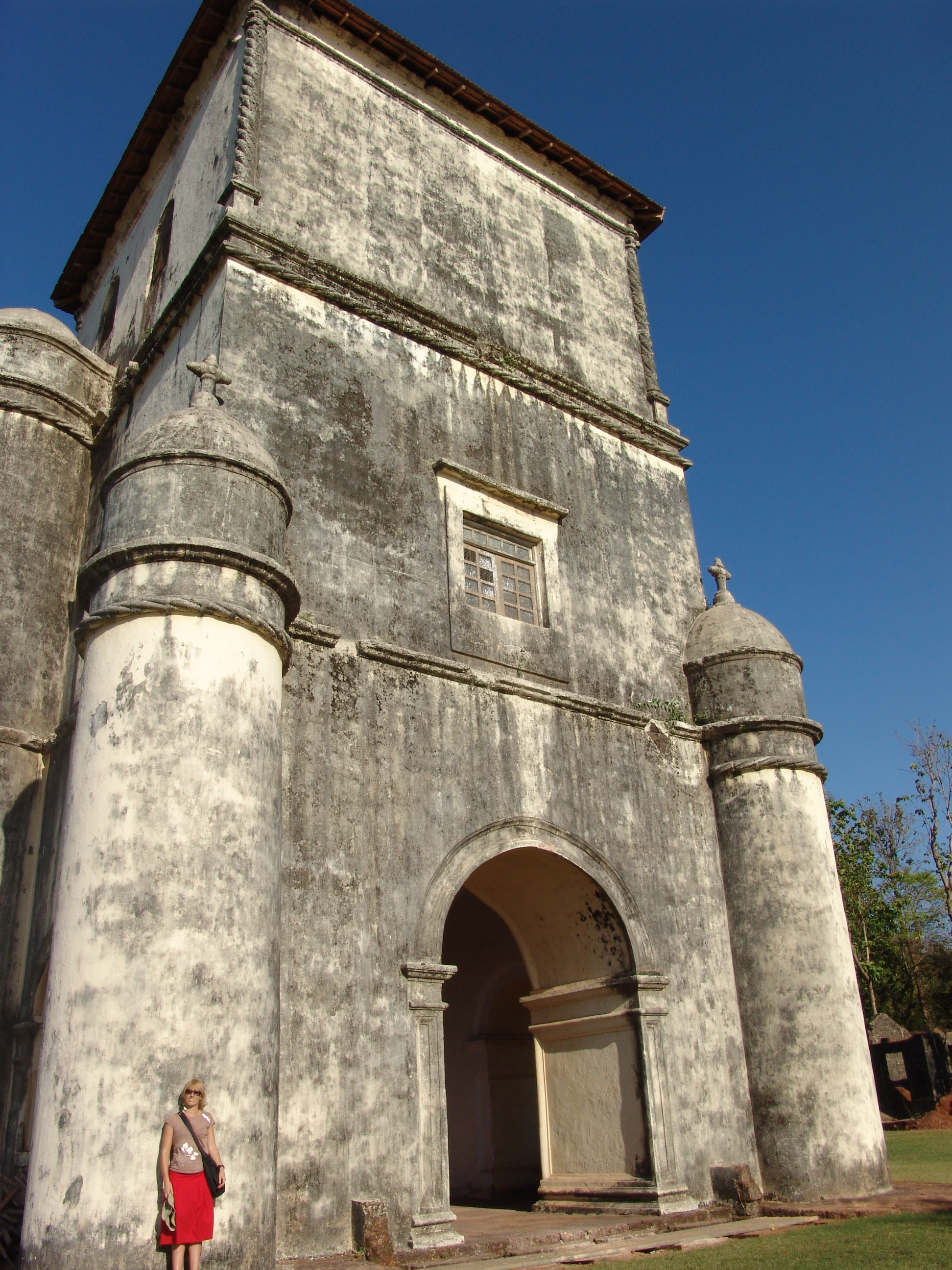
Manueline church in Goa, India

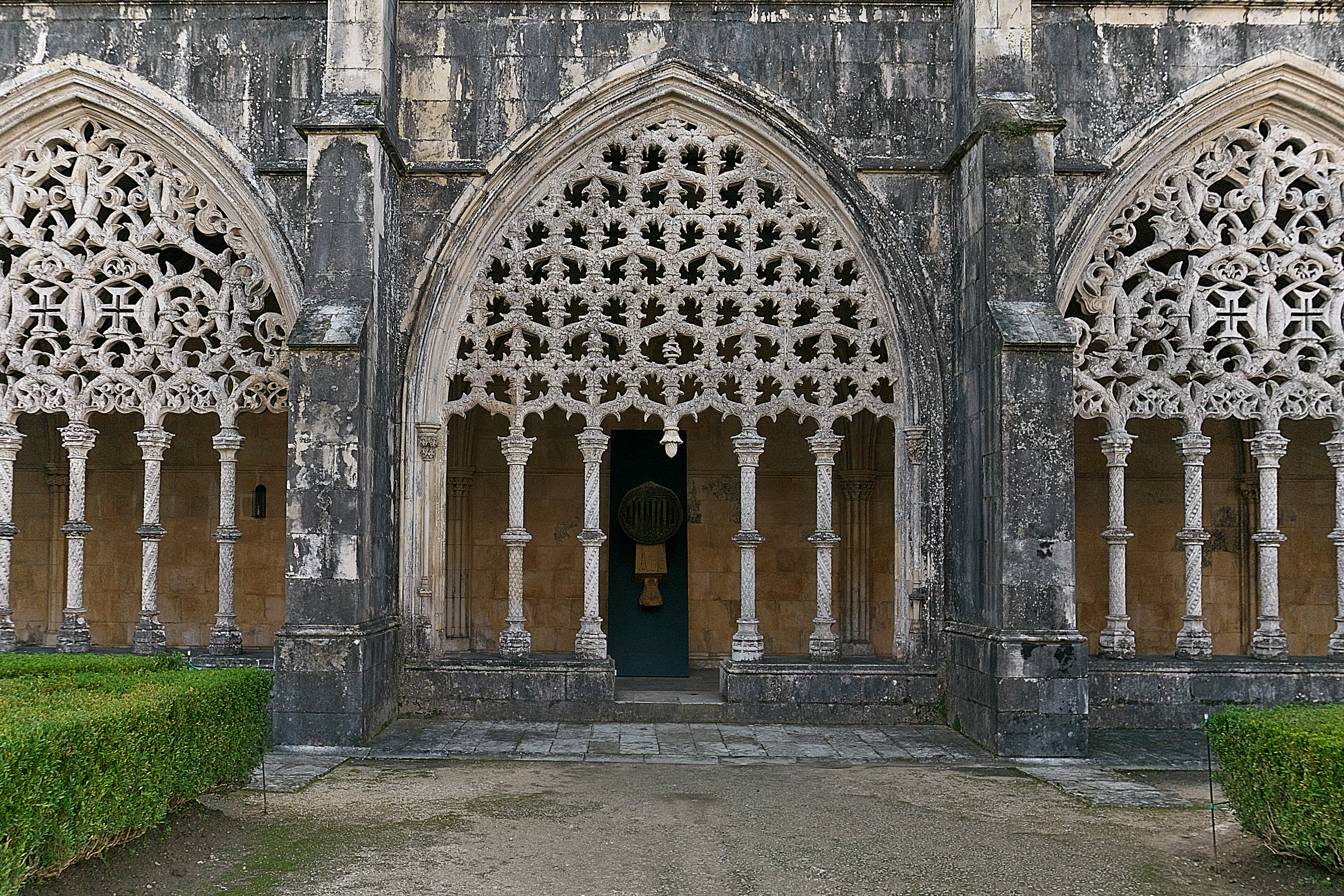
Cloyster at the Batalha monastery

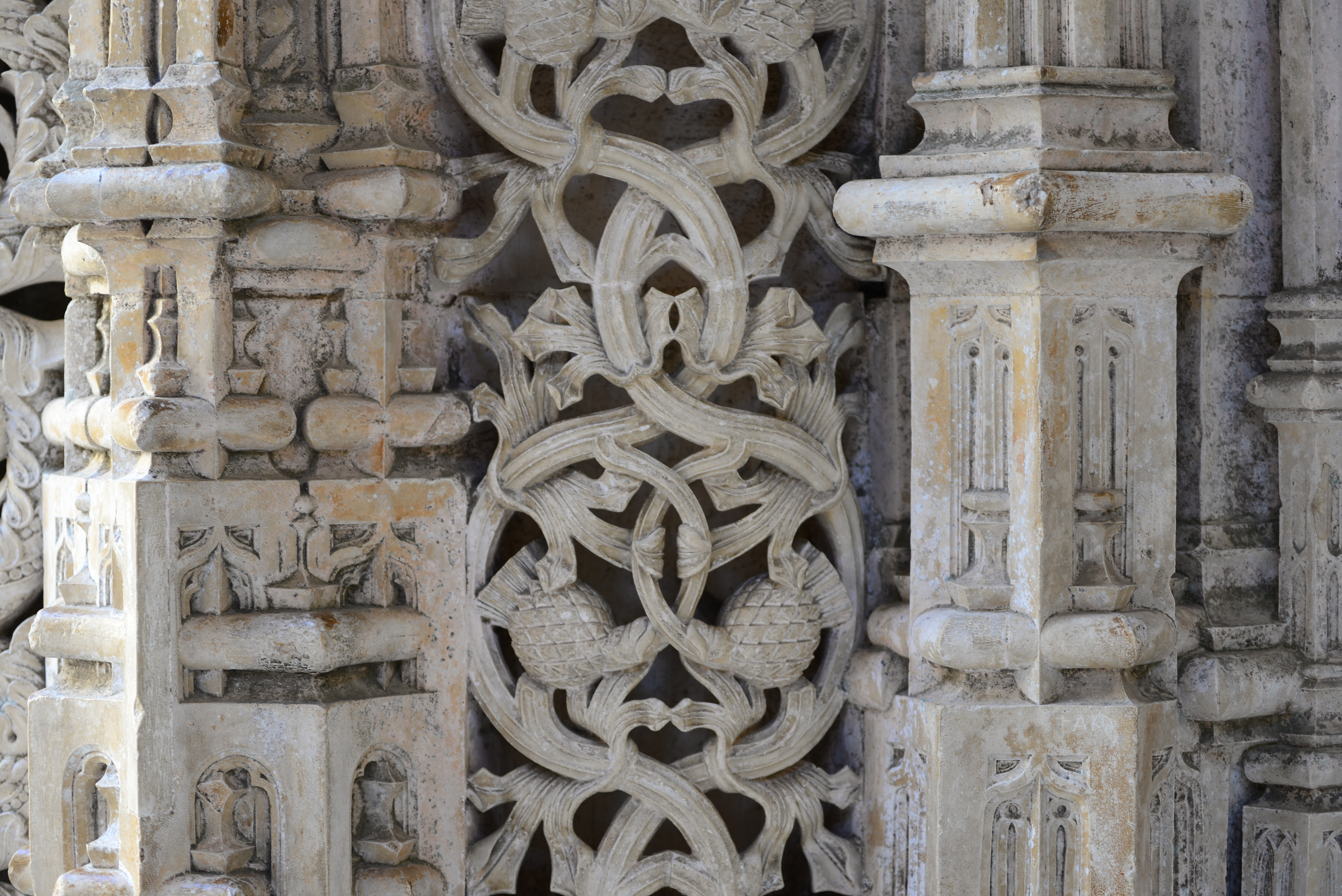
Detail of decorative motifs in the Batalha Monastery

Monastery of Batalha

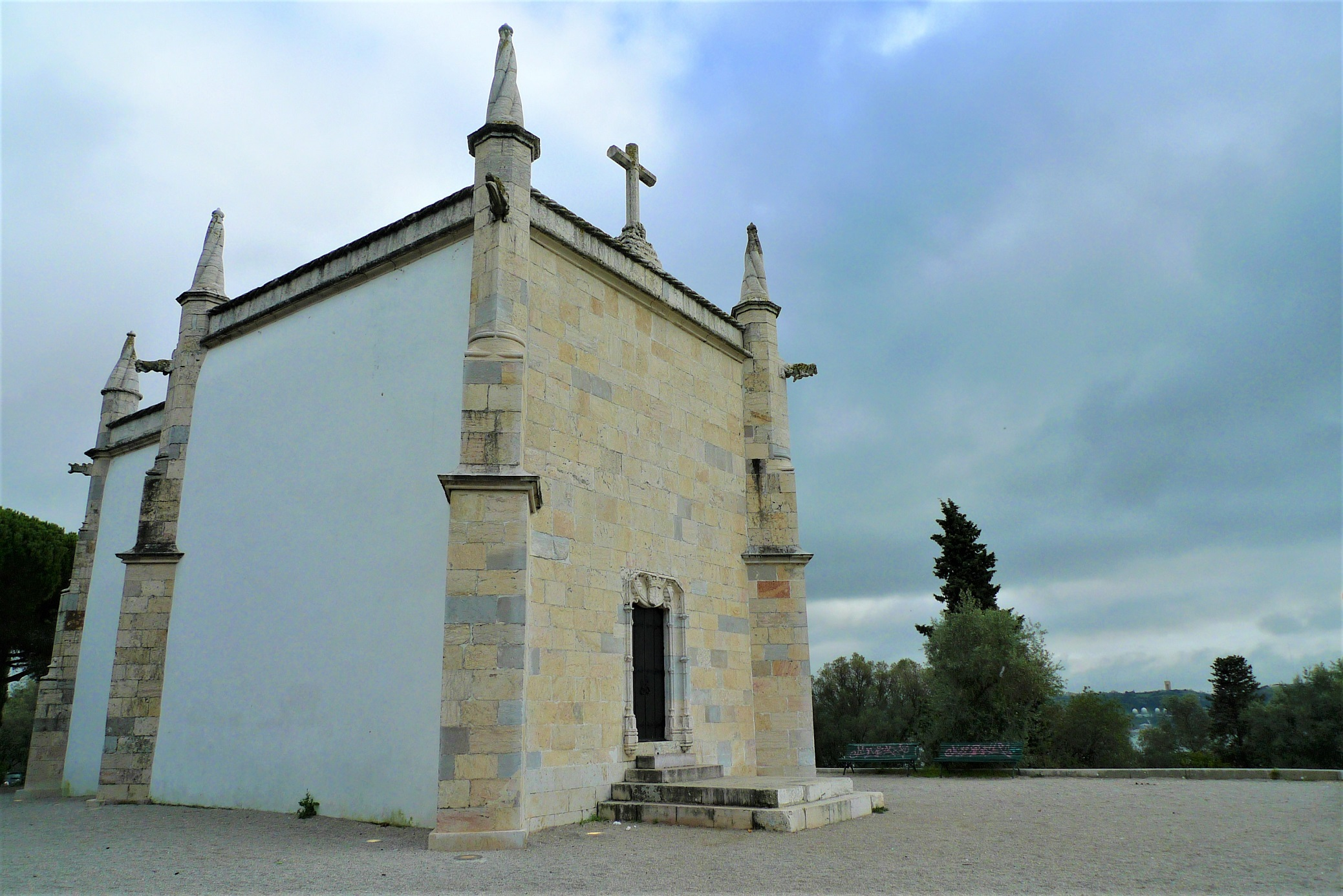
Chapel in Belém, Lisbon

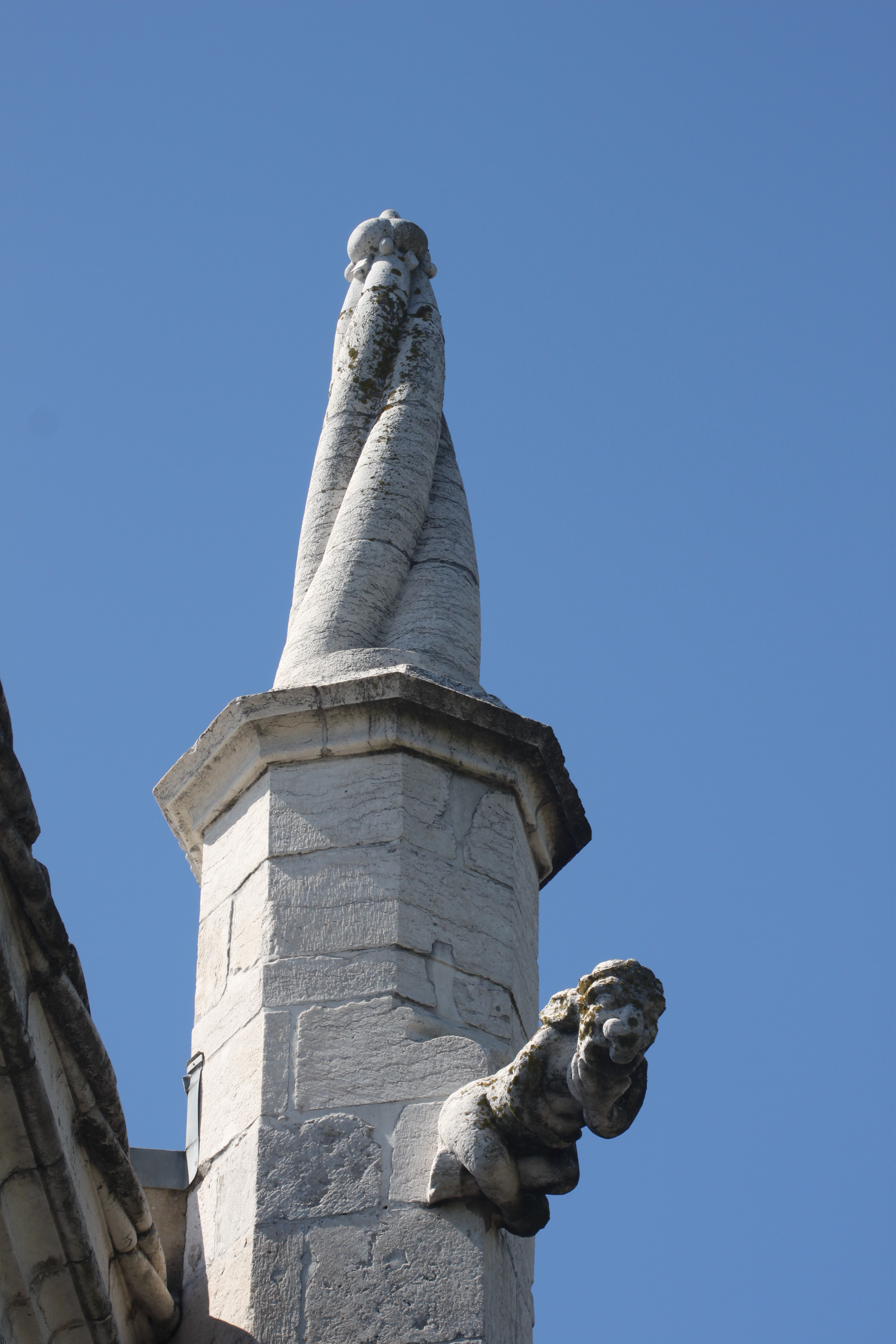
Detail of the chapel in Belém

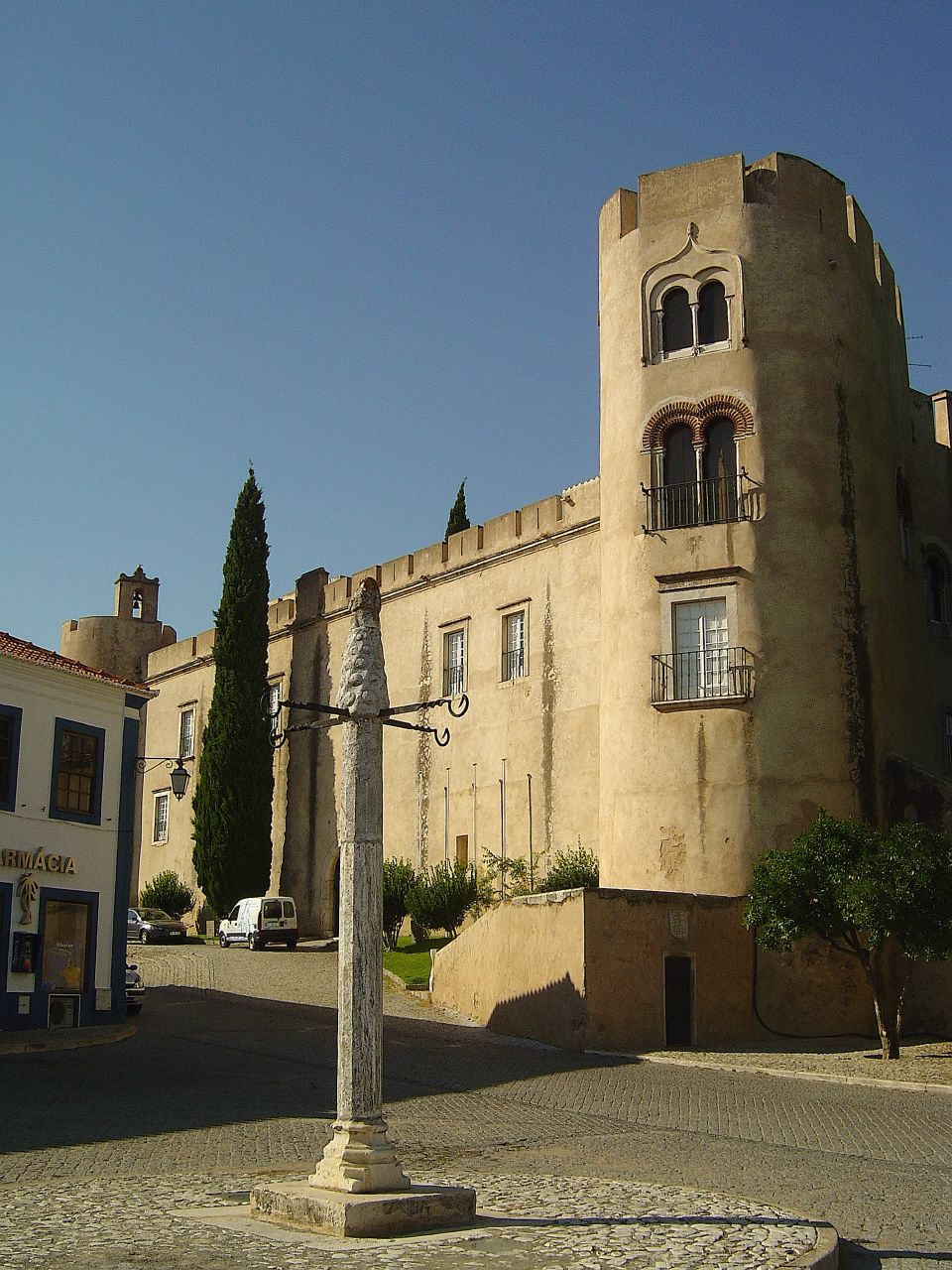
Castle of Alvito, with Manueline elements

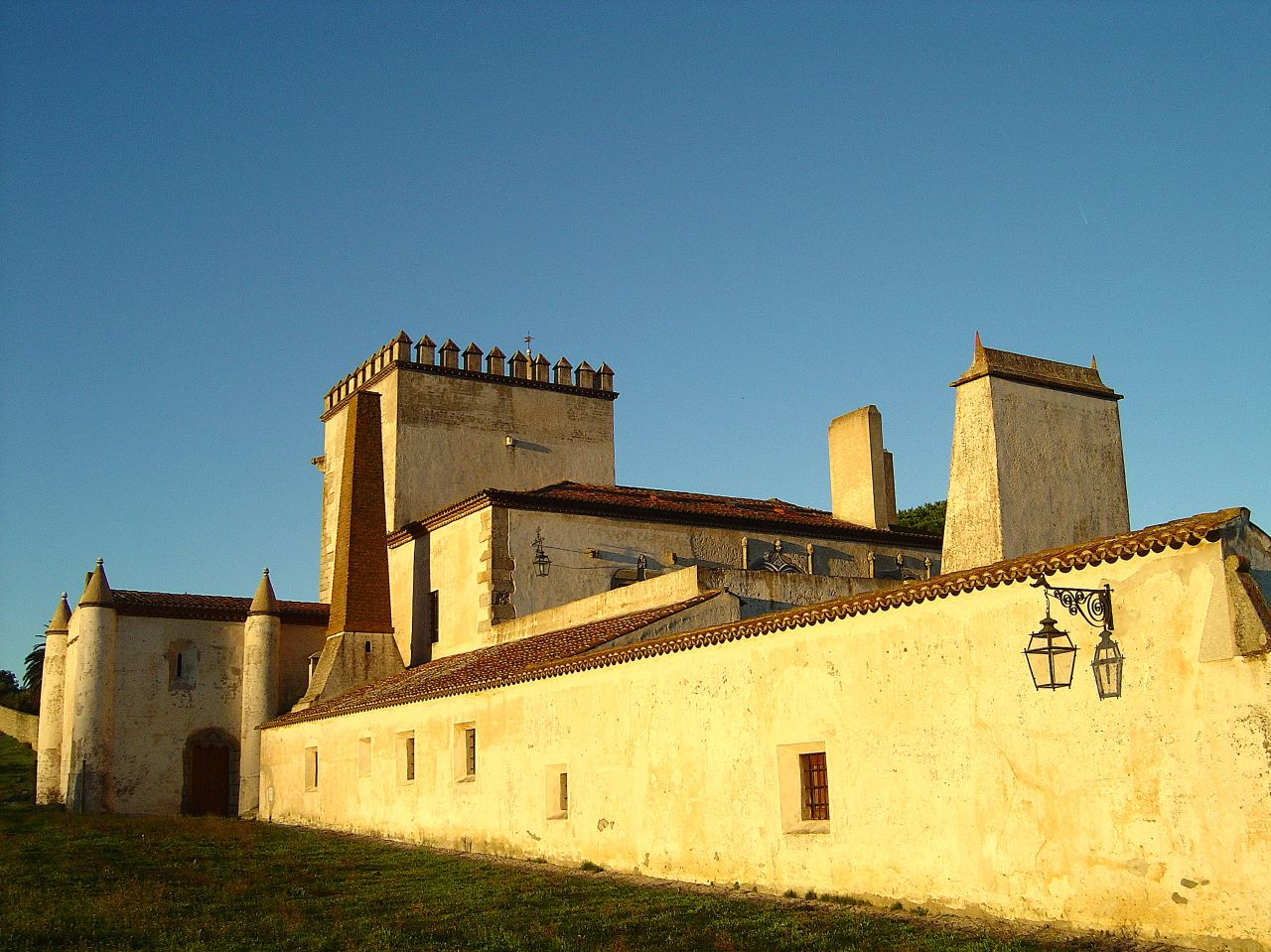
Sempre Noiva manor

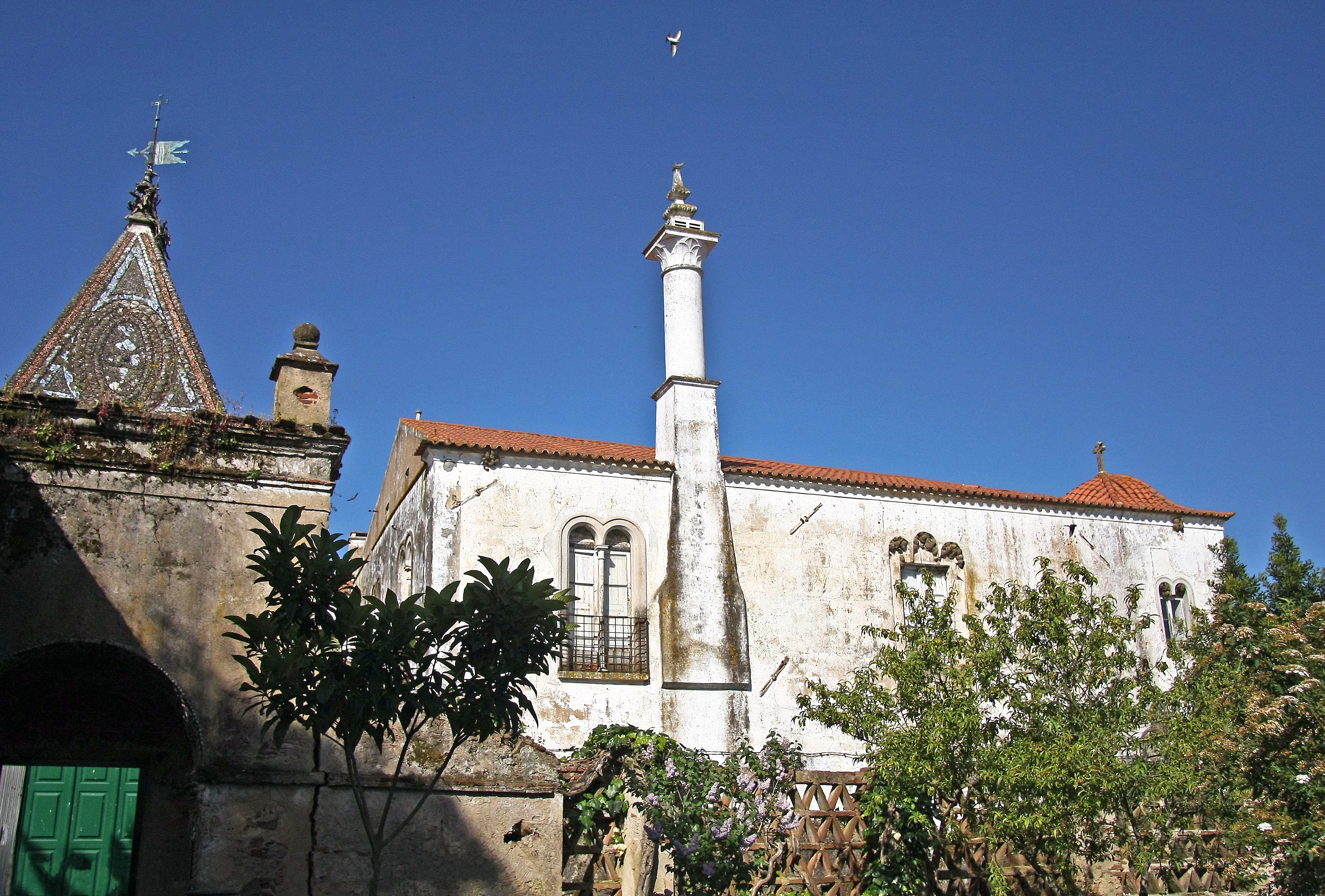
Manor of the Henriques de Trastámaras, in Alvor

== See also ==
- Neo-Manueline
- Portuguese Architecture
