= Diogo de Arruda =

Portuguese architect

The famous chapterhouse window, designed by Diogo de Arruda in 1510-1513

Diogo de Arruda (before 1490 – 1531) was a noted Portuguese architect that was active during the early years of the 16th century. He had some other important family members including his brother, Francisco de Arruda and his nephew, Miguel de Arruda.

Arruda designed the chapter house window at the Convent of Christ, in Tomar.

== Biography ==
Between 1508 and 1510, he was the architect of the Paço da Ribeira bastion erected by Manuel I of Portugal in Lisbon, in an area on the right bank of the Tagus River. This bastion was the finish of the royal palace and had a fortified tower decorated with the sovereign's arms, which would later be repeated in the Tower of Belém, erected between 1514 and 1519 by Francisco de Arruda.

Diogo de Arruda was one of the great names associated with the Manueline remodelling of the Convent of Christ, serving as a master there from 1510 to 1513. During this period, he built a choir on the west side of the old Templar charcoal, with two levels: the upper one occupied by the monks' high choir, and the lower one by the sacristy, also referred to as the "chapter room". The entire west facade of the choir, flanked by two large buttresses, is abundantly decorated with heraldic and naturalistic motifs. In it is the famous window of the sacristy of the church, one of the most famous works of Manueline. The work on the choir of the Convent of Christ was continued from 1515 by João de Castilho.

In 1513 Diogo de Arruda went to the fortress of Azamor in Maghreb, where he worked as a military engineer with his brother Francisco. They erected the alcácer (castle), bastions, reinforced walls and even built dwelling houses there. Diogo and Francisco also worked on the fortification of Safim and Mazagão in North Africa.

Back in Portugal, he was appointed by the sovereign as "Master of Works of the Comarca of Entre Tejo and Odiana" (1521). This position can be explained by the relative weakness of the Portuguese defences in the Alentejo compared to other regions at the time. At that time, he was already directing the works of the New Castle of Évora, built between 1518 and 1524. The design of this castle, with a square plan with turrets at the vertices, follows Renaissance models of military architecture and represents an innovation in the country. Although much altered, in our days, it retains the original plan and the bases of the turrets, with the typical Manueline string motif. He is also believed to have carried out church projects, such as the Matrix of Viana does Alentejo, one of the best examples of religious Manueline architecture.

In 1525, already under the reign of João III of Portugal, he was appointed architect of the royal palaces. At that time, he likely participated in the works of the Paços Reais de Évora, a large palace complex that had been under construction since the 15th century.

== Bibliography ==
- Disney, A. R. (2009). A History of Portugal and the Portuguese Empire, vol. 1: Portugal. Cambridge University Press. ISBN 978-0-521-60397-3.
- Pereira, Paulo, 2004: The work of brothers Diogo and Francisco de Arruda in Torre de Belém. Scala Publishers
