= Francisco de Arruda =

Portuguese architect (died 1547)

Francisco de Arruda, (d. November 30, 1547), was a Portuguese architect and sculptor, most notable for his design of the Belém Tower in Lisbon, Portugal.

He was the younger brother of Diogo de Arruda and father of Miguel de Arruda. Francisco and Diogo de Arruda assimilated the flamboyant Gothic style and developed the Manueline style in their buildings.

== Biography ==
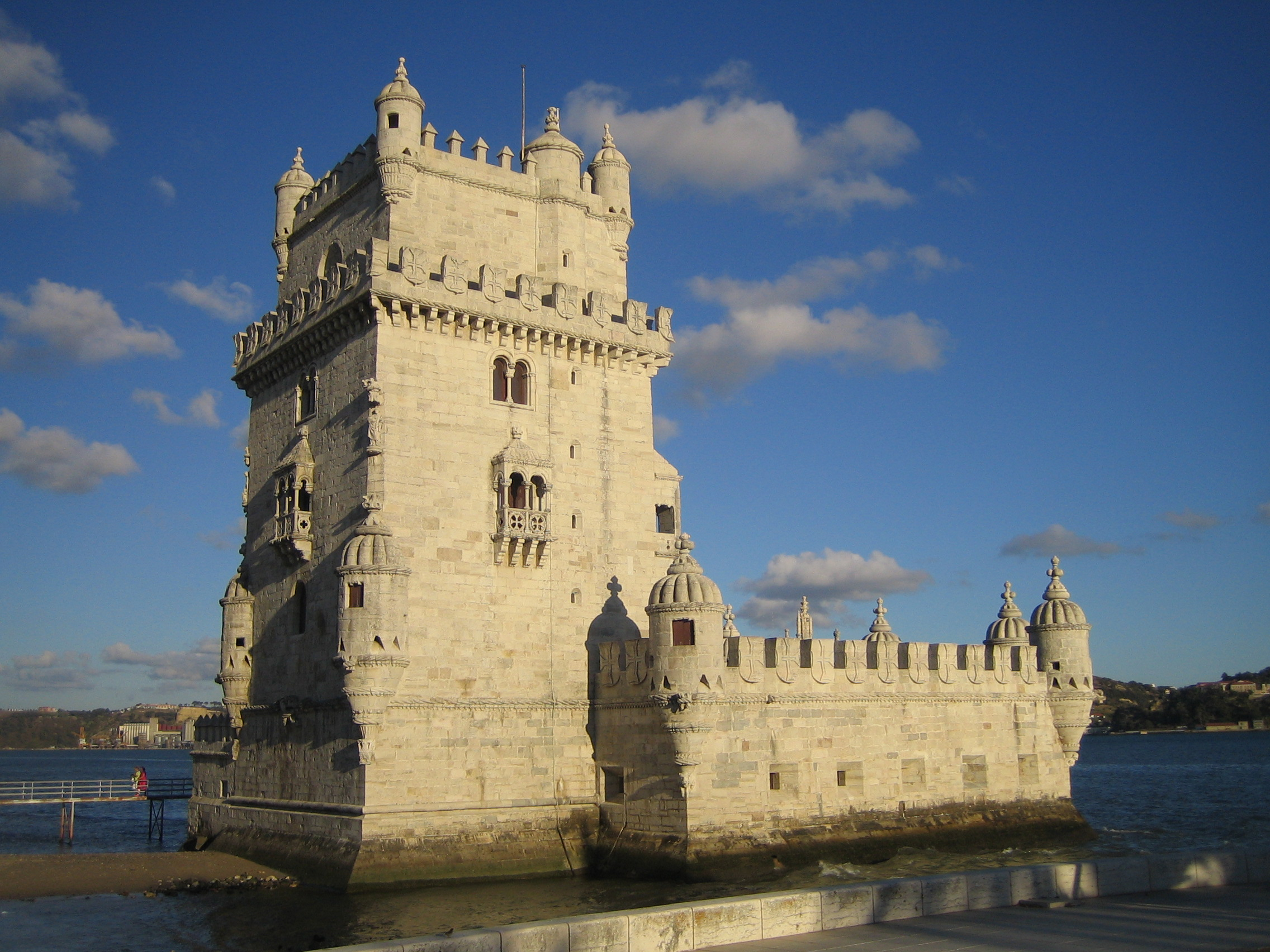
The Belém Tower

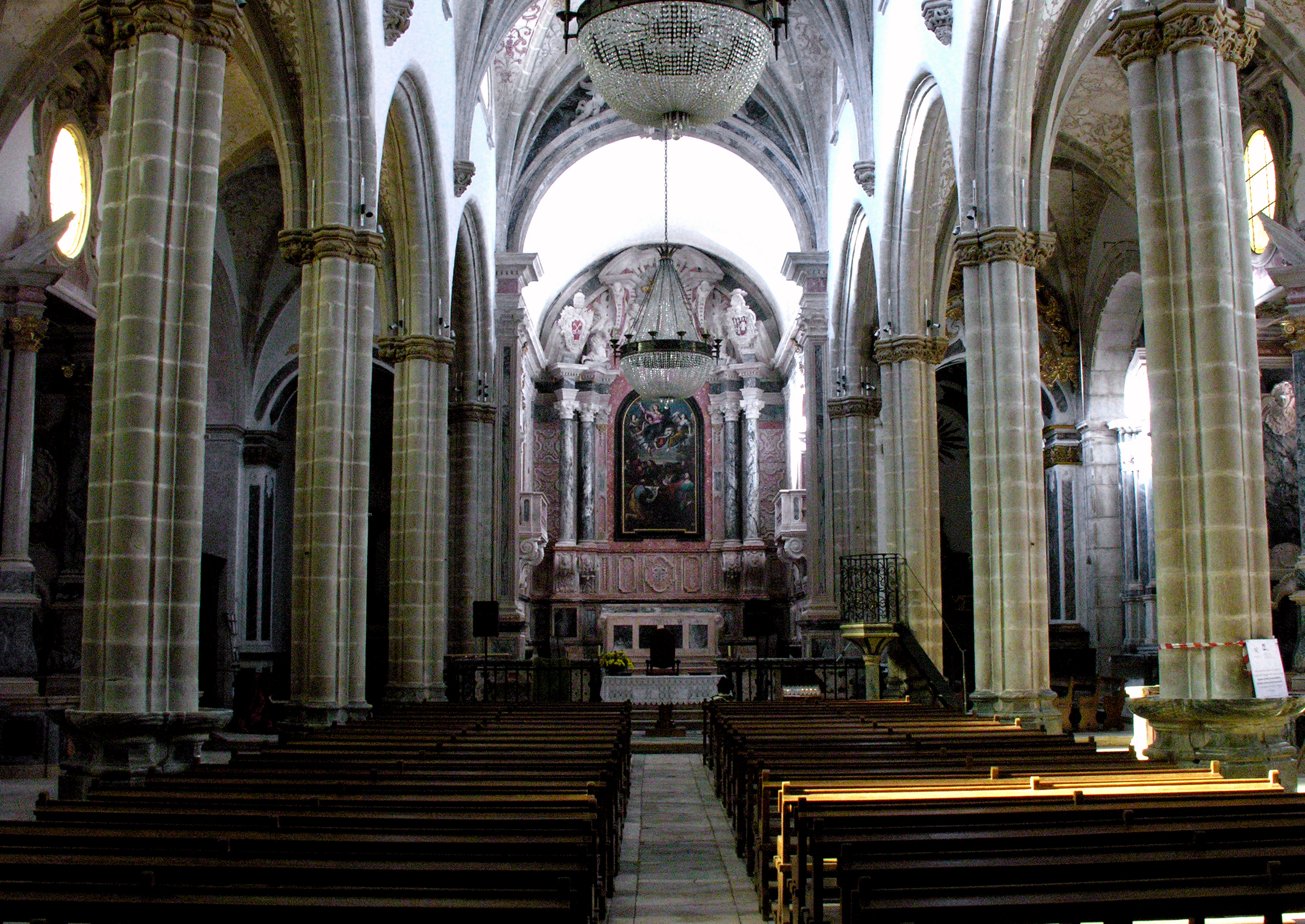
Interior of Our Lady of the Assumption

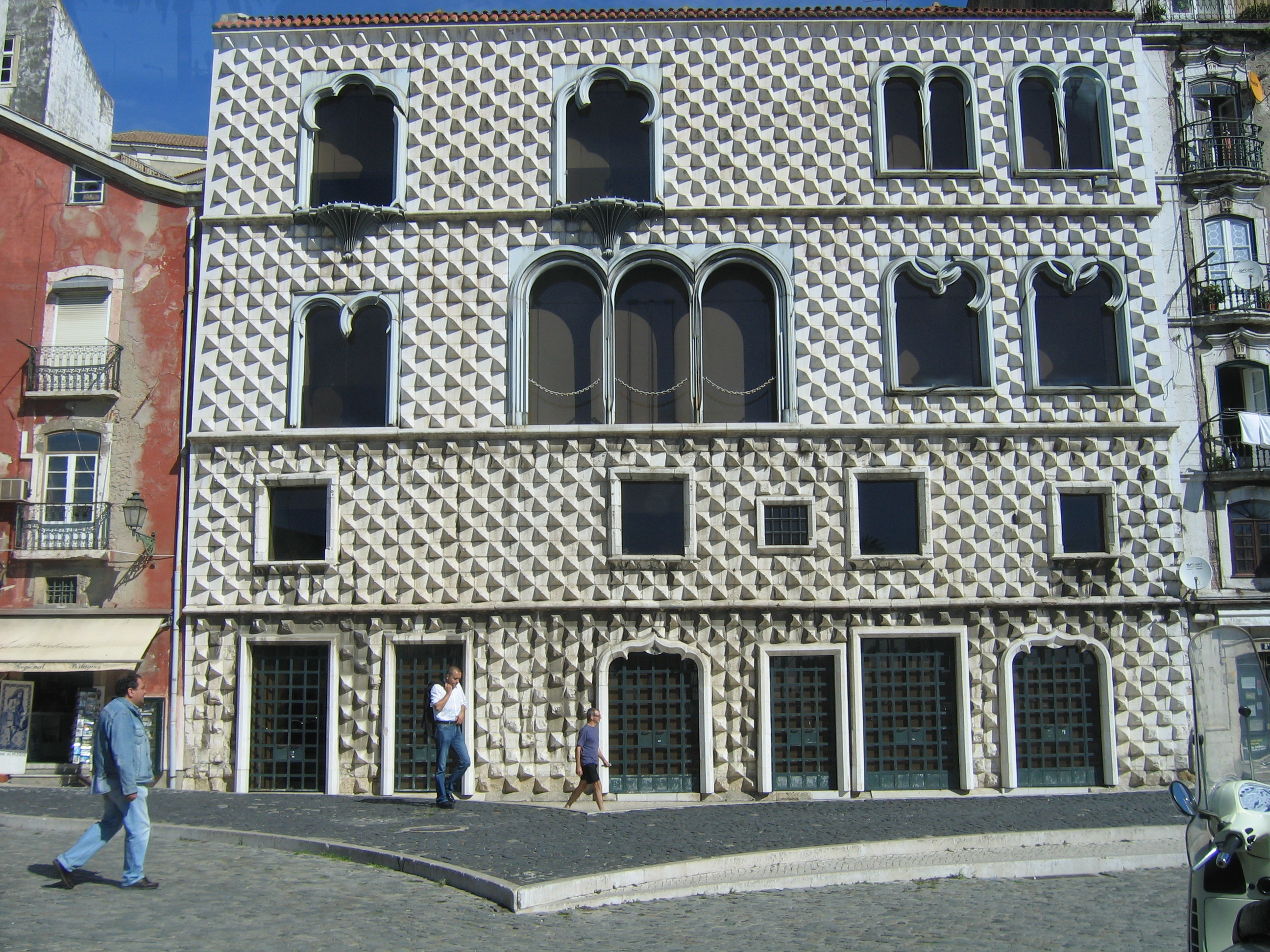
Casa dos Bicos

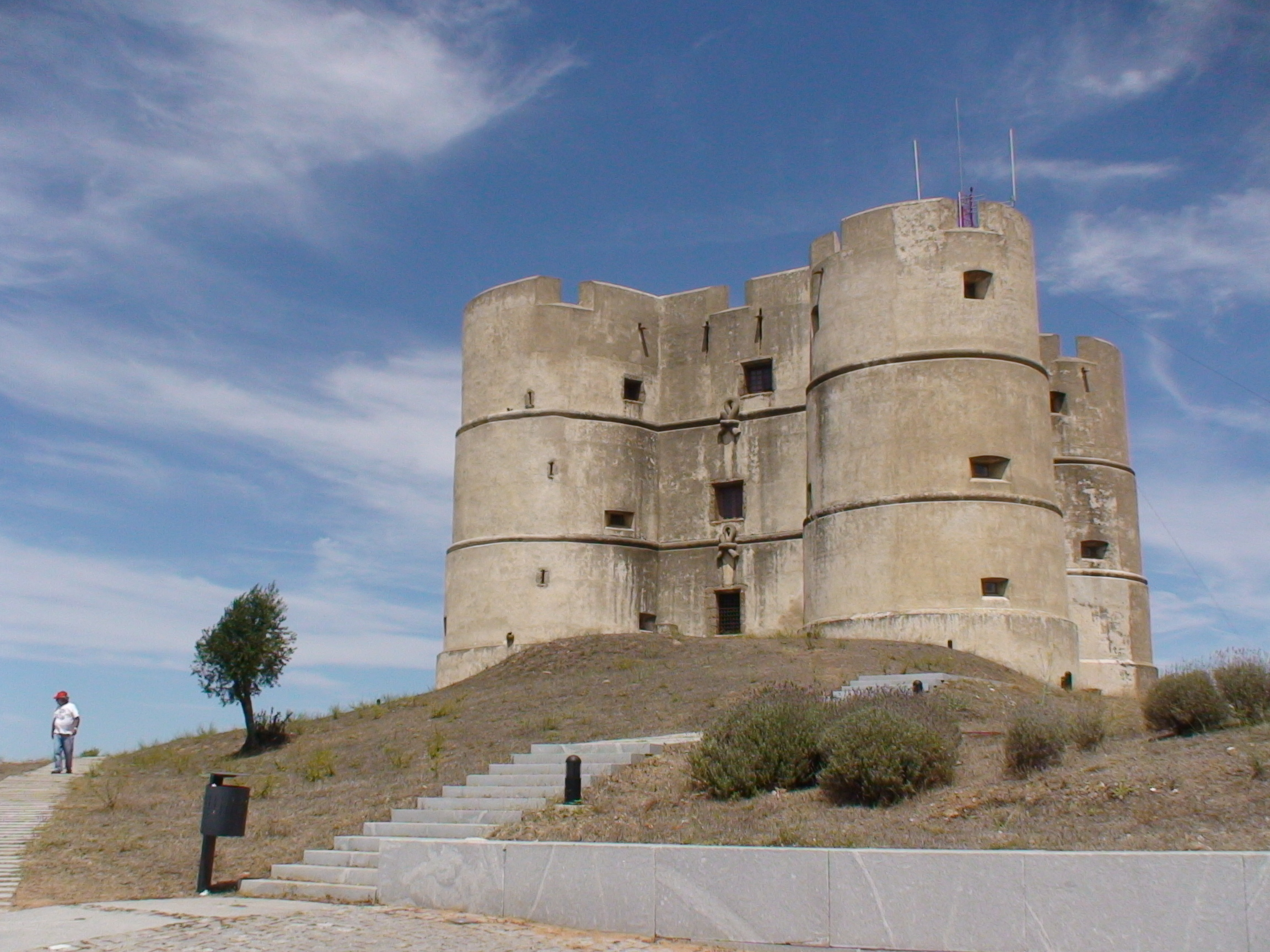
Castle of Évora Monte

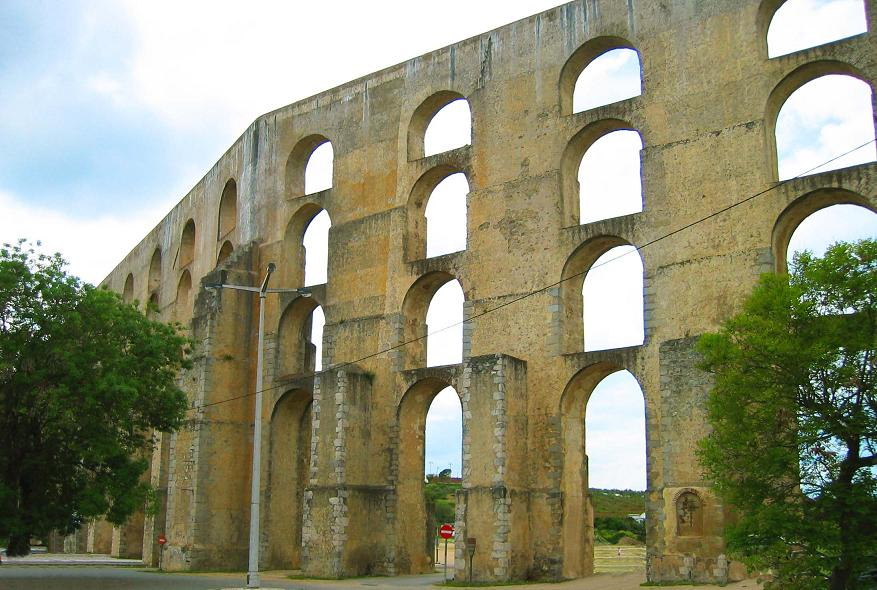
Amoreira aqueduct

He was in charge of repairing the fortifications of Moura, Mourão and Portel. There, in addition to repairing the walls, he introduced semicircular towers that would better resist artillery than walls adapted for ballistas. Built for Don Jaime, Duke of Bragança, the castle of Portel and the Capela de S. João Baptista have fallen into ruin.

Francisco accompanied his brother Diogo to North Africa, to Safi, Morocco and Mazagão, in order to work in the stronghold of Azemmour.

In 1520 the Arrudas worked in Évora and the Monastery of S. Francisco. In this period, de Arruda designed the layout of the Our Lady of the Assumption Cathedral, Elvas, sharing characteristics with the Igreja Matriz de Olivença, with its large central tower.

After the death of Diogo in 1531, Francisco followed a different design philosophy, gradually converting to the a more humanist culture. Francisco's later works show signs of Renaissance thought. de Arruda may have worked at the Palácio da Bacalhoa, in its initial phase, around 1530.

== Architectural characteristics ==
Diogo and Francisco de Arruda translated the Mediterranean and Nordic influences of late-Gothic to Portugal. Characteristics include the use of cylindrical volumes; military references, and extensive decoration drawing from natural elements.

== Bibliography ==
- Bernard Oudin, Dictionnaire des architectes, p. 33, Seghers, Paris, 1994 ISBN 2-232-10398-6 ; p. 664

=== External links ===
- Structurae : Francesco de Arruda
