= Royal Walls of Ceuta =

Set of fortifications in the Spanish city of Ceuta

- Murallas Reales de Ceuta
- Ceuta, Spain
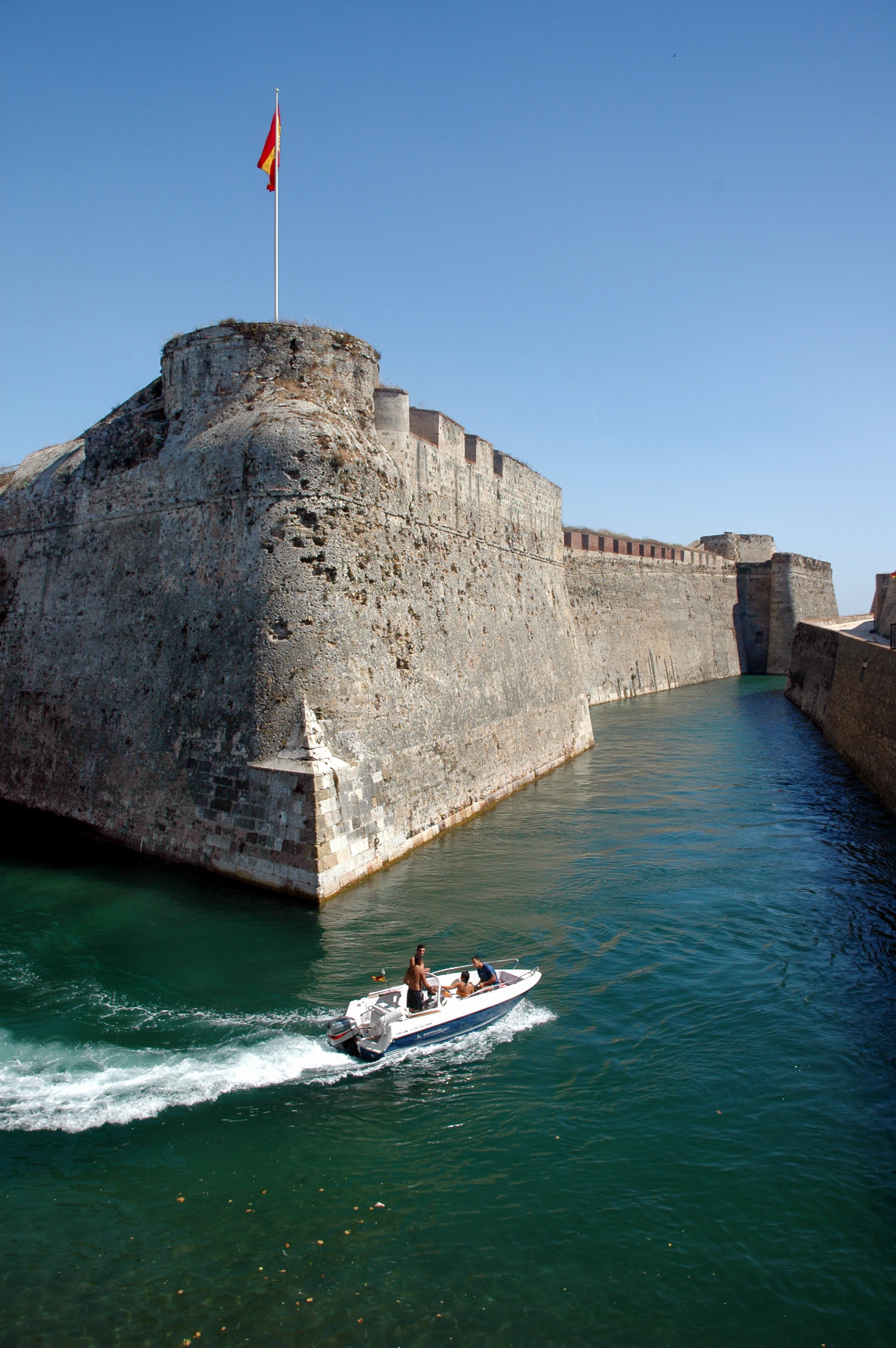
- The Royal Walls and their sea-filled ditch

Site information
- Type: Line of fortifications
- Open to the public: Yes
- Condition: Main walls intact Outworks partially intact

Location
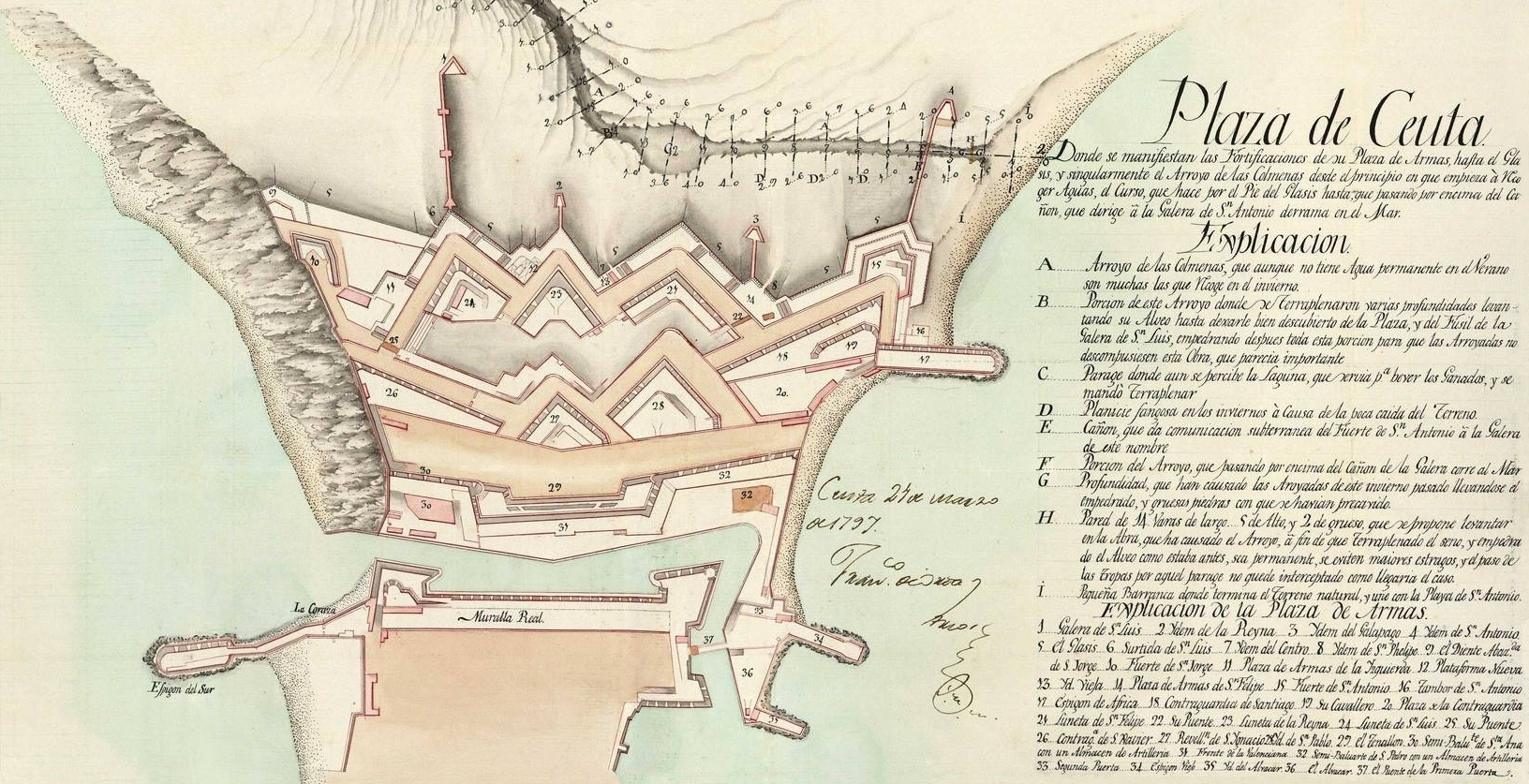
- Map of the Royal Walls of Ceuta in 1797
- Coordinates: 35°53′19″N 5°19′8″W

Site history
- Built: 962–18th century
- Built by: Kingdom of Portugal; Kingdom of Spain
- In use: 10th–19th century
- Battles/wars: Sieges of Ceuta

Spanish Cultural Heritage
- Official name: Conjunto Histórico Artístico Murallas Reales y foso de San Felipe
- Type: Non-movable
- Criteria: Monument
- Designated: 3 July 1985
- Reference no.: RI - 53 - 0000305

The Royal Walls of Ceuta (Spanish: Murallas Reales de Ceuta) are a line of fortification in Ceuta, an autonomous Spanish city in north Africa. The walls date to 962 in its oldest part and the most modern parts to the 18th century. They remain largely intact, with the exception of some outworks, and are listed as a Spanish Property of Cultural Interest.

== History ==
Ceuta had been a naval base since Carthaginian and Roman times, and had some form of fortification since at least the 5th century. The city was captured by the Portuguese during the Conquest of Ceuta in 1415, who began to strengthen the defences in the 1540s by building the Royal Walls including bastions, a navigable moat and a drawbridge. Some of these bastions are still standing, like the bastions of Coraza Alta, Bandera and Mallorquines.

In 1669, Ceuta became part of the Kingdom of Spain following the dissolution of the Iberian Union. The walls at the southern end of the city were severely damaged in a storm in 1674, but were quickly repaired. Some outworks were subsequently added to reinforce the Royal Walls.

The Royal Walls played a significant role in the Sieges of Ceuta, which began in 1694. Whenever there was an interval in the fighting, the Spanish added more outworks. The siege was broken in 1720 after the arrival of a relief force, and the outworks were completely rebuilt at this stage. Ceuta was besieged again in 1721, but by now the fortifications were much stronger and the last Moorish attempt to take the city ended in 1734.

Further modifications to the fortifications were made in the 1730s. Another Moorish siege occurred between 1790 and 1791, but the attack was repelled. During the Napoleonic Wars, the city was garrisoned by British troops allied with Spain. The walls were eventually decommissioned when they became obsolete in the 19th century.

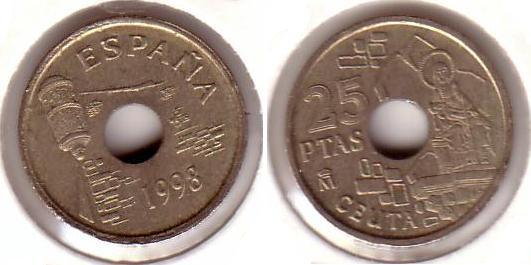
1998 25-peseta coin featuring the Royal Walls

Parts of the walls, especially the outworks, were demolished to make way for urban development. However, the Royal Walls, their ditch, and the first line of outworks remain intact, and have been restored in recent years. On 3 July 1985 they were declared a Spanish heritage site. The walls were one of 100 candidates for the 12 Treasures of Spain in 2007 and the only one of those in Ceuta. Parts of the walls are open to the public.

== Layout ==
The Royal Walls are a land front running across the isthmus separating Ceuta from the rest of North Africa. The walls consist of two large bastions at each end of the wall, which are called Baluarte de la Coraza and Baluarte de la Bandera, and a smaller bastion at the north flank. They are protected by a ditch filled with seawater. Batteries were also built on breakwaters at either side of the walls.

The walls were surrounded by a number of outworks, consisting of hornworks, ravelins and counterguards. Today, the first line of outworks remains intact, but other parts were demolished over the years.

The east end of Ceuta was also fortified with two small bastions.

== Gallery ==
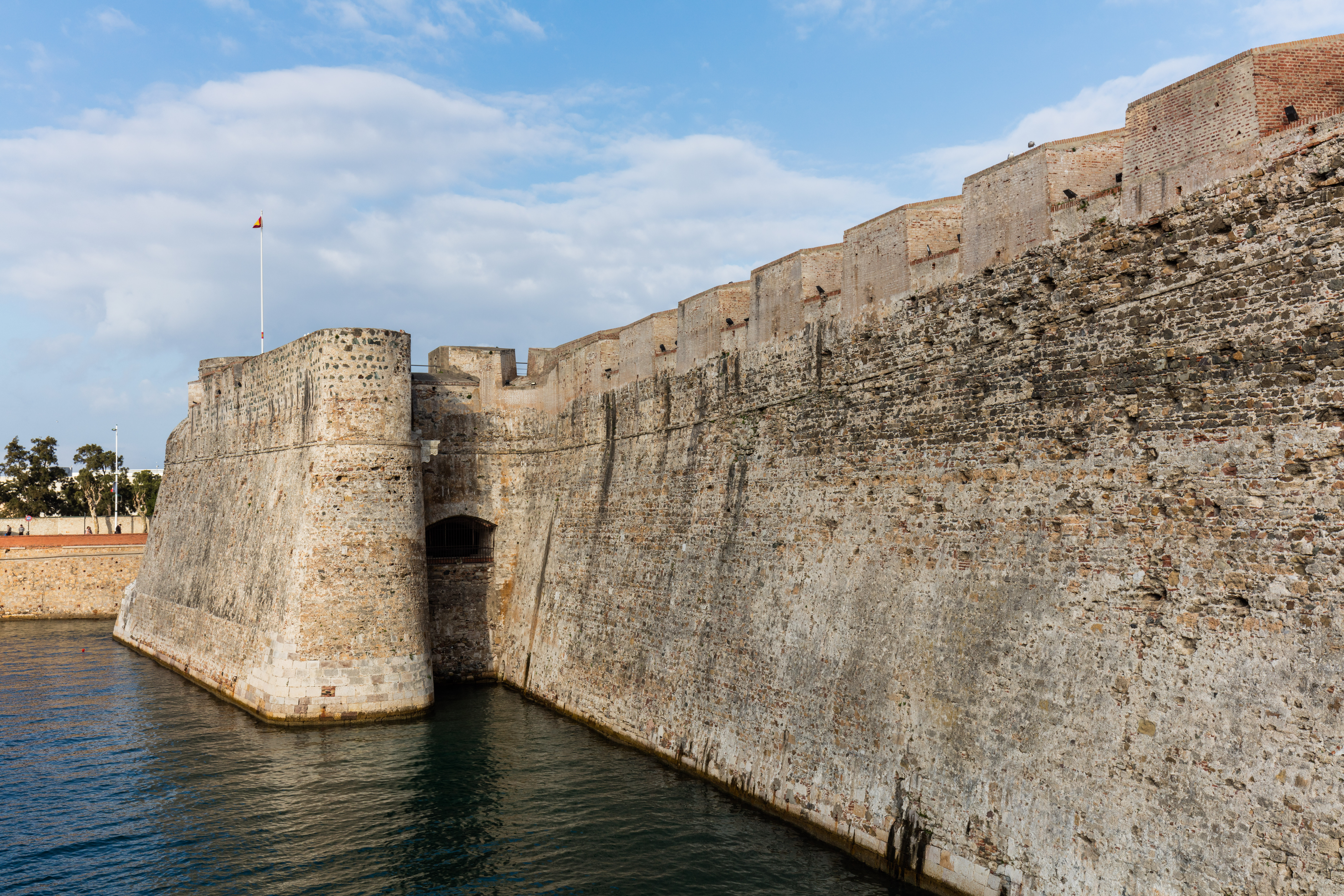

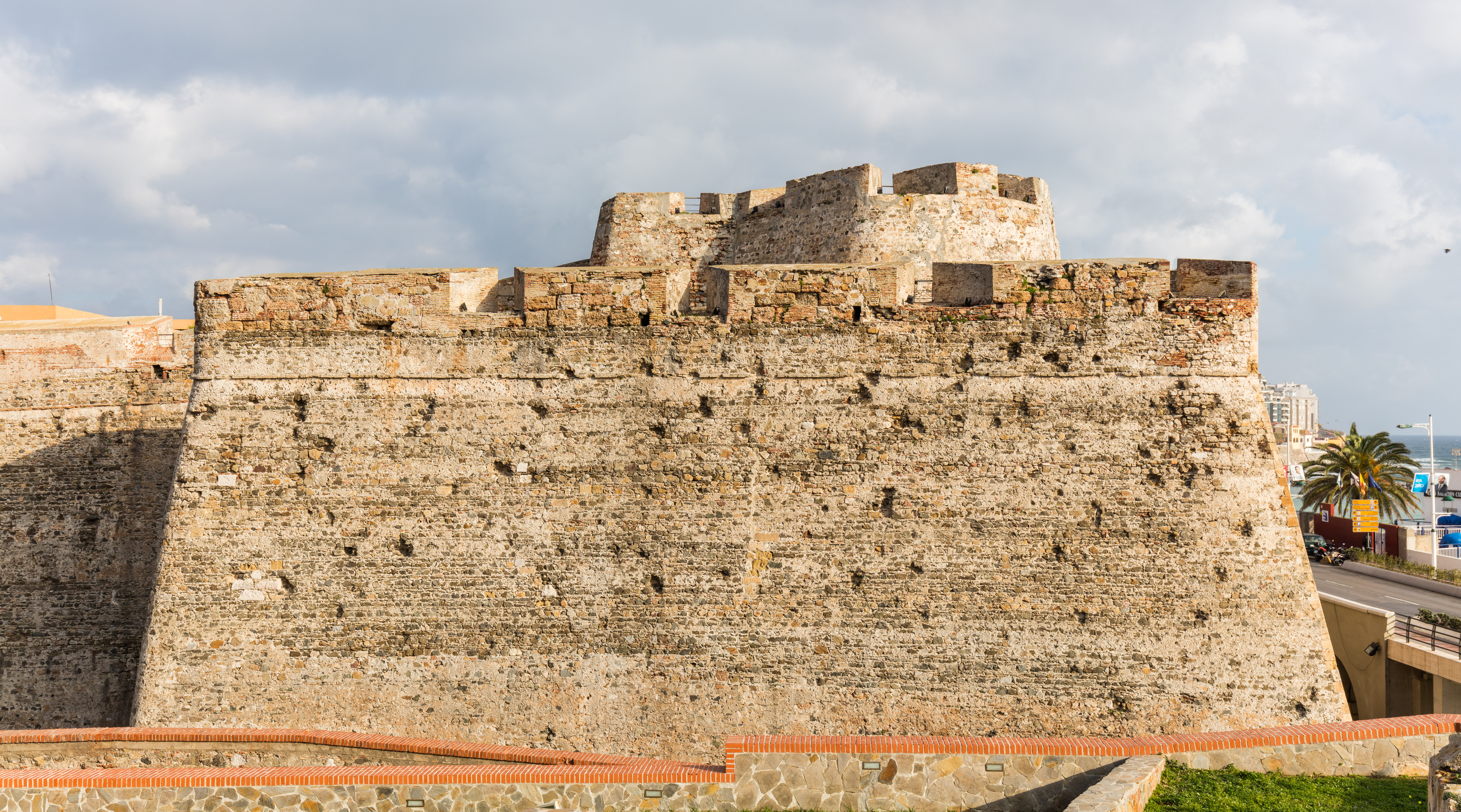

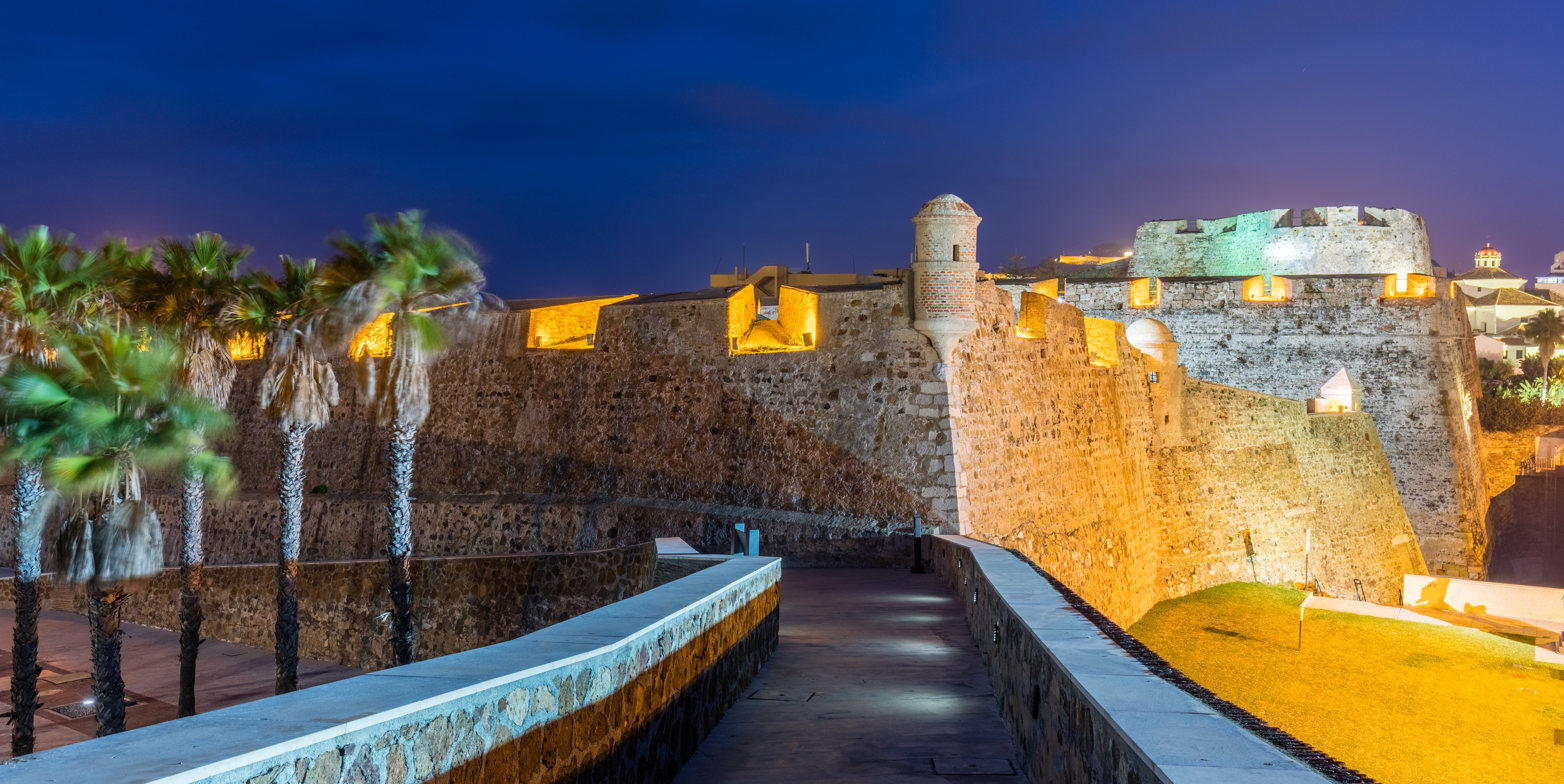

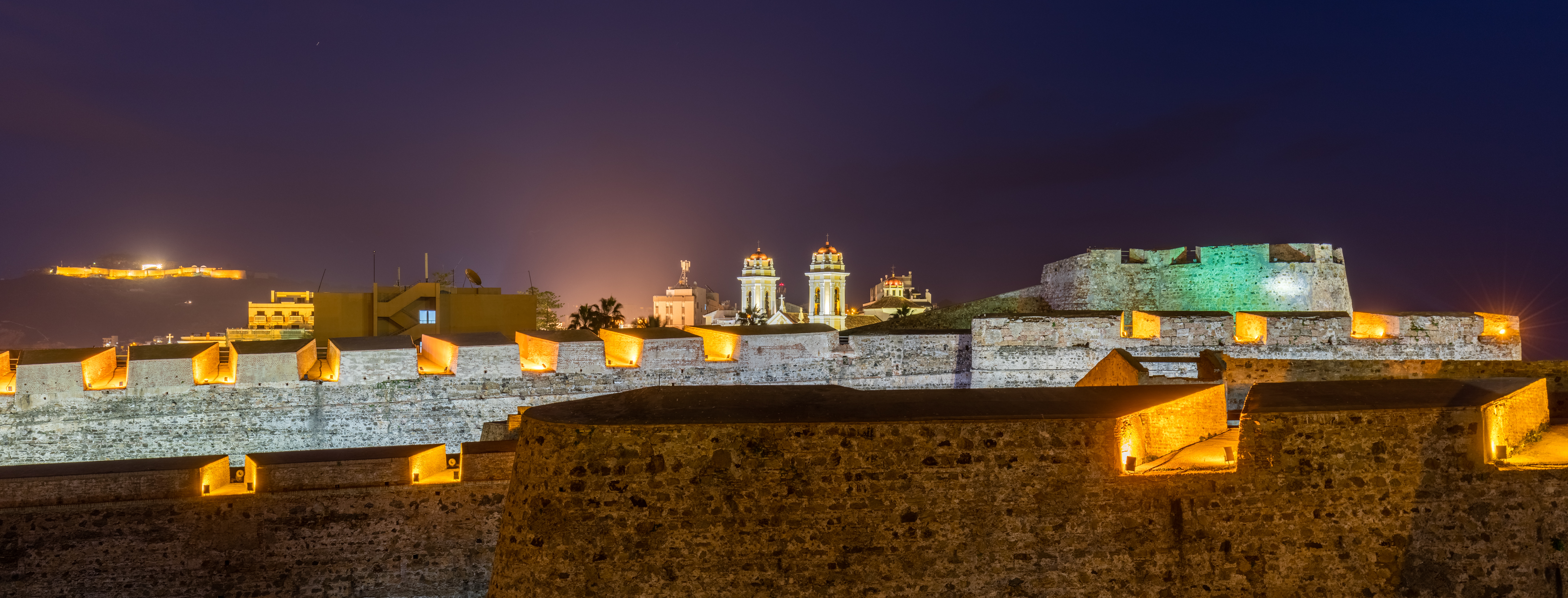
