= João de Castilho =

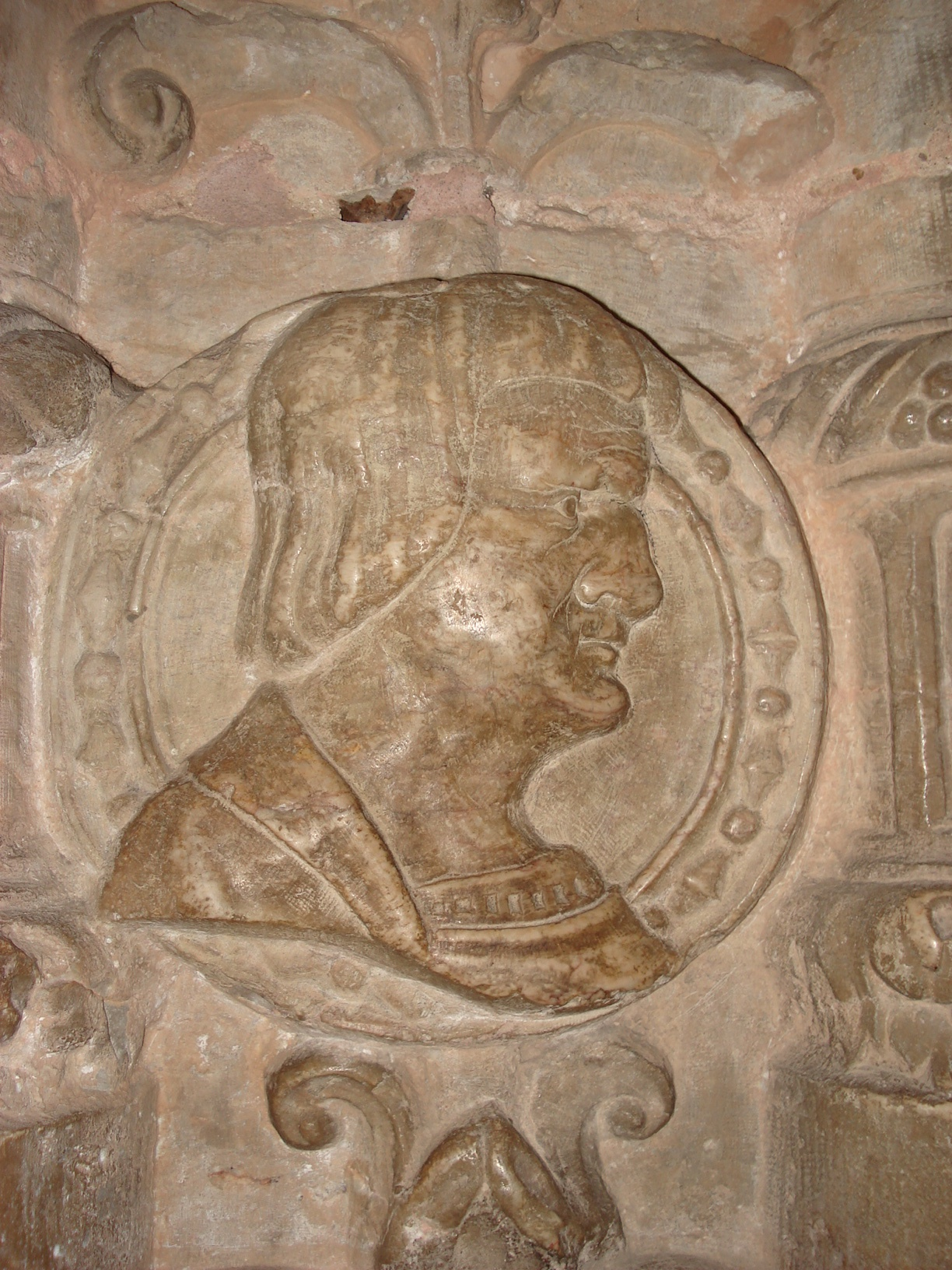
- Born: 1470
- Died: 1552 (aged 81–82)
- Other name: Juan de Castillo
- Known for: Architecture
- Notable work: World Heritage Buildings
- Movement: Renaissance

João de Castilho (c. 1470 – c. 1552), also known as Juan de Castillo, was a Castilian and a notable Iberian architect born in Castillo Siete Villas, actually Arnuero (Cantabria). He is recognisably one of the premier architects in the history of Portugal (where he developed most of his work), responsible for several World Heritage buildings. He was a Spanish-Portuguese master builder and architect originally from Cantabria (former Kingdom of Castile; present-day Spain), who developed his mature career in Portugal, where he settled in c. 1508. He is considered the greatest Iberian architect of the 16th century and one of the greatest in Renaissance Europe.

Trained in the gothic style, his activity made its mark during the Manueline period, after which he played a decisive role in affirming the Renaissance style in Portugal. João de Castilho was one of the major protagonists of a decided shift towards classicism. His career also highlights the gradual promotion of the position of master mason (medieval) to that of architect – in the modern sense of the word – with the corresponding recognition and rise in social status.

Author of a vast and notable body of built work, João de Castilho is linked to the building of five historic monuments classified by UNESCO as World Heritage, two significant highlights being the Jerónimos Monastery and the Convent of Christ. Among many other works for which he was responsible, he also contributed to the Alcobaça Monastery, the Batalha Monastery and the Mazagão Fortress (El Jadida), also classified as World Heritage.

In 2022, Indonesian composer & pianist Ananda Sukarlan composed "Castillo Reconstruido" to commemorate his 550th anniversary, commissioned by the Arnuero International Chamber Music Competition in Spain. The 10-minute piece is for piano, accordion, cello and clarinet.

== Career ==
Castilho began working on the Cathedral in Burgos, before advancing to the Cathedral of Seville in his early career. From Seville he was summoned by the Archbishop of Braga, D. Diogo de Sousa, in 1509, to work on the chapel of the Sé Cathedral

Following this period, he worked on the parochial Church of São João Baptista in Vila do Conde, where he lived for a time. The city was economically prosperous due to its imports-exports activity through the port.

From Vila do Conde, João de Castilho began working in the Convent of Christ in Tomar. There he executed the celebrated gate and portico to the Church, responding to the beautiful Manueline window produced by Diogo de Arruda. His efforts were rewarded, when he was given the task of managing the public works at the Convent, which he maintained until his death.

In 1517, he succeeded Diogo Boitaca as director of public works at the Monastery of the Jeronimos, where he designed the extraordinary southern portico (along with Gil Vicente, author of the Belém Monstrance).

He worked on five World Heritage Sites:

- Convent of Christ (Tomar)
- Jerónimos Monastery
- El Jadida
- Batalha Monastery
- Alcobaça Monastery.

== Gallery ==
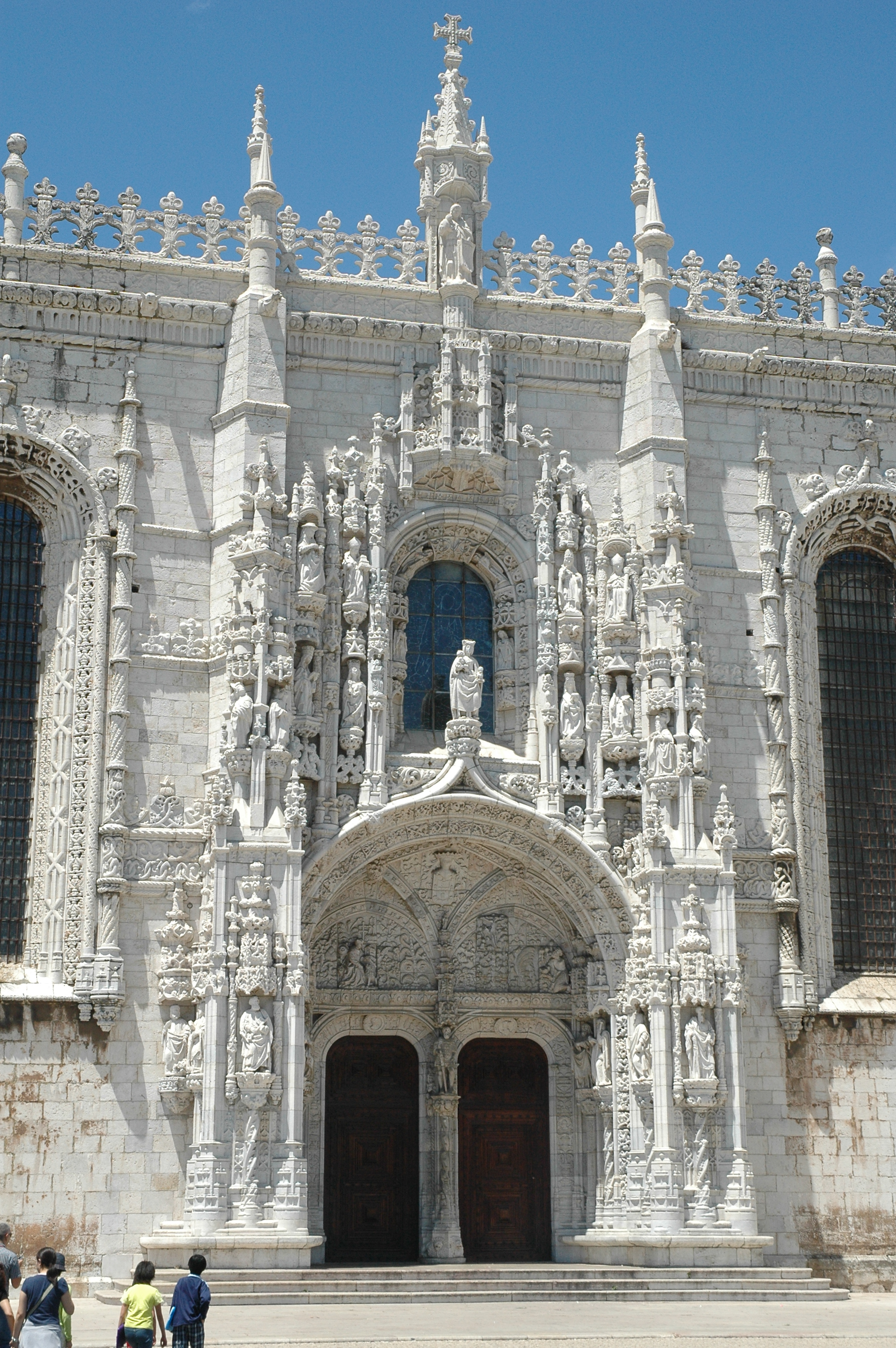
Jerónimos. The ornate Manueline south portal.

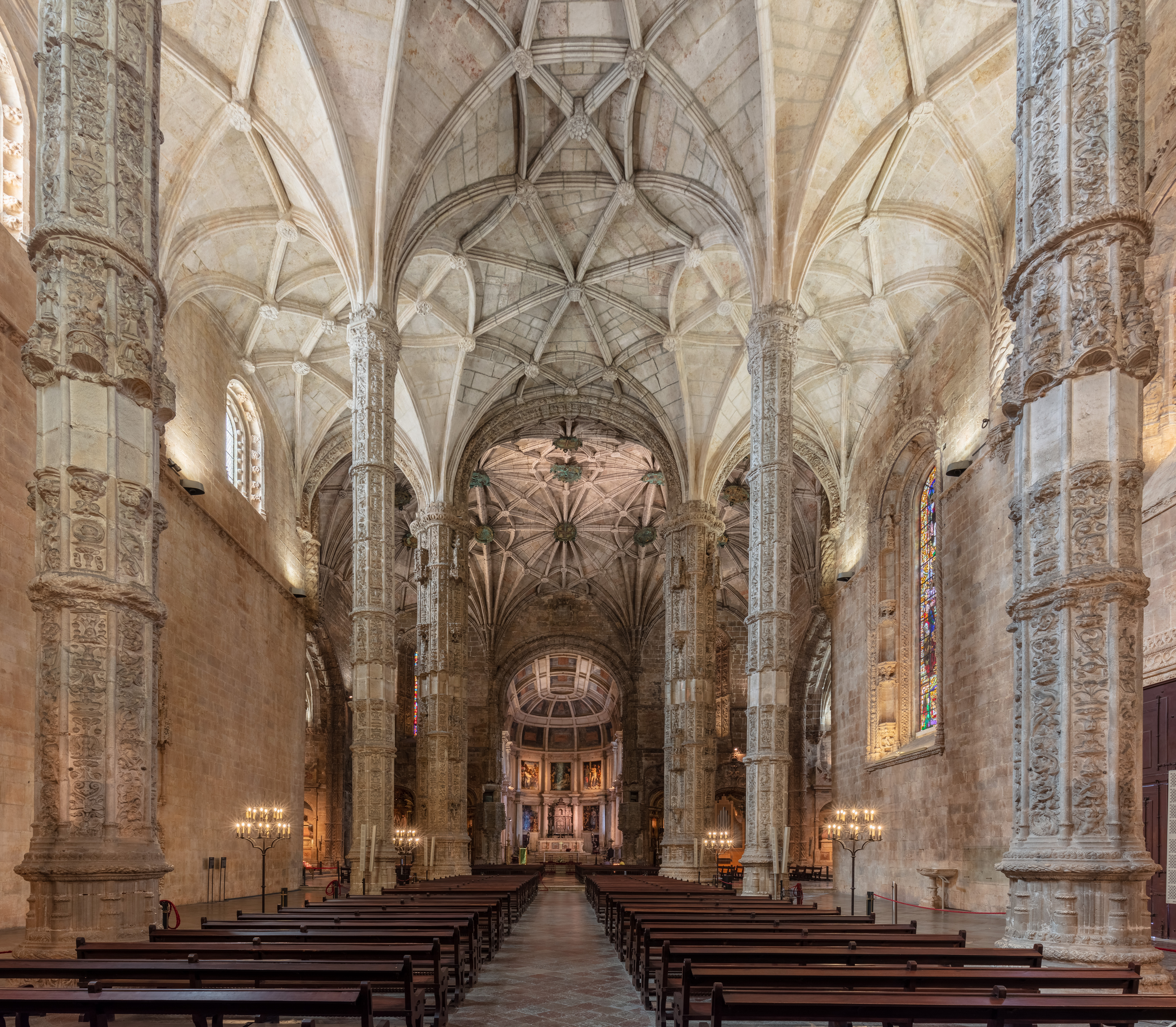
Jeróminos.Interior viewed towards the main chapel.

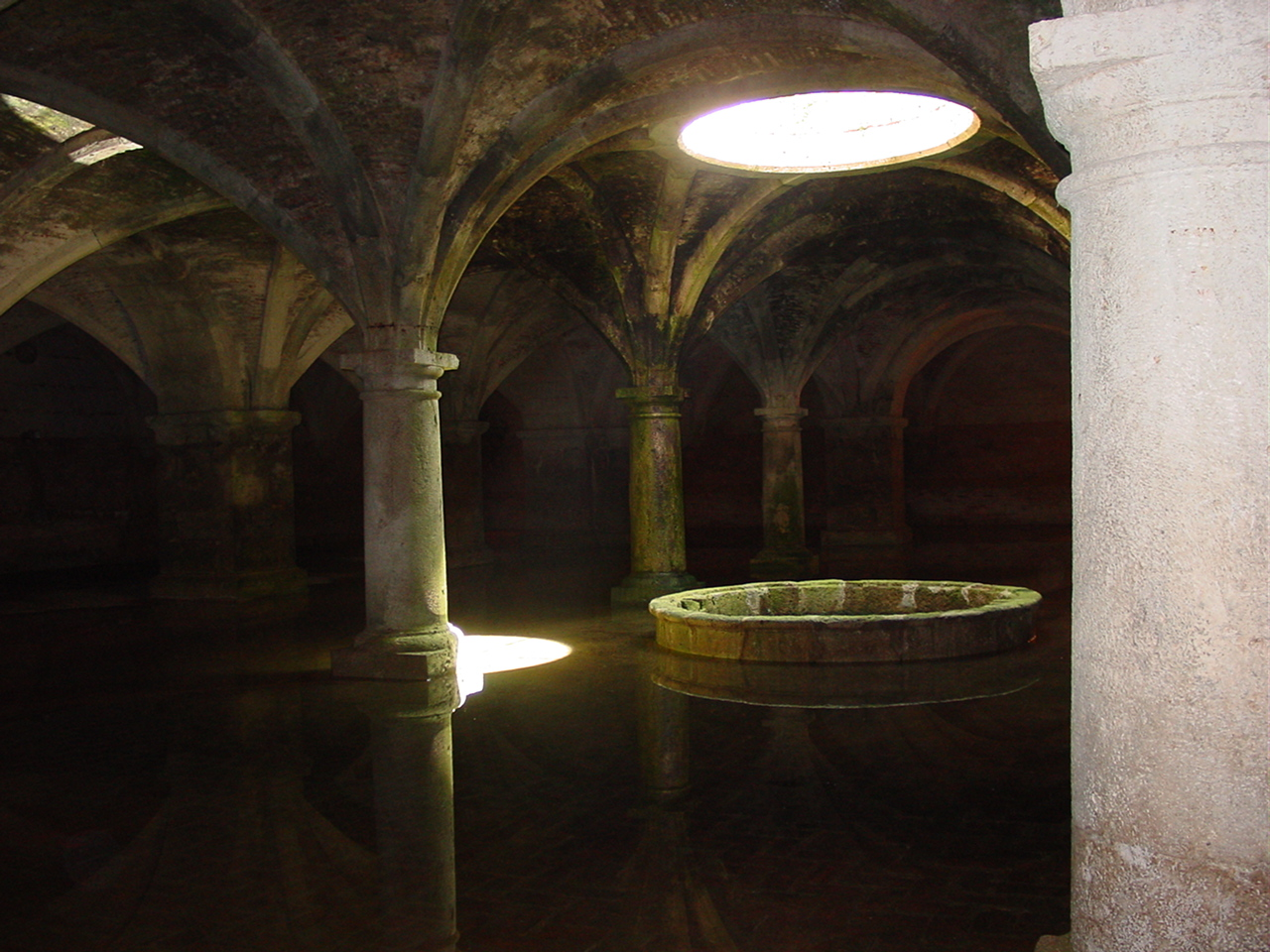
Cistern of the El Jadida fortress.

Convent of Christ (Tomar). Portal

Jerónimos. Two-storey cloisters.
