= Portuguese Gothic architecture =

Portuguese Gothic architecture is the architectural style prevalent in Portugal in the Late Middle Ages. As in other parts of Europe, Gothic style slowly replaced Romanesque architecture in the period between the late 12th and the 13th century. Between the late 15th and early 16th century, Gothic was replaced by Renaissance architecture through an intermediate style called Manueline.

Central aisle of the church of Alcobaça Monastery (12th–13th century)

== Churches and monasteries ==
Gothic architecture was brought to Portugal by the Cistercian Order. The first fully Gothic building in Portugal is the church of the Monastery of Alcobaça, a magnificent example of the clear and simple architectural forms favoured by the Cistercians. The church was built between 1178 and 1252 in three phases, and seems inspired by the Abbey of Clairvaux, in the Champagne. Its three aisles are very tall and slender, giving an exceptional impression of height. The whole church is covered by rib vaulting and the main chapel has an ambulatory and a series of radiant chapels. The vault of the ambulatory is externally supported by flying buttresses, typical features of Gothic architecture and a novelty at the time in Portugal.

After the foundation of Alcobaça, the Gothic style was chiefly disseminated by mendicant orders (mainly Franciscan, Augustinians and Dominicans). Along the 13th and 14th centuries, several convents were founded in urban centres, important examples of which can be found in Porto (São Francisco Church), Coimbra (Monastery of Santa Clara-a-Velha), Guimarães (São Francisco, São Domingos), Santarém (São Francisco, Santa Clara), Elvas (São Domingos), Lisbon (ruins of Carmo Convent) and many other places. Mendicant Gothic churches usually had a three-aisled nave covered with wooden roof and an apse with three chapels covered with rib vaulting. These churches also lacked towers and were mostly devoid of architectural decoration, in tone with mendicant ideals. Mendicant Gothic was also adopted in several parish churches built all over the country, for instance in Sintra (Santa Maria), Mafra, Lourinhã and Loulé.

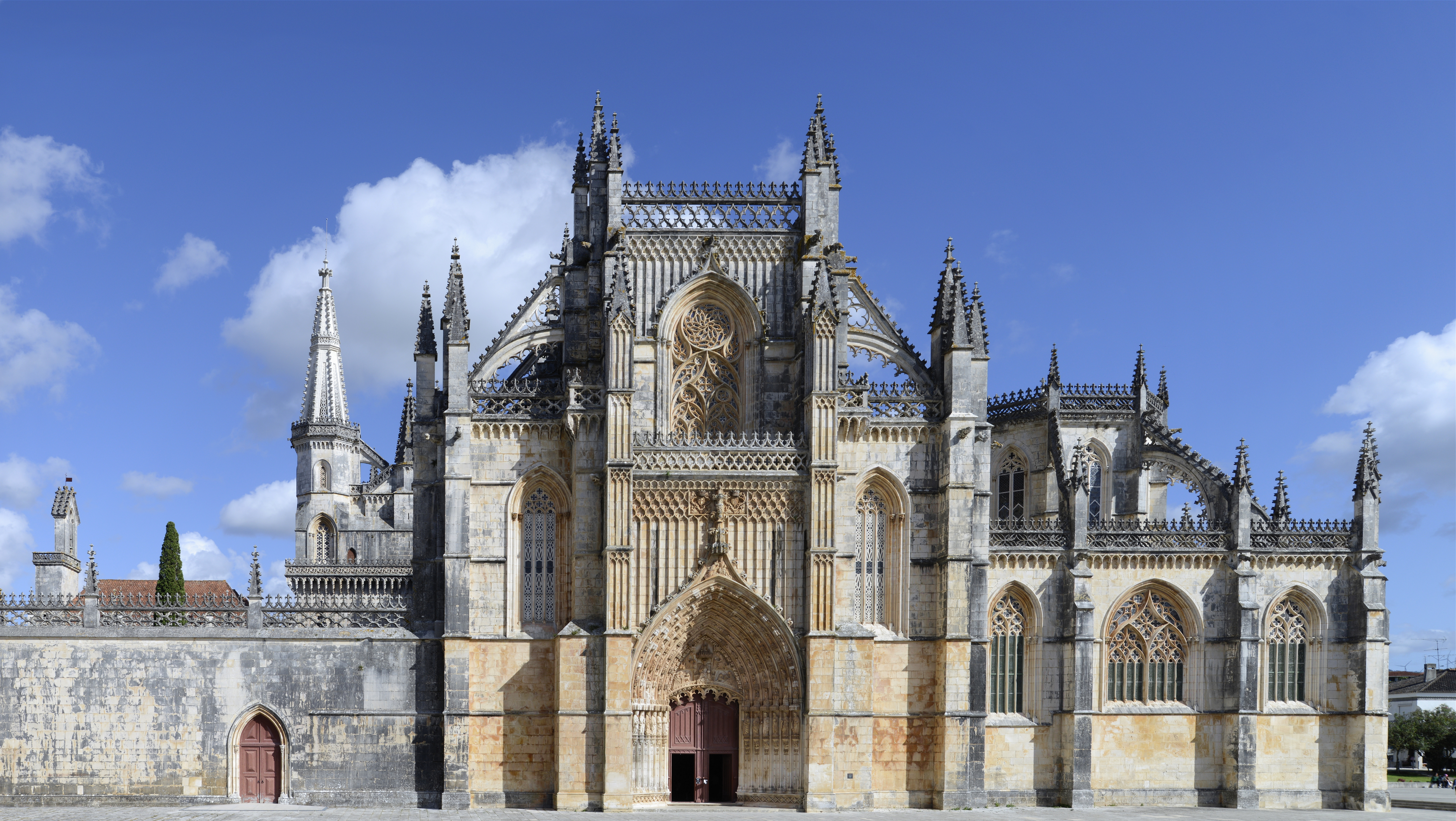
Flamboyant Gothic in the Monastery of Batalha: church façade (left) and Founder's Chapel (right)

Many of the Romanesque cathedrals were modernised with Gothic elements. Thus, the Romanesque nave of Porto Cathedral is supported by flying buttresses, one of the first built in Portugal (early 13th century). The apse of Lisbon Cathedral was totally remodelled in the first half of the 14th century, when it gained a Gothic ambulatory illuminated by a clerestory (high row of windows on the upper storey). The ambulatory has a series of radiant chapels illuminated with large windows, contrasting with the dark Romanesque nave of the cathedral. An important transitional building is Évora Cathedral, built during the 13th century; even though its floorplan, façade and elevation are inspired by Lisbon Cathedral, its forms (arches, windows, vaults) are already Gothic. Many Gothic churches maintained the fortress-like appearance of Romanesque times, like the already-mentioned Évora Cathedral, the Church of the Monastery of Leça do Balio (14th century) near Matosinhos, and even as late as the 15th-century, with the Main Church of Viana do Castelo.

Several Gothic cloisters were built and can still be found in the Cathedrals of Porto, Lisbon and Évora (all from the 14th century) as well as in monasteries like Alcobaça, Monastery of Santo Tirso and the Convent of the Order of Christ.

In the early 15th century, the building of the Monastery of Batalha, sponsored by King John I, led to a renovation of Portuguese Gothic. After 1402, the works were trusted to Master Huguet, of unknown origin, who introduced the Flamboyant Gothic style to the project. The whole building is decorated with Gothic pinnacles (crockets), reliefs, large windows with intricate tracery and elaborate crenellations. The main portal has a series of archivolts decorated with a multitude of statues, while the tympanum has a relief showing Christ and the Evangelists. The Founder's Chapel and the Chapter House have elaborate star-ribbed vaulting, unknown in Portugal until then. Batalha influenced 15th-century workshops like those of Guarda Cathedral, Silves Cathedral and monasteries in Beja (Nossa Senhora da Conceição) and Santarém (Igreja da Graça).

Another Gothic variant was the so-called Mudéjar-Gothic, which developed in Portugal towards the end of the 15th century, especially in the Alentejo region. The name Mudéjar refers to the influence of Islamic art in the Christian kingdoms of the Iberian Peninsula, especially in the Middle Ages. In the Alentejo and elsewhere, Mudéjar influence in several buildings is evident in the profile of windows and portals, often with horseshoe arches and a mullion, circular turrets with conical pinnacles, Islamic merlons, etc., as well as tile (azulejo) decoration. Examples include the portico of St Francis Church of Évora, the courtyard of the Sintra Royal Palace and several churches and palaces in Évora, Elvas, Arraiolos, Beja, etc. Múdejar eventually intermingled with the Manueline style in the early 16th century.

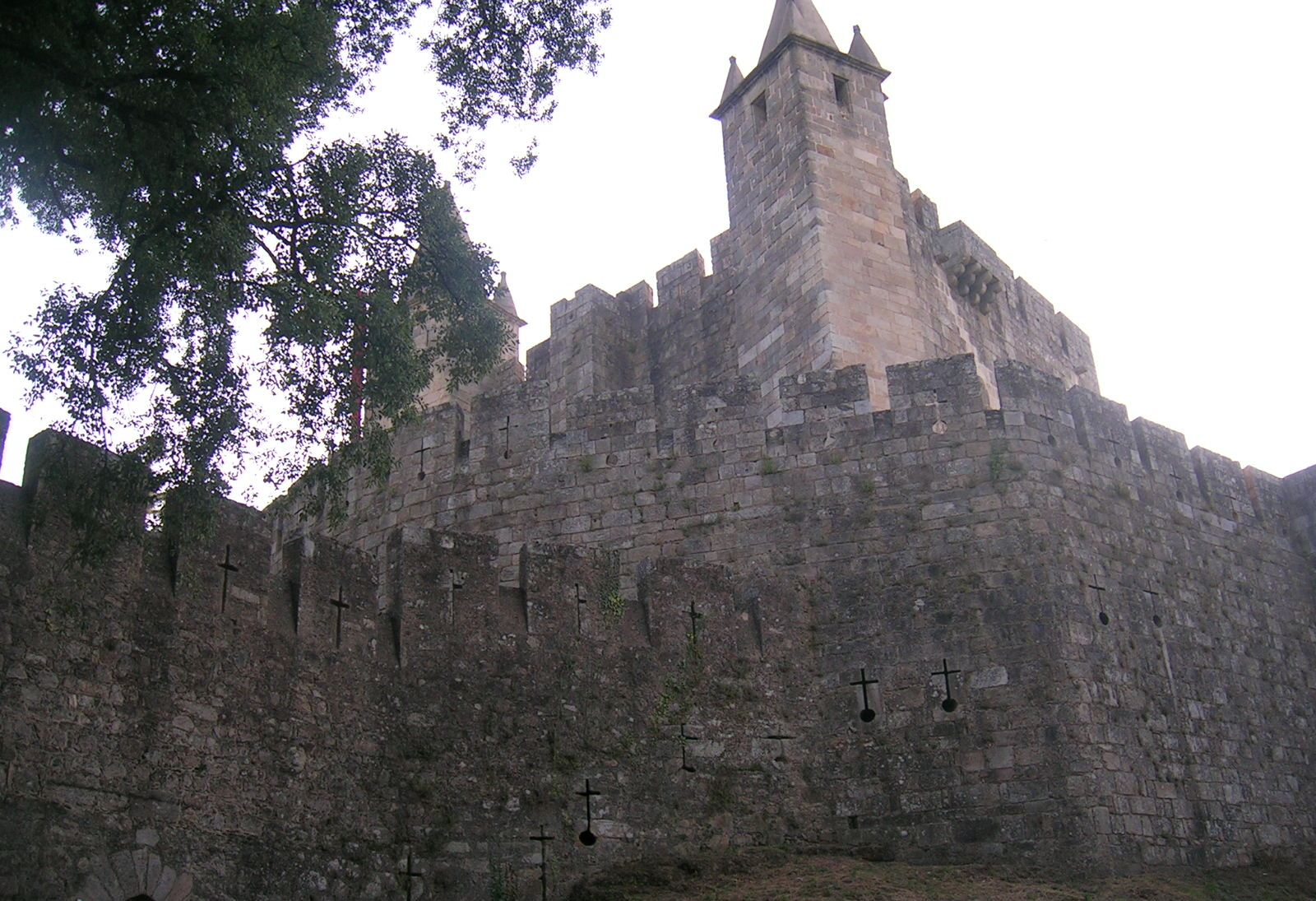
View of Santa Maria da Feira Castle. The Keep is unique in the world with its four pinnacles of four towers stuck in the main tower.

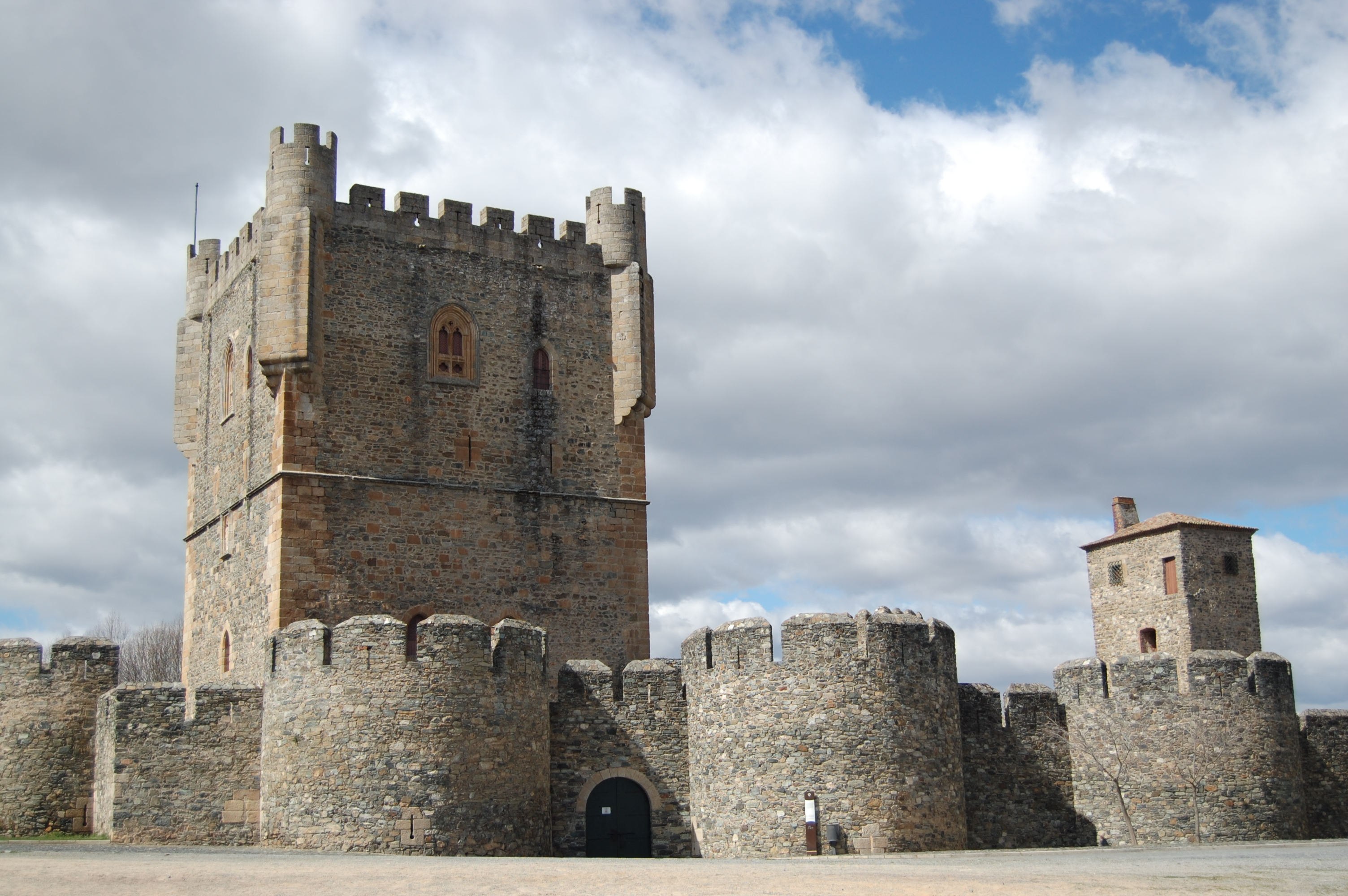
View of Bragança Castle. The large keep tower was built in the 15th century.

== Castles and palaces ==
During the Gothic era, several castles had to be either built or reinforced, especially along the border with the Kingdom of Castille. Compared to previous castles, Gothic castles in Portugal tended to have more towers, often of circular or semi-circular plan (to increase resistance to projectiles), keep towers tended to be polygonal, and castle gates were often defended by a pair of flanking towers. A second, lower wall curtain (barbicans) were often built along the perimeter of the main walls to prevent war machines from approaching the castle. Features like machicolations and improved arrowslits became also widespread.

Starting in the 14th century, keep towers became larger and more sophisticated, with rib vaulting roofs and facilities like fireplaces. Keep towers with improved residential characteristics can be found in the castles of Beja, Estremoz and Bragança, while some later castles (15th century) became real palaces, like those in Penedono, Ourém and Porto de Mós. The most significant case is the Castle of Leiria, turned into a royal palace by King John I. Some rooms of the palace are decorated with splendid Gothic loggias, from which the surrounding landscape could be appreciated by the King and Queen.

== Notable examples ==
Cloisters and church of the Monastery of Alcobaça

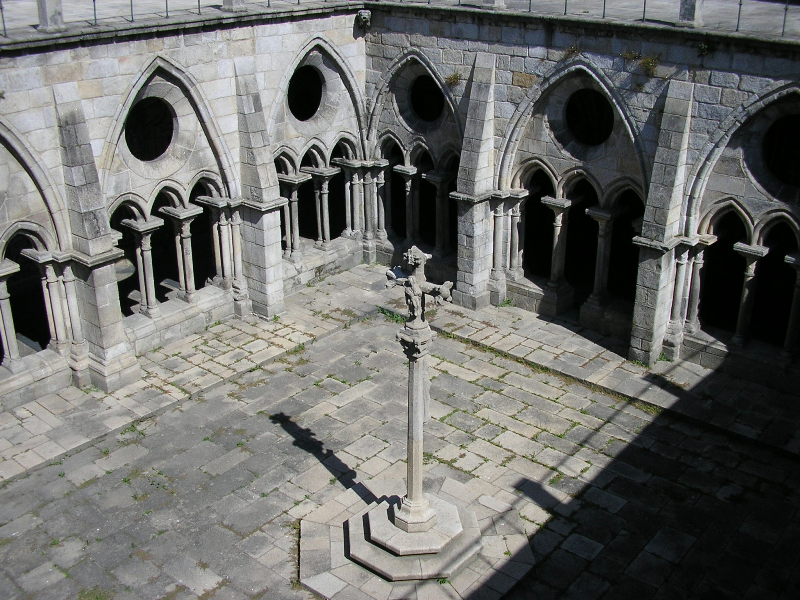
Cloisters of Porto Cathedral (14th century)

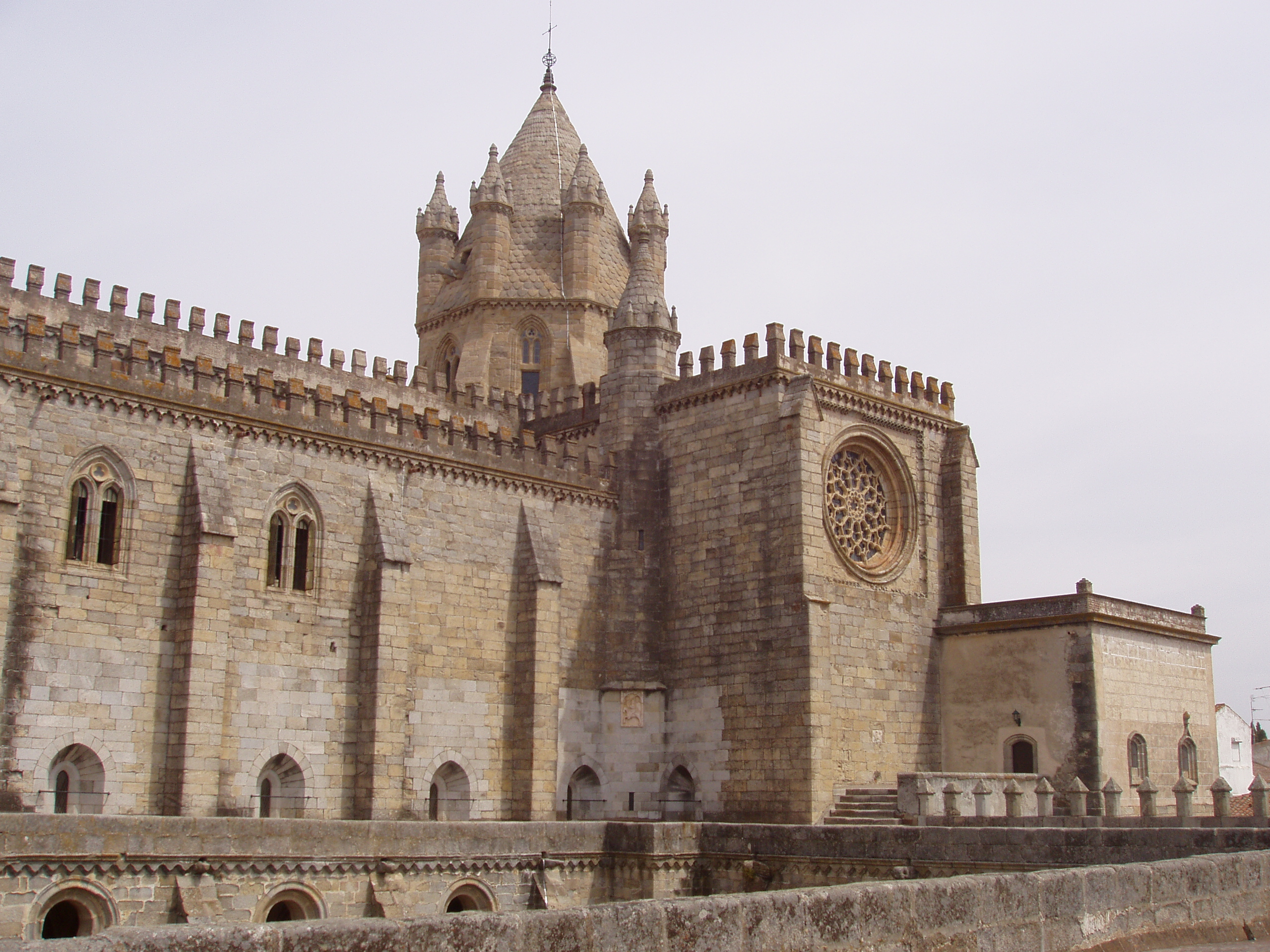
Transept and lantern-tower of Évora Cathedral (13th century)

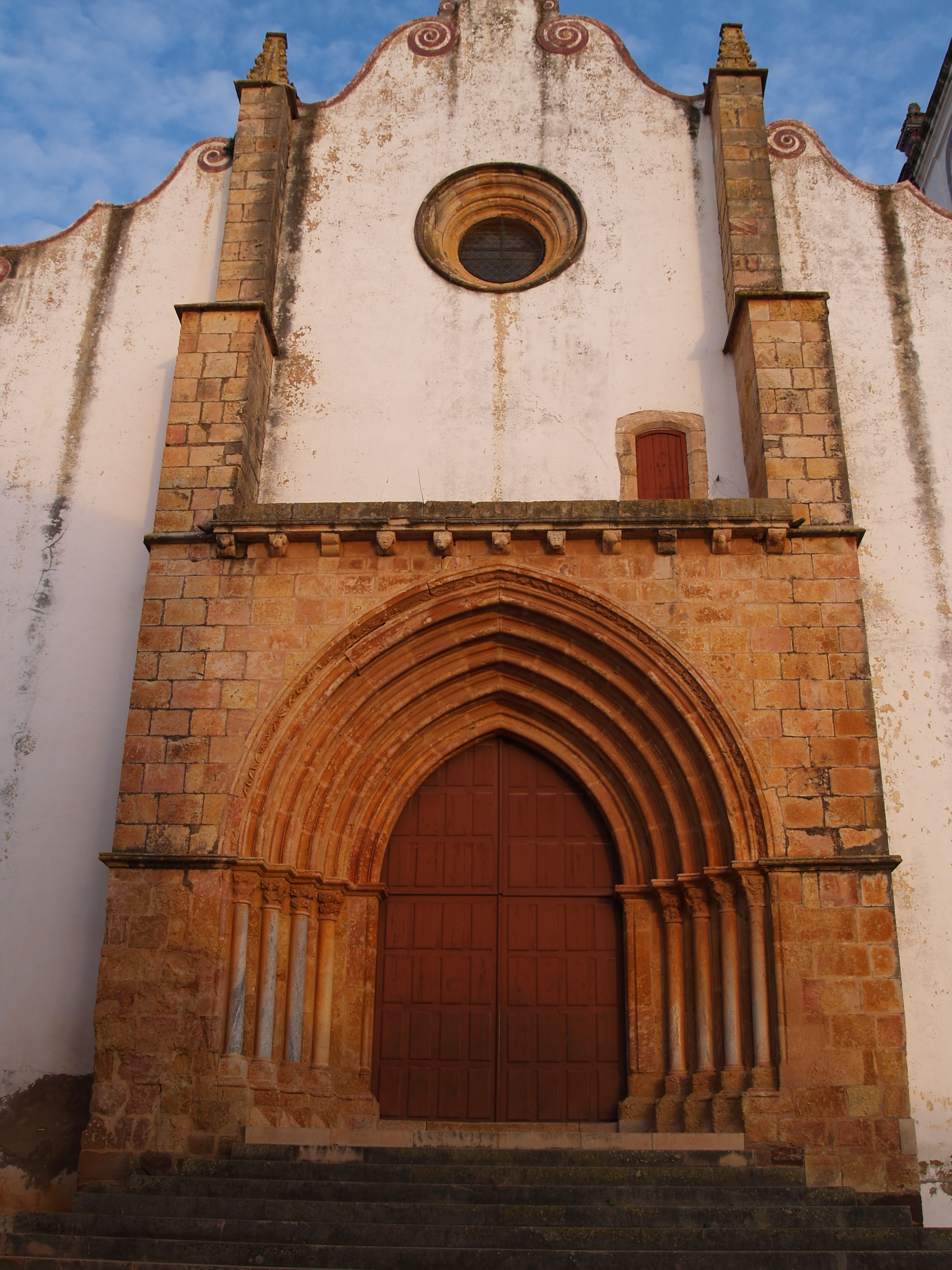
Main façade of Silves Cathedral (15th century)

Cloisters of Évora Cathedral (14th century)

Mudéjar-Gothic: main façade of St Francis of Évora (late 15th century)

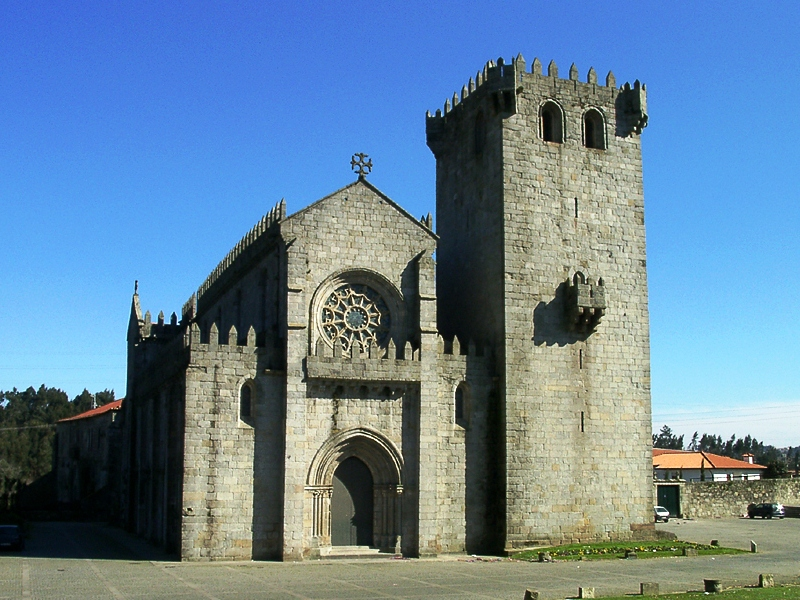
Leça do Balio Monastery, Matosinhos (14th century)

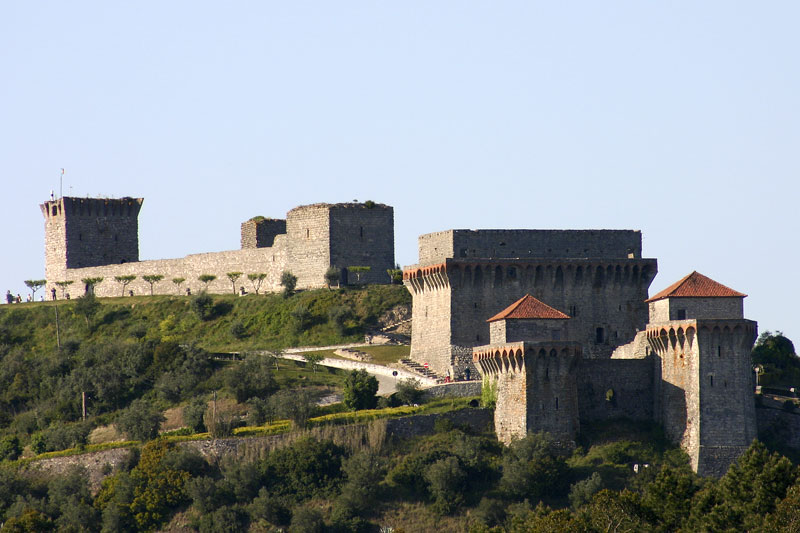
Castle of Ourém (15th century)

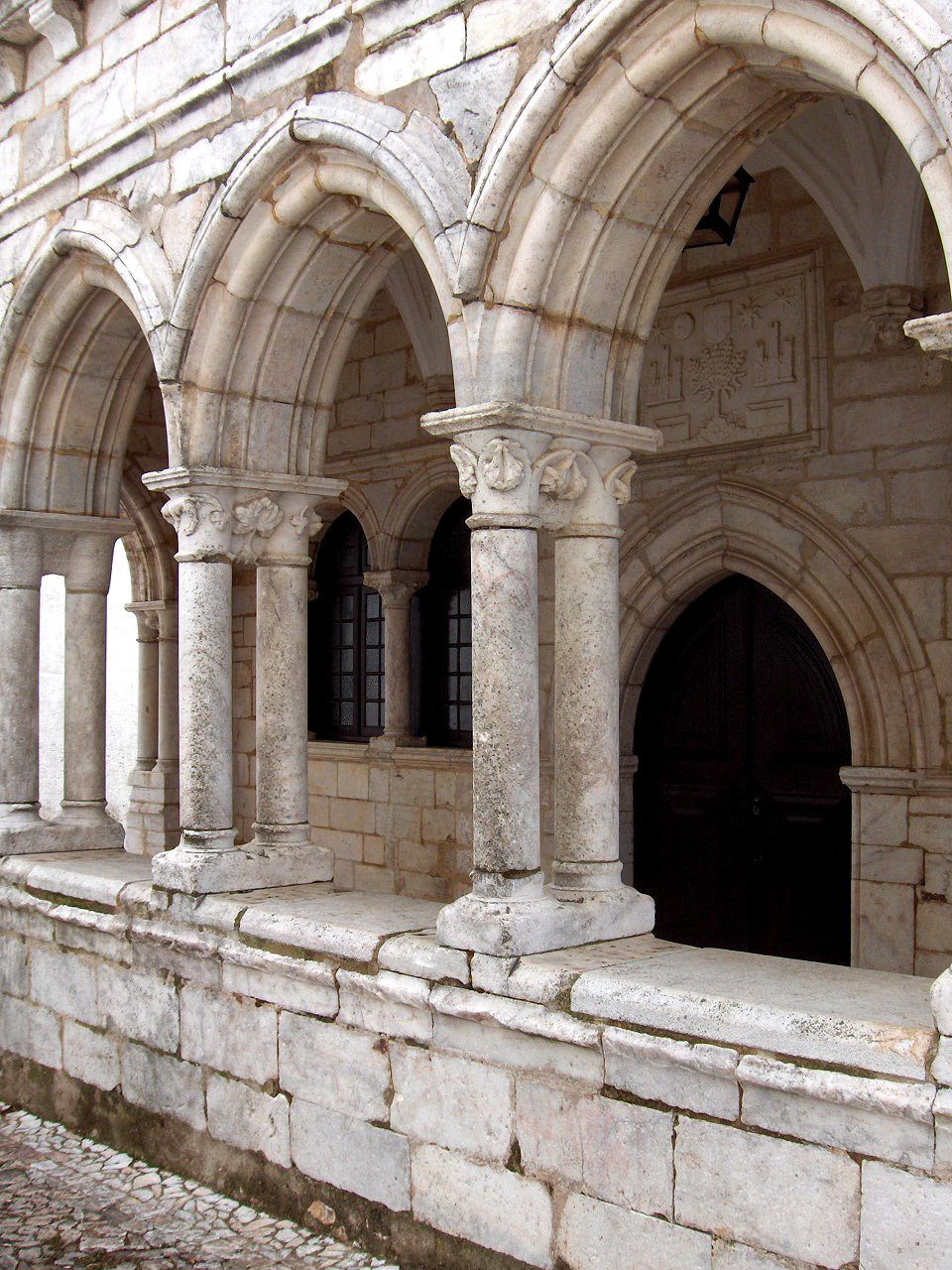
Gothic porch in Estremoz Castle

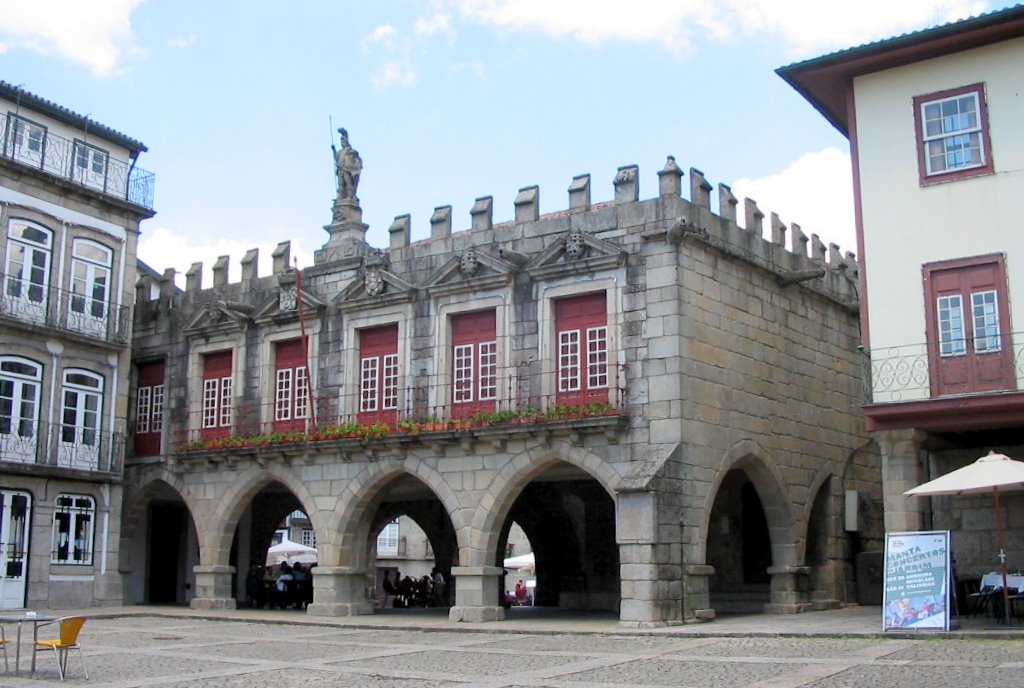
Municipality of Guimarães with Gothic gallery (early 16th century)

Star rib-vaulting of the Founder's Chapel of the Monastery of Batalha (15th century)

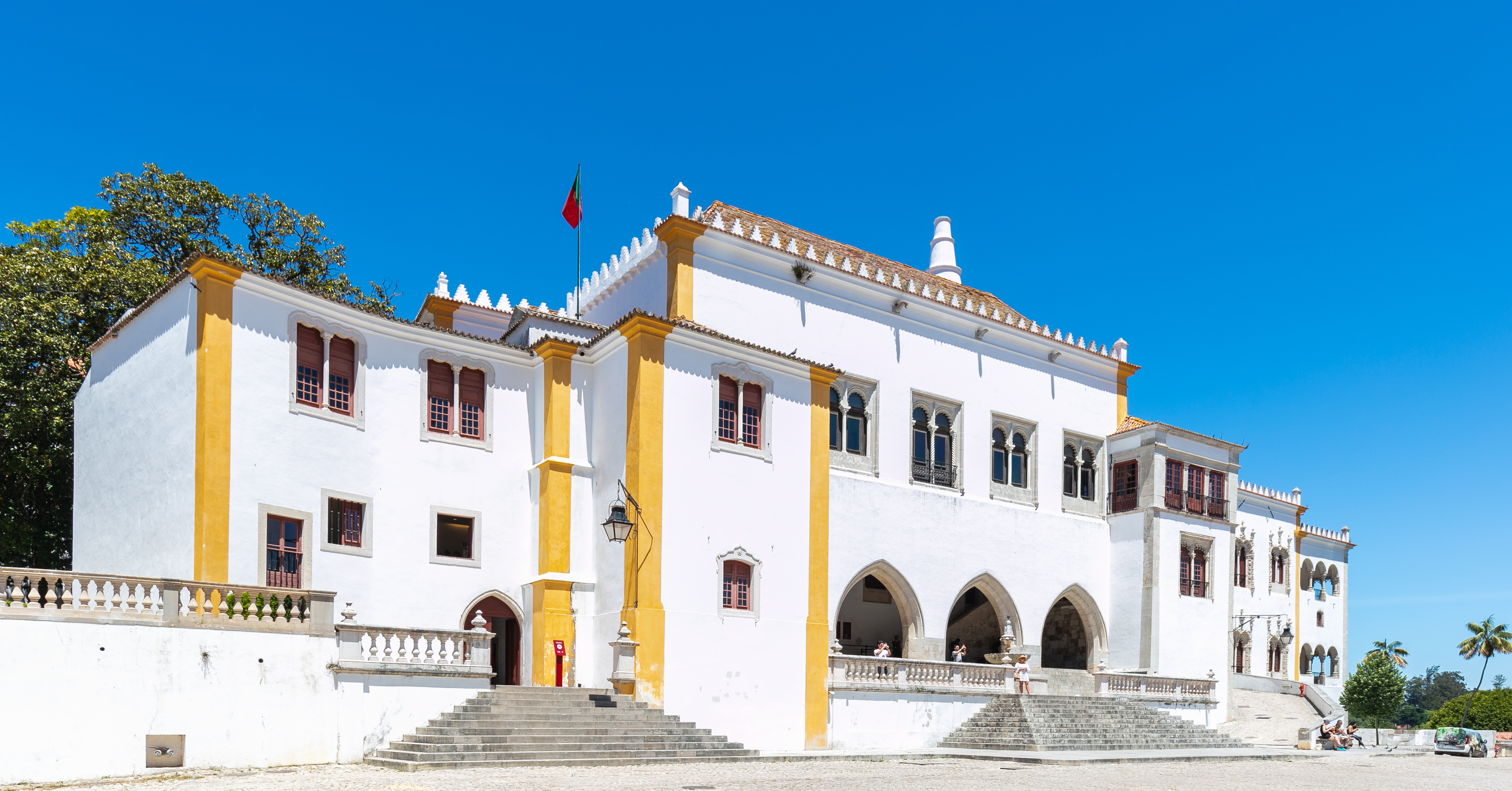
Sintra National Palace (15th–16th centuries)

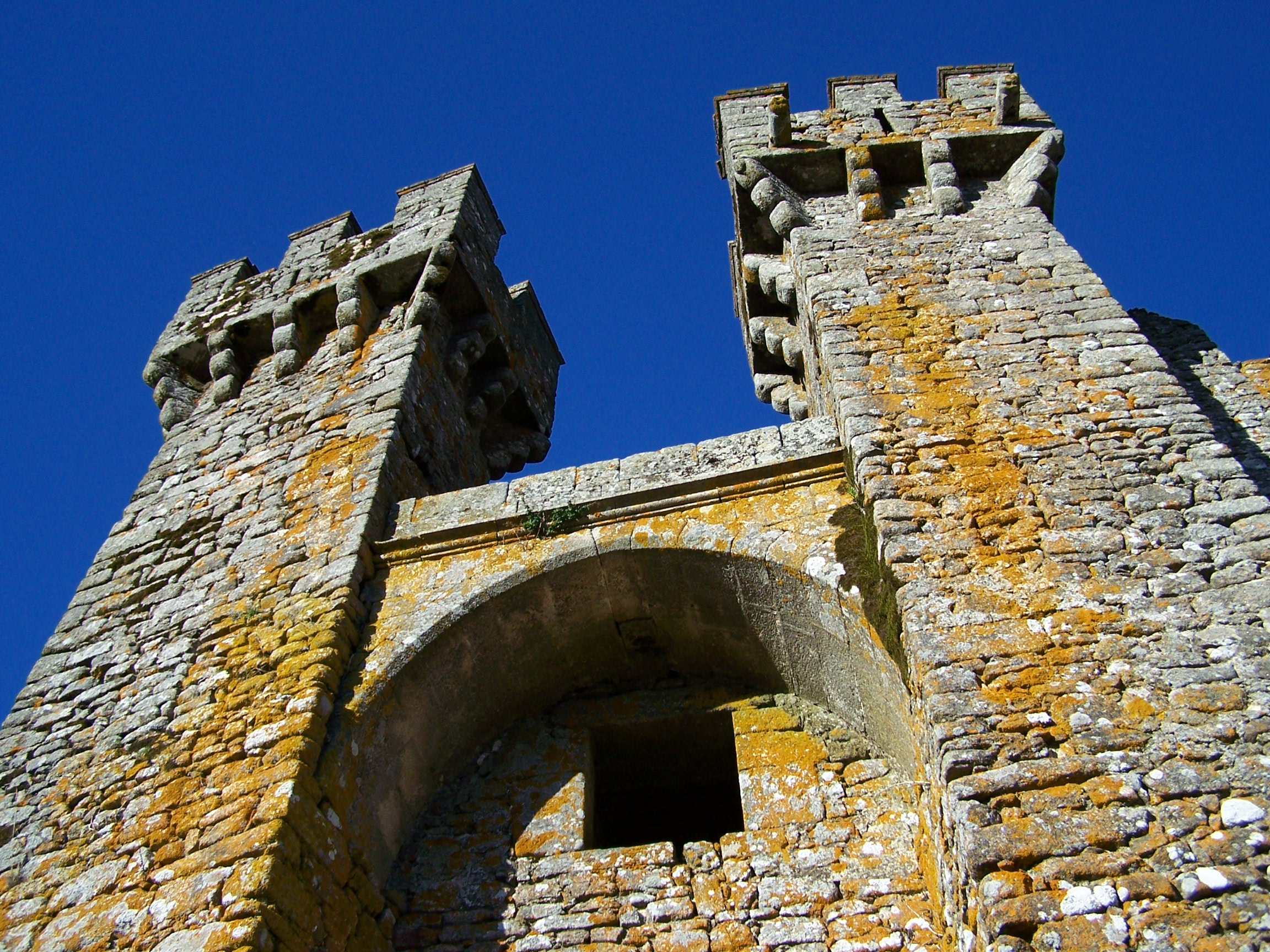
Entrance towers of Penedono Castle (15th century)

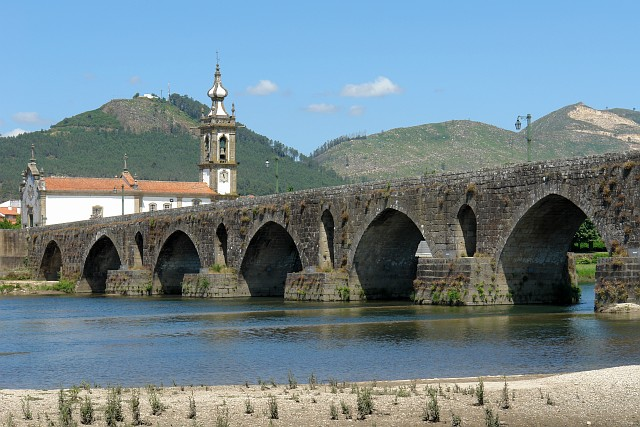
Gothic bridge of Ponte de Lima

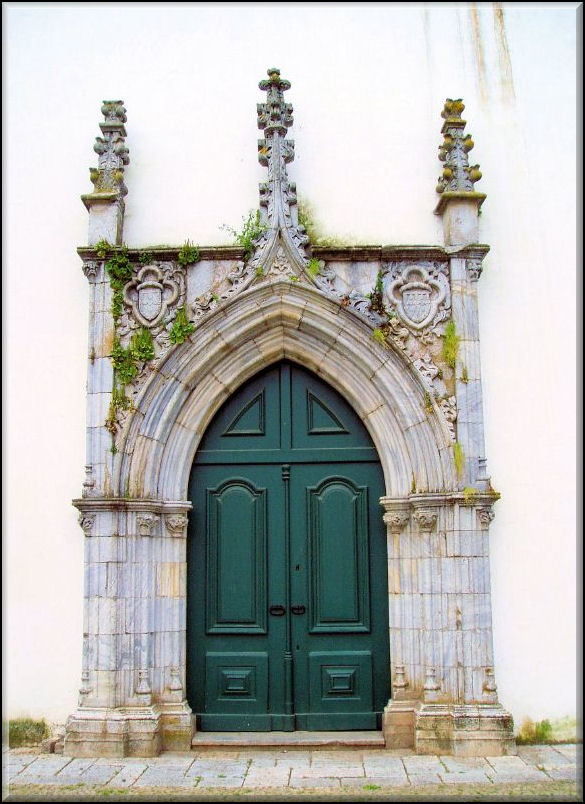
Portal of the Our Lady Convent in Beja (15th century)

== See also ==
- Portuguese architecture
- Neo-Manueline
- gothicmed
