= Setúbal (disambiguation) =

Setúbal is the main city in Setúbal Municipality, Portugal.

Setúbal may also refer to:

- Setúbal District, a district in Portugal.
- Setúbal Municipality, a municipality in Setúbal peninsula.
- Setúbal Peninsula, a peninsula in Portugal.
- Setúbal DOC or Moscatel de Setúbal, a Portuguese wine produced around the Setúbal Municipality on the Península de Setúbal.
- Vitória F.C. or Vitória de Setúbal, Portuguese sports club from the city of Setúbal.
- Setúbal (surname), surname

== See also ==
- Península de Setúbal Subregion, a NUTS III subdivision of Lisbon Region (NUTS II), in Portugal.
- Setúbal Football Association, the governing body for the all football competitions in the Portuguese district of Setúbal.
- Monastery of Jesus of Setúbal, a historical religious building in the Manueline style in Setúbal.
- SS Setubal, a number of steamships of this name
