= Diogo de Boitaca =

Portuguese architect and engineer

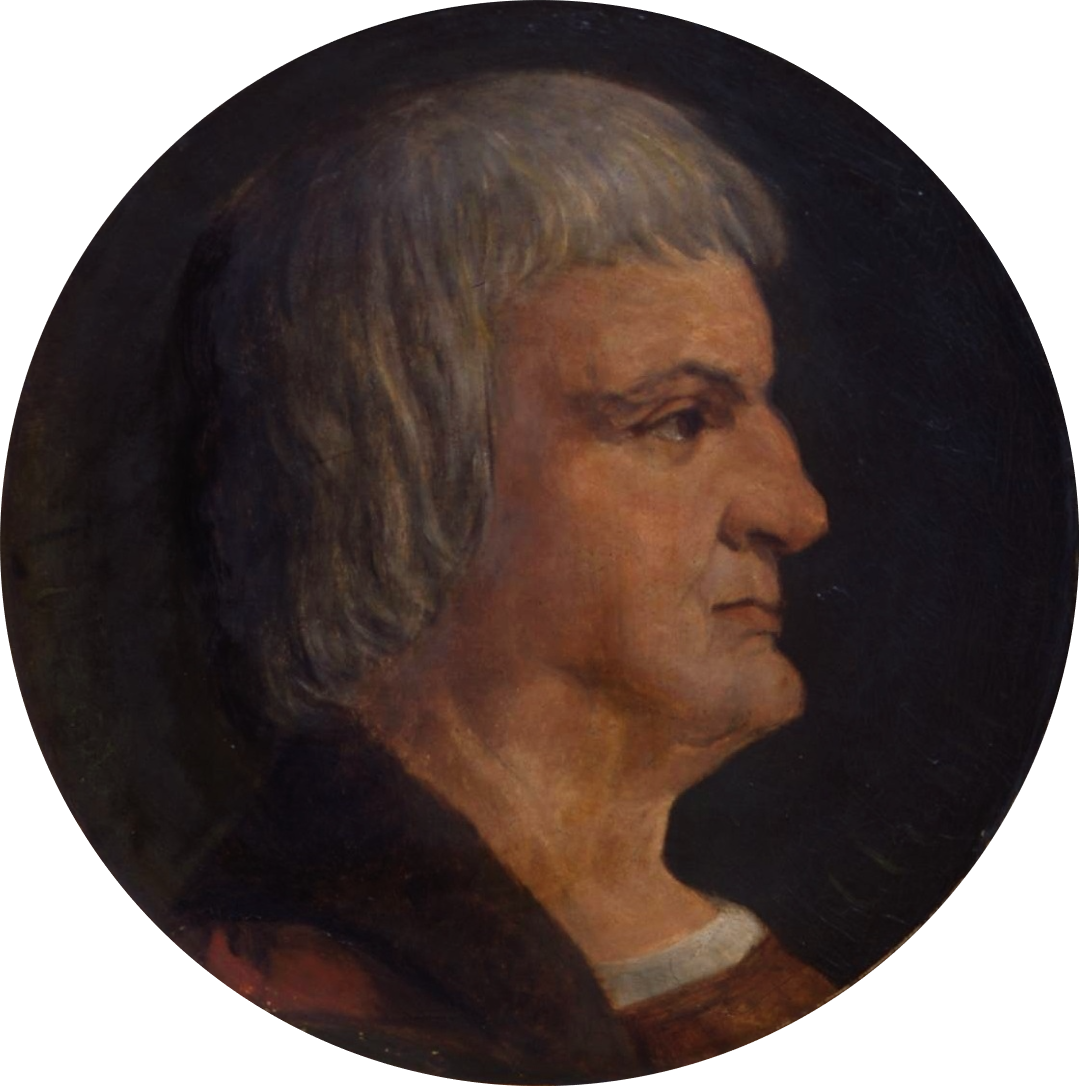
19th-century portrait of Diogo de Boitaca, Lisbon City Hall

Diogo de Boitaca (c. 1460 – 1528?) was an influential architect and engineer of some of the most important Portuguese buildings, working in Portugal in the first half of the 16th century.

== Biography ==
His name has been written in different fashions: Diogo Boytac, Diogo de Boytac, Diogo Boitaca, Diogo de Boitaca. The spelling of his name as Boitac (or Boytac) suggests that he is possibly of French origin. But, as so much in his life this is uncertain. His year of birth is equally unknown, but is estimated around 1460. He died in Batalha in 1528, but that date is also uncertain.

His family name occurs for the first time in 1498 in a document of king Manuel I, who granted him an annual allowance for his work at the Monastery of Jesus of Setúbal. His signature occurs on a document of 1514. His name is mentioned in 12 documents, kept in the Monastery of Batalha and written between 1515 and 1521. His first name is only mentioned once : in 1515 on the list of the members of the ill-fated expedition to São João da Mamora (present-day Mehdya in Morocco) where the Portuguese lost 4,000 men.

While working at the Monastery of Batalha, he married in 1512 Isabel Henriques, daughter of the Mateus Fernandes, architect at the same monastery.

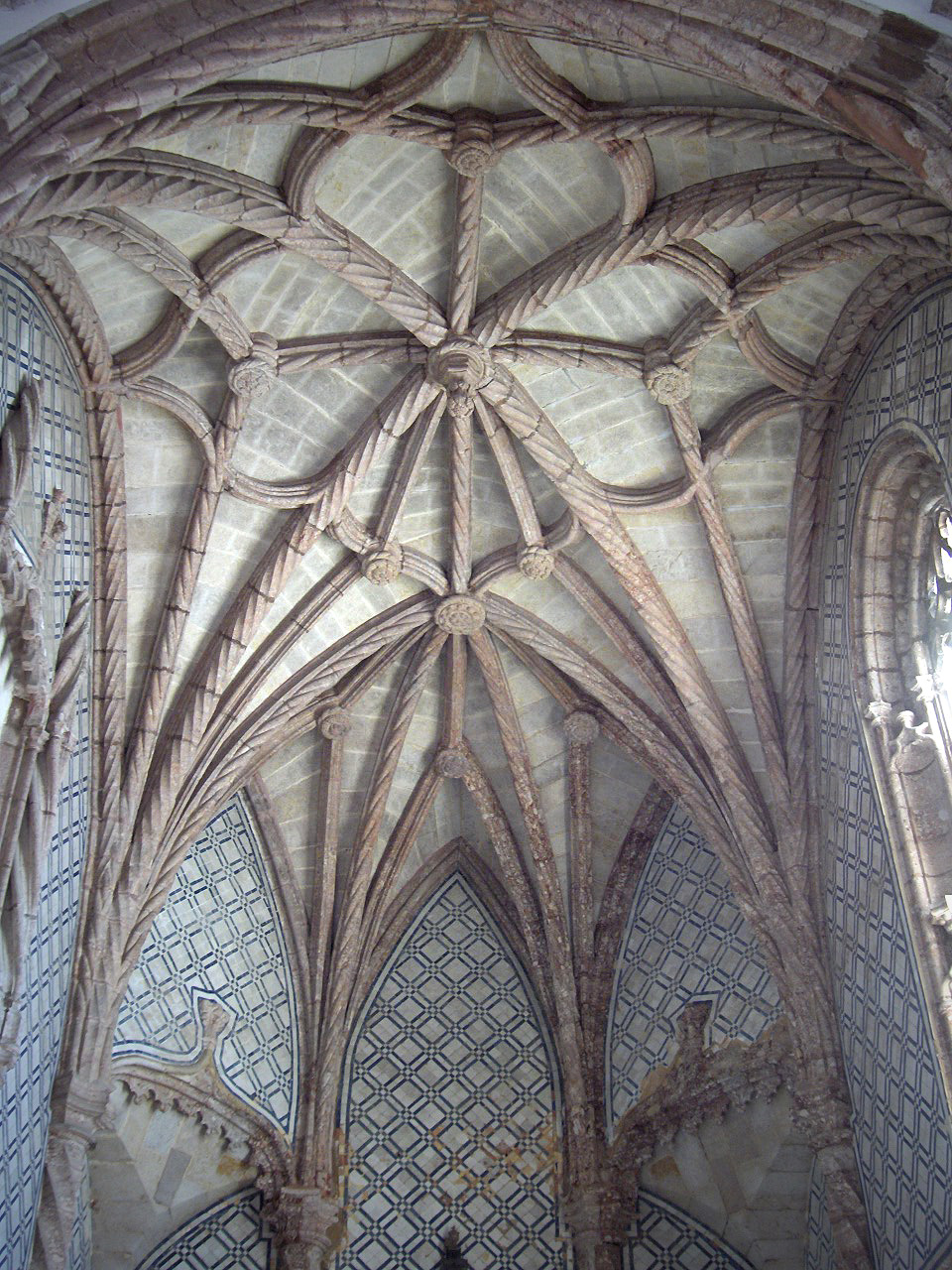
Vault of the main chapel in Manueline style, Monastery of Jesus, Setúbal

He settled in Batalha in 1516, where he died in 1528. He was buried in the Monastery of Batalha, close to the tomb of Mateus Fernandes.

== Setúbal ==
The Monastery of Jesus was founded by Justa Rodrigues Pereira outside of the city walls and sponsored by King John II, who in 1490 commissioned the building of the church of the monastery to Master Diogo de Boitaca. This is the first work where his name has been mentioned. This church is the first construction associated with the Manueline style. This specific architectural style brings the Late Gothic style to Portugal and mixes it with Early Renaissance principles, adding twisted columns and navigation symbols.

In this church he introduces the concept of a nave and two side aisles of about the same height, unifying inner space as in a hall church, a characteristic that would be found in later Manueline spaces like the nave of the Jerónimos Monastery of Lisbon. The exuberant vaulting of the main chapel shows ribs with the shape of a twisted rope - again anticipating a common theme in Manueline vaultings throughout the country.

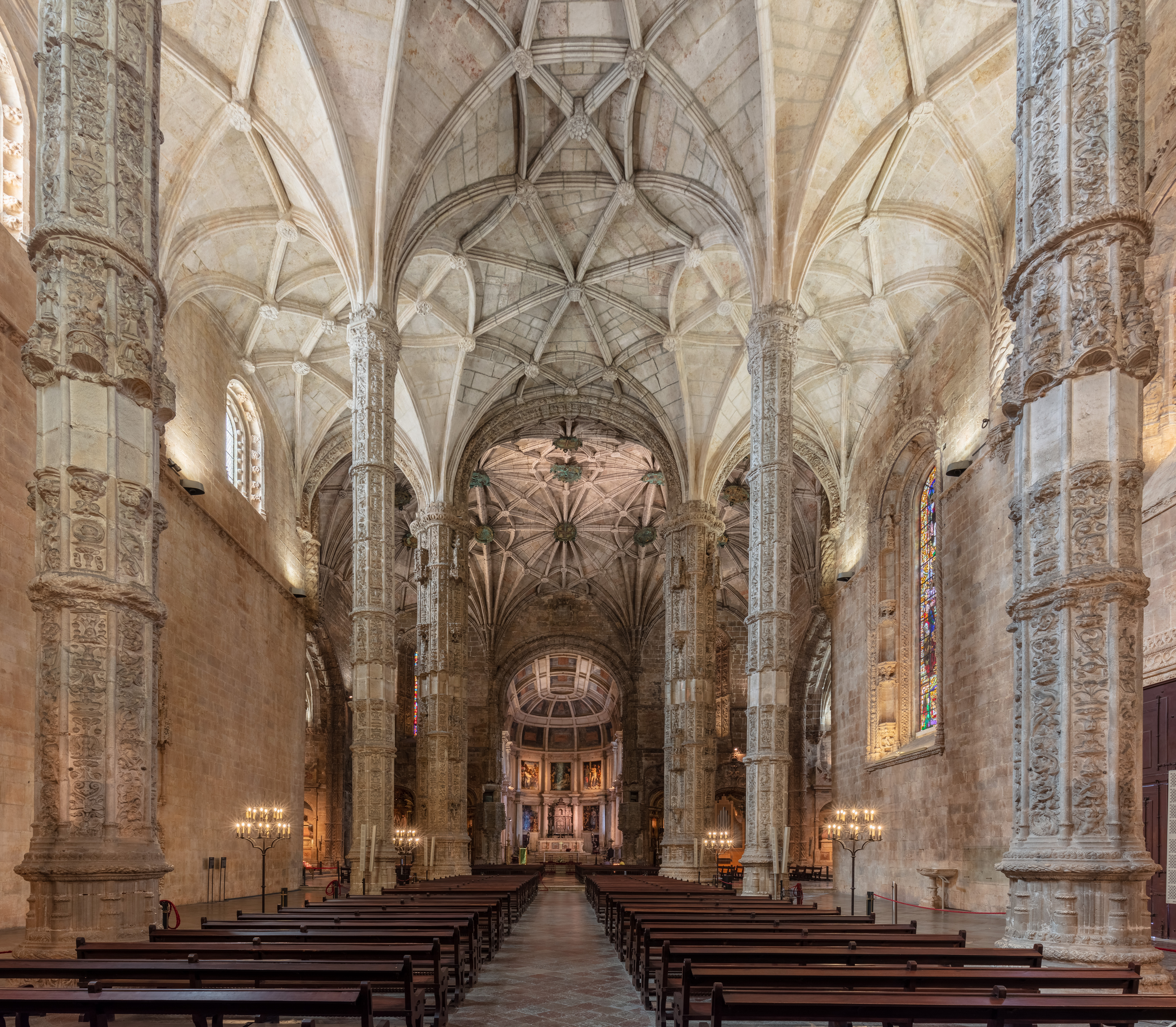
Diogo Boitaca laid the foundations for the Jerónimos Monastery as a hall church with five bays under a single vault, having built the walls of the church as far as the cornices.

== Belém ==
His next assignment was at the planning of the Hieronymites Monastery in Belém, near Lisbon. This would become his best known work, one of the most important buildings in Portugal and certainly the most successful achievement of the Manueline style. Supported by vast funds, the architect had enough financial margin to think big. He originally planned a building with four monasteries, a construction four times larger than the present-day building. Diogo Boitac worked on this project between 1502 and 1516, with the columns and the outlying walls finished when he was called on other projects. He was succeeded by his collaborator João de Castilho, who gradually moved from the Manueline style to the Plateresco style

The general plan of the monastery and church resembles that at Setúbal. He laid the foundations for this three-aisled hall church with five bays under a single vault, a clearly marked but only slightly projecting transept and a raised choir. Boitac built the walls of the church as far as the cornices and then started with the construction of the adjoining monastery. Diogo Boitac was also responsible for the first floor of the vast square cloister with its Manueline decorations. He built the groin vaults with wide arches and windows with tracery resting on delicate mullions.

== Other constructions ==
While working on the Hieronymites Monastery, Diogo Boitac, as the royal architect, was simultaneously put at work on several other projects. It is difficult to determine his specific role in all these projects.

In 1507 he was put in charge of the renovation of the Santa Cruz Monastery in Coimbra. He was responsible for the layout of the Manueline church and the chapter house. He reduced the internal space of the church to a single nave and made several other alterations. He came back in 1513 to complete this work.

In the same year 1507 he built the Hieronymite monastery of Nossa Senhora da Pena on a hilltop close to Sintra (now part of Pena National Palace). His influence can be seen especially in the concept of the vaults.

In 1509 he is reported at the Monastery of Batalha, where he may have been the Master of the Works, but that is uncertain. He erected the pillars of the Imperfect Chapels, decorated with Manueline motives carved in stone. The carved tracery decoration in Gothic style (including quatrefoils, fleurs-de-lis and rosettes) initiated by Huguet, may have been completed by Boitac in an assimilated Manueline style.

In 1511 Diogo built, together with Mateus Fernandes, the abattoirs of Coimbra, made improvements to the bridge (Ponte de St Clara) over the river Mondego and did some works to canalize this river. Sometimes other artists worked to the designs of Boitac, such as Marcos Pires, who designed the Sala Grande of the Manueline Royal Palace. The apse of the chapel of the university was rebuilt and enlarged following the plans of Boitac.

== Morocco ==
In 1510, he was knighted by the Count Vasco Menezes Coutinho for his participation in the ill-fated second siege of Arzila (the present-day Asilah, Morocco) in 1509, after it had been recaptured by the Moors in 1508.

In 1514 he left again for Morocco in his capacity as Valuer of Works. He built the fortress of Mamora (the present-day Mehedia or Mâmora, close to Rabat) that was lost to the Moors in 1515 to become a site for the dreaded Barbary corsairs.
