= Tomb of the Unknown Soldier (Portugal) =

Memorial at the Monastery of Batalha

- Portugal
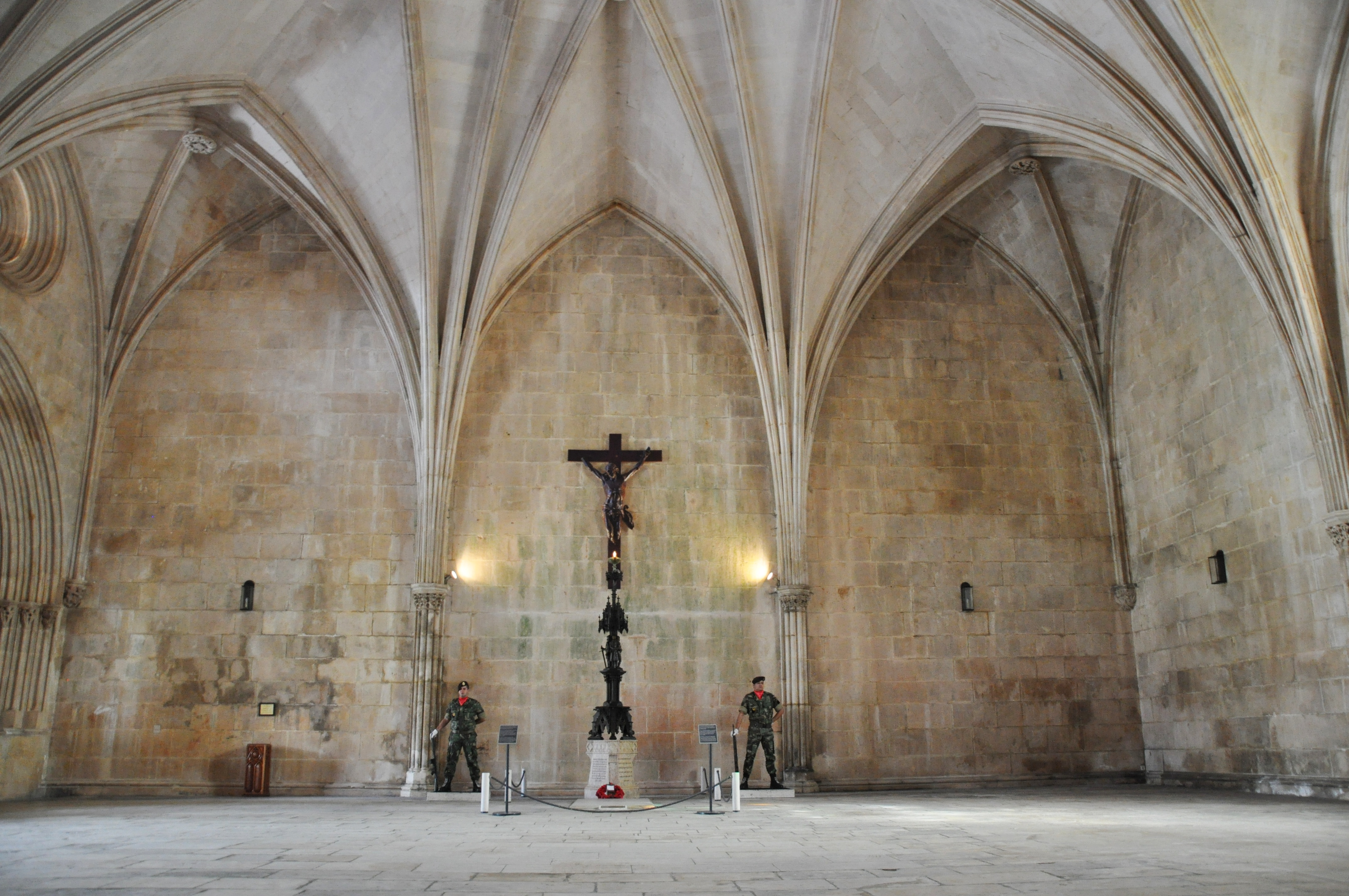
- Tomb of the Unknown Soldier at the Monastery of Batalha
- For the unknown war dead, wherever they fell
- Unveiled: 6 April 1921
- Location: 39°39′33.0″N 8°49′31.6″W near Leiria
- Total burials: 2

The Portuguese Tomb of the Unknown Soldier (Portuguese: Túmulo do Soldado Desconhecido) is located in the Sala do Capitulo at the Monastery of Batalha, near Leiria.

It holds the bodies of two soldiers of World War I – one from the battlefields of Flanders, and one from the African theatre – who were buried there on 6 April 1921.
