= Justa Rodrigues =

Justa Rodrigues, also known as Justa Rodrigues Pereira, (c. 1441–1514) was a Portuguese noblewoman and member of the royal household who became a Franciscan nun of the Order of Saint Clare later on in life and founded the Convent of Jesus in Setúbal, Portugal.

== Early life and career ==
Rodrigues was part of the Portuguese royal household as wet nurse, then governess to Prince Manuel (born 1469) before he ascended the throne as King Manuel I of Portugal. Manuel I later entrusted Rodrigues with making several trips to Castile to arrange marriages for members of the royal family. She was successful in negotiating terms for Manuel I's marriage to Isabella of Aragon around 1496, and seems to have received a financial reward for her efforts. She evidently remained closely tied to the royal family for many years, as she also served as governess for Manuel I's second son, Prince Luis (1506-1555).

Rodrigues was known to be the mistress of Frei João Manuel, Bishop of Ceuta and Guarda, with whom she had two children: João Manuel (c. 1468–1500), who became mayor of Santarém and later High Chamberlain to King Manuel I, and Nunho Manuel (c. 1469–?), Lord of Salvaterra de Magos.

There is evidence to suggest she is the subject of "Justa fue mi perdición," a poem, and later a song, popular in Portugal in the 15th and 16th centuries, that was originally written by her longtime partner João Manuel. According to an anecdote from an 18th-century Portuguese genealogist, Frei João Manuel repented of his youthful excesses later in life by saying "Justa fue mi perdiçión," which is a play on words that can be interpreted in several ways, including, "Justa (the woman) was my downfall."

== Religious life and legacy ==
Rodrigues founded the Convent of Jesus of Setúbal, receiving approval from Pope Innocent VIII on June 15, 1489, by papal bull. In 1490, she received royal approval to begin construction by building the crypt. King John II of Portugal initially sponsored the project and commissioned the architect Diogo de Boitaca to design the building.

The community became part of a reform movement within the Order of Saint Clare to restore more rigorous restrictions on the ownership of property. Sometime after 1492, Rodrigues' convent became the first in Portugal to follow the stricter Rule of St. Clare as interpreted by Saint Colette of Corbie.

Upon her death in 1514, Rodrigues was buried at the Convent of Jesus of Setúbal.
