= João Manuel (bishop of Guarda) =

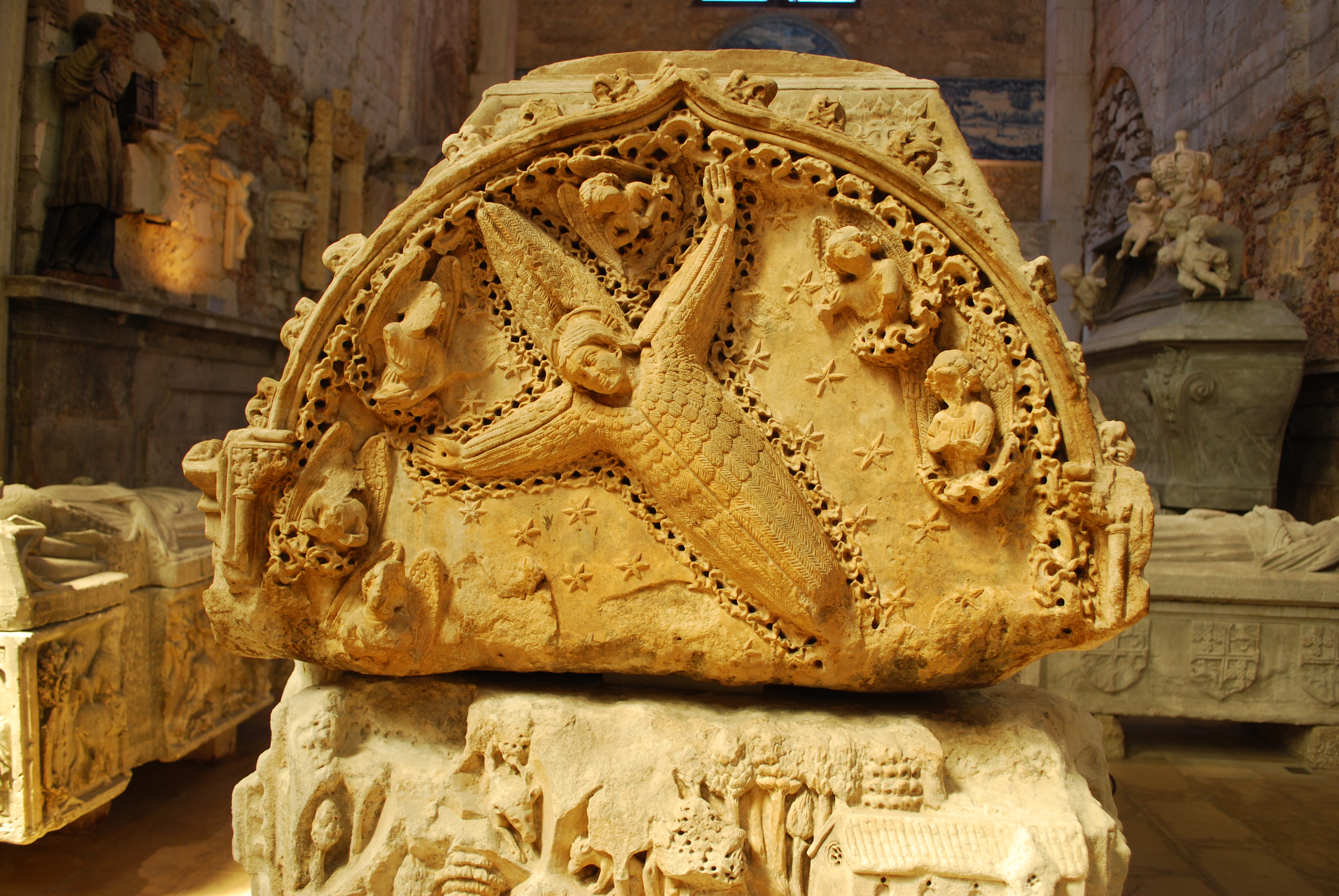
One of the gravestones at Igreja do Carmo, where João Manuel is buried.

João Manuel (Lisbon, c. 1416 – December 1476) was a religious Carmelite, Bishop of Ceuta (1443-1459) and Bishop of Guarda (1459-1476). Although some genealogists claimed that he was the son of Edward, King of Portugal and Joana Manuel de Vilhena, great-granddaughter of Juan Manuel, Prince of Villena, Anselmo Braamcamp Freire dismisses such filiation and provides sufficient arguments against it.

João Manuel joined the Carmelites in 1441 to become provincial of the Order in Portugal. He was made titular Bishop of Tiberias at the same time by Pope Eugene IV. He was also the ambassador to Hungary. In 1443, he was appointed Bishop of Ceuta and primate of Africa. In 1450, he became chaplain to King Afonso V of Portugal. Finally, in 1459, he was appointed Bishop of Guarda, a town in which he never actually lived.

From a relationship he had with a Justa Rodrigues, he had two sons, who served Alfonso V and John II of Portugal during their reigns: João Manuel (1466-1500), mayor of Santarém, and Nuno Manuel (1469- after 1500), Lord of Salvaterra de Magos.

He is buried at the Carmo Church (Portuguese: Igreja do Carmo) located at the Carmo Convent (Portuguese: Convento da Ordem do Carmo), a medieval convent later ruined in the 1755 Lisbon earthquake.

== Bibliography ==
- Braamcamp Freire, Anselmo (2006) [1921]. Brasões da Sala de Sintra (in Portuguese). Lisboa: Imprensa nacional-Casa da Moeda. ISBN 9789722708210. OCLC 493142845.

Preceded by Aimar d'Aurillac	Bishop of Ceuta; 1443-1459	Succeeded by Álvaro de Évora
Preceded by Louis of Guarda	Bishop of Guarda; 1459-1476	Succeeded by João Afonso Ferraz
