= Batalha Monastery =

- Mosteiro da Batalha (Portuguese)
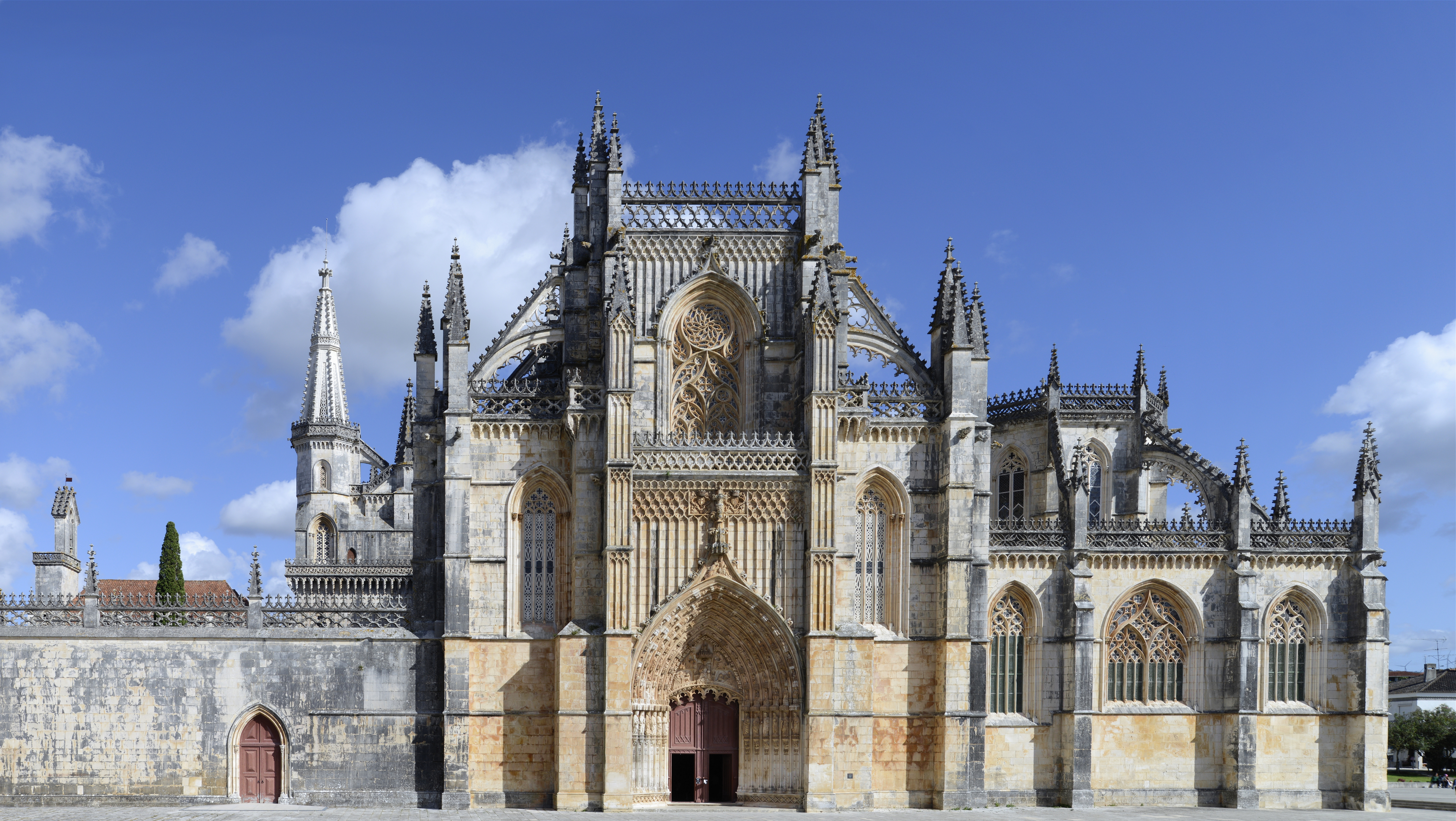
- Batalha Monastery is one of the most important Gothic sites in Portugal.
- Interactive map of Batalha Monastery
- 39°39′33″N 8°49′34″W
- Location: Batalha, Portugal

UNESCO World Heritage Site
- Official name: Monastery of Batalha
- Type: Cultural
- Criteria: i, ii
- Designated: 1983 (7th session)
- Reference no.: 264
- Region: Europe

Portuguese National Monument
- Type: Non-movable
- Criteria: National Monument
- Designated: 10 January 1907
- Reference no.: IPA.00004061

The Monastery of Batalha (Portuguese: Mosteiro da Batalha) is a Dominican convent in the municipality of Batalha, historical Beira Litoral province, in the Centro of Portugal. Originally, and officially, known as the Monastery of Saint Mary of the Victory (Portuguese: Mosteiro de Santa Maria da Vitória), it was erected in commemoration of the 1385 Battle of Aljubarrota and would serve as the burial church of the 15th-century Aviz dynasty of Portuguese royalty. It is one of the best and original examples of Late Flamboyant Gothic architecture in Portugal, intermingled with the Manueline style. The monastery is a historic and cultural monument and was listed as a UNESCO World Heritage site in 1983.

== History ==
Monastery of Santa Maria da Vitória

The monastery was built to thank the Virgin Mary for the Portuguese victory over the Castilians in the Battle of Aljubarrota in 1385, fulfilling a promise of King John I of Portugal. The battle put an end to the 1383–1385 Crisis.

It took over a century to build, starting in 1386 and ending circa 1517, spanning the reign of seven kings. It took the efforts of fifteen architects (Mestre das Obras da Batalha), although for seven of them the title was merely honorary. The construction required an enormous effort, using extraordinary resources of men and material. New techniques and artistic styles, hitherto unknown in Portugal, were deployed.

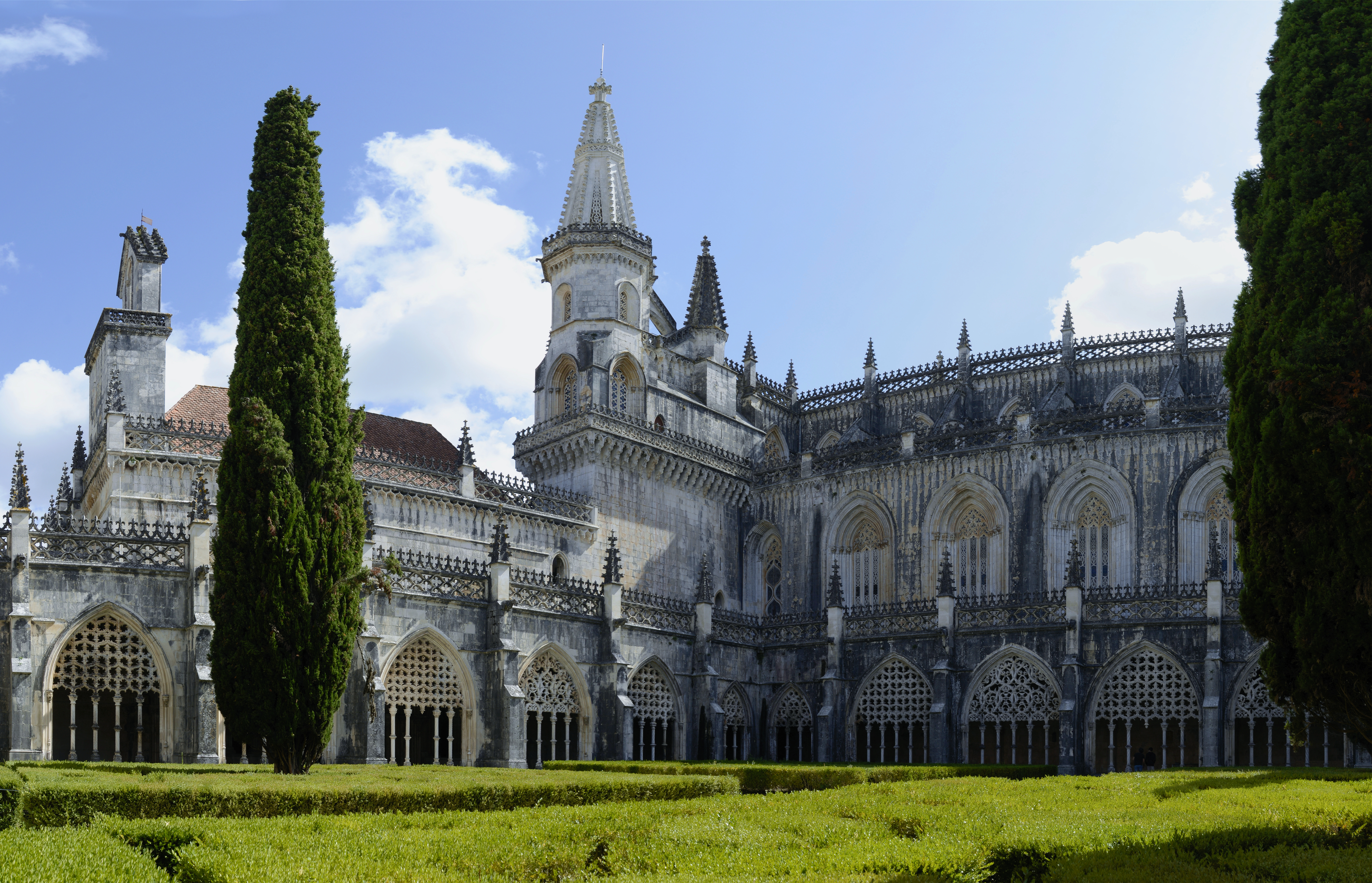
View of the cloister of D. João I

Work began in 1386 by the Portuguese architect Afonso Domingues, who continued until 1402. He drew up the plan, and many of the structures in the church and the cloister are his doing. His style was essentially Rayonnant Gothic; however, there are influences from the English Perpendicular Period. There are similarities with the façade of York Minster and with the nave and transept of Canterbury Cathedral.

He was succeeded by Huguet from 1402 to 1438. This architect, who was probably of Catalan descent, introduced the Flamboyant Gothic style. This is manifest in the main façade, the dome of the square chapter house, the Founder's Chapel, the basic structure of the Imperfect Chapels and the north and east naves of the main cloister. He raised the height of the nave to 32.46 m. By altering the proportions he made the interior of the church seem even narrower. He also completed the transept, but he died before he could finish the Imperfect Chapels.

Lateral view of the monastery and statue of Nuno Álvares Pereira

During the reign of Afonso V of Portugal, the Portuguese architect Fernão de Évora continued the construction between 1448 and 1477. He added the Cloister of Afonso V. He was succeeded by the architect Mateus Fernandes the Elder in the period 1480–1515. This master of the Manueline style worked on the portal of the Capelas Imperfeitas. Together with the famous Diogo Boitac he realized the tracery of the arcades in the Claustro Real. Work on the convent continued into the reign of John III of Portugal with the addition of the fine Renaissance tribune (1532) by João de Castilho. The construction came to a halt when the king decided to put all his efforts in the construction of the Jerónimos Monastery in Lisbon.

The earthquake of 1755 did some damage, but much greater damage was inflicted by the Napoleonic troops of Marshal Masséna, who sacked and burned the complex in 1810 and 1811. When the Dominicans were expelled from the complex in 1834, the church and convent were abandoned and left to fall into ruin.

In 1840, king Ferdinand II of Portugal started a restoration program of the abandoned and ruined convent, saving this jewel of Gothic architecture. The restoration would last till the early years of the 20th century. One of the last architects was master stonemason Jose Patrocinio de Sousa, responsible for rebuilding the monastery. It was declared a National Monument in 1907. In 1980 the monastery was turned into a museum.

The Batalha convent was added in 1983 by UNESCO to its list of World Heritage sites.

== Architecture ==
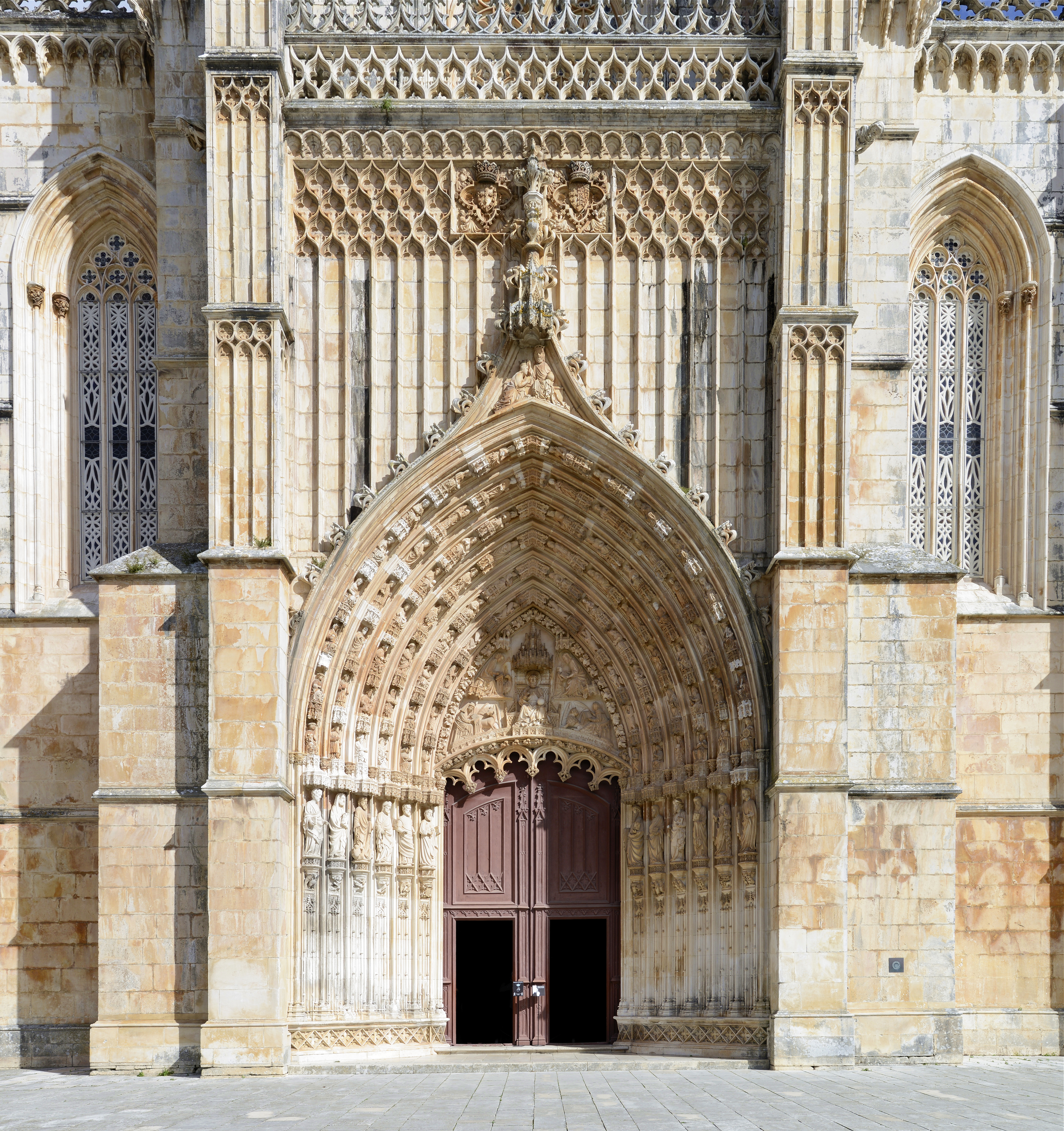
Main portal

The convent stands apart from the town.

The western façade, facing the large square with its equestrian statue of general Nuno Álvares Pereira, is divided in three by buttresses and huge pilasters: the Founder's Chapel (Capela do Fundador), the side wall of an aisle and the projecting portal. On the right side of this façade are the Unfinished Chapels (Capelas Imperfeitas), a separate octagonal structure added to the complex.

Off the east side, next to the church choir is the Chapterhouse (Sala do Capítulo). The Cloister of King João I borders on the church and this chapterhouse. The structure continues into the cloister of King Afonso V (Claustro de D. Afonso V). On the northern side of the complex lies the Tomb of the Unknown Soldier from the First World War.

The portal shows in the archivolt a profusion of 78 statues, divided over six rows, of Old Testament kings, angels, prophets and saints, each under a baldachin. The splays on both sides display (inferior copies of) statues of the apostles, with one standing on a chained devil. The tympanum shows Christ enthroned, sitting under a baldachin and flanked by the four Evangelists, each with his own attribute.

=== Interior ===
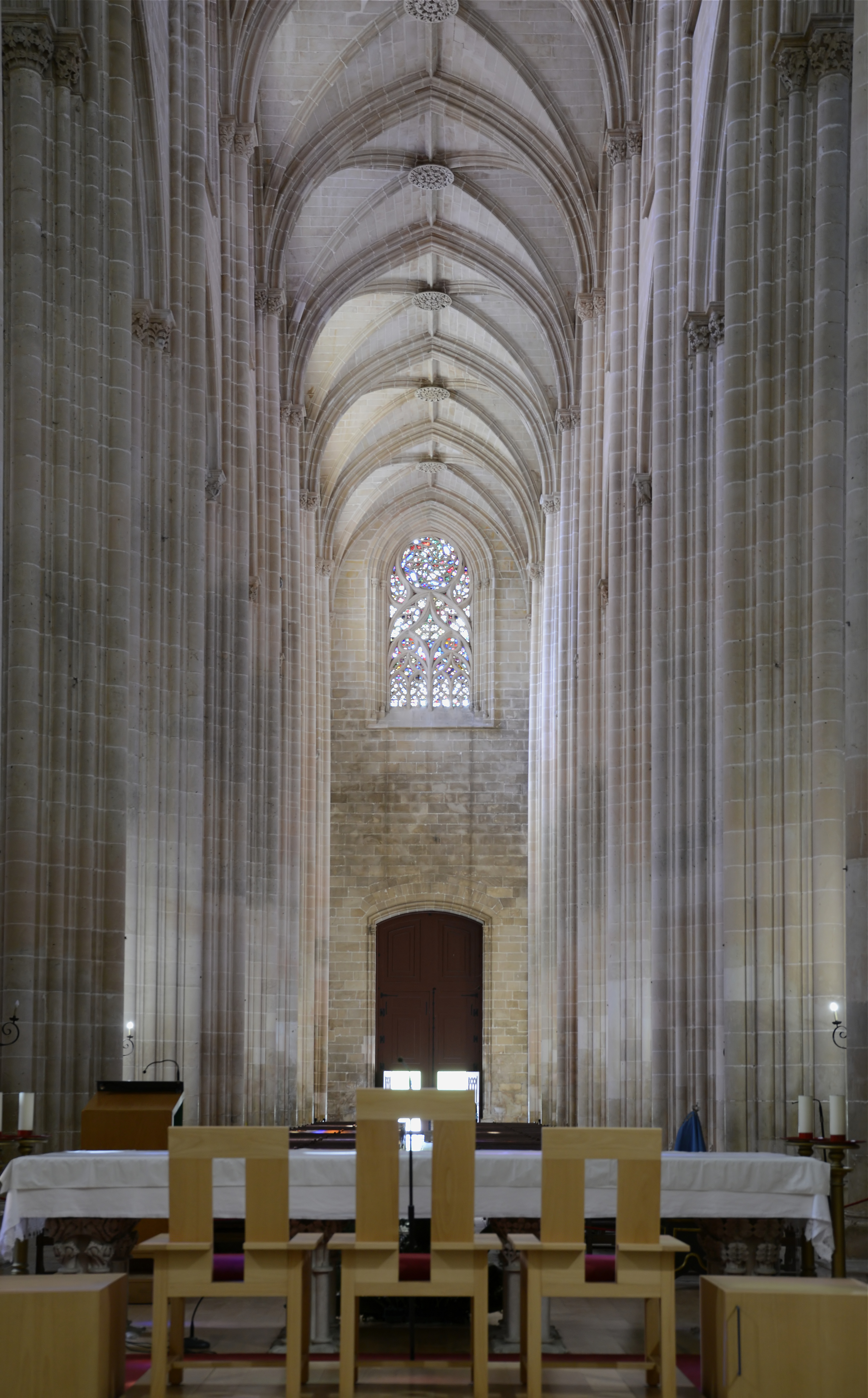
Main nave

==== Nave and choir ====
The church is vast and narrow (22 m) in proportion to its height (32.4 m). The nave was raised to its present height by the second architect, Huguet, altering the proportions of the church and giving it its present aspect. Its interior gives a sober and bare impression by its lack of ornaments and statues in the nave. The ribbed vaults, supported by compound piers, are closed by ornamented keystones. Light enters the church through ten stained-glass windows of the clerestory and the tall, traceried windows in the side walls and the transept and through the two rows of lanciform windows in the choir. The choir extends into two-bay transepts and consists of five apsidal chapels, with the central one projecting.

Batalha probably had the first workshop for stained-glass windows in Portugal. The art was introduced to Portugal by German artists from the regions of Franconia and Nuremberg. The oldest windows date back to the end of the 1430s. But the Manueline, ogival stained-glass windows in the choir date from the 1520s and 1530s and were produced by Portuguese masters, among them Francisco Henriques. They represent scenes from the lives of Jesus and Mary: the Visitation, the Epiphany, the Flight into Egypt and the Resurrection of Christ.

The architect Mateus Fernandes and his wife are buried under a marble tomb-slab close to the portal. The tomb of the knight Martim Gonçalves de Maçada, who saved the king's life during the battle at Aljubarrota, can be found close to the Capela do Fundador.

==== Founder's Chapel ====
Tomb of John I and Philippa

The square Founder's Chapel (Portuguese: Capela do Fundador) was built between 1426 and 1434 by the architect Huguet on orders of King John I to become the first royal pantheon in Portugal. It gives a perfect synthesis between Flamboyant Gothic and the English Perpendicular style, as Philippa of Lancaster had brought along a few English architects. The chapel consists of three notional bays and a central octagon buttressed by eight piers, adorned with crockets, supporting deeply stilted arches.

The joint tomb of King John I of Portugal (d. 1433) and his wife Philippa of Lancaster (d. 1415) stands under the star vault of the octagon. Their statues lie in full regalia, with clasped hands (expressing the good relations between Portugal and England) and heads resting on a pillow, under elaborately ornamented baldachins. The coats of arms of the houses of Aviz and Lancaster are on top of these baldachins, together with the insignia of the Order of the Garter. On the cover plate of the tomb are inscribed in repetition the mottos of the king Por bem ("for the better") and of the queen Yl me plet ("I am pleased").

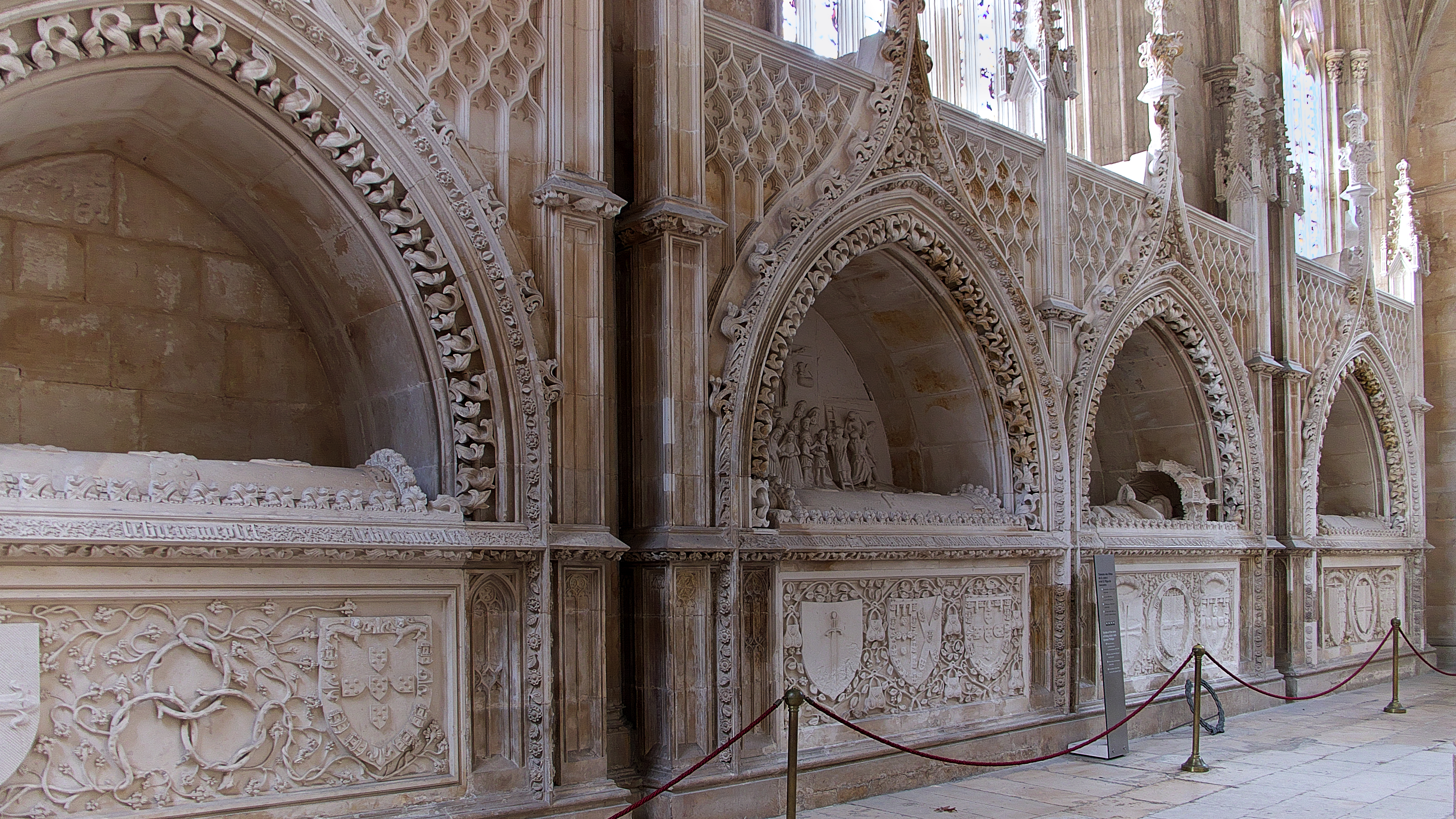
Tombs of the four princes (from left to right): Ferdinand, John, Henry, Peter

This octagon is surrounded by an ambulatory with complex vaulting. At the south wall stand a row of recessed arches with the tombs of the four younger sons of John I, together with their spouses. From left to right: Ferdinand the Holy Prince (a bachelor, he died a prisoner in Fez in 1443; his bodily remains were later recovered and moved here in 1473); John of Reguengos, the Constable of Portugal (d. 1442), with his wife Isabella of Barcelos (d. 1466); Henry the Navigator (under a baldachin, d. 1460, a bachelor); and Peter of Coimbra (regent for Afonso V, 1438–1448, who was killed at the Battle of Alfarrobeira in 1449; his remains were moved here in 1456) with his wife Isabella of Urgell (d. 1459).

The three tombs on the west wall are copies of the original tombs of King Afonso V (r. 1438–1481), John II (r. 1481–1495) (empty because Masséna's soldiers threw away the bones) and his son and heir, Prince Afonso (who died in an accident at the age of seventeen, predeceasing his father).

==== Unfinished Chapels ====
As Capelas Imperfeitas ("The Unfinished Chapels") are a reminder that the monastery was never actually finished. They form a separate octagonal structure tacked on the choir of the church (via a retrochoir) and only accessible from the outside. It was commissioned in 1437 by King Edward of Portugal ("Dom Duarte", d. 1438) as a second royal mausoleum for himself and his descendants. But he and his queen Eleanor of Aragon are the only ones buried here (Eleanor died in exile in Toledo in 1445; her remains were moved here in 1456).

Interior of the Unfinished Chapels

The original design, begun by Huguet, was altered by successive architects, especially Mateus Fernandes (who is buried inside the church). The octagonal rotunda has seven radiating hexagonal chapels. In the corners of the chapels stand the massive unfinished buttresses that were intended to support the vault. These pillars, designed by Diogo Boitac, are decorated with Manueline motives carved in stone.

The portal rises to a monumental fifteen metres. It was originally built in Gothic style, but was transformed beyond recognition by Mateus Fernandes into a masterpiece of Manueline style (completed in 1509). It is completely decorated into a lacework of sumptuous and stylized Manueline motives: armillary spheres, winged angels, ropes, circles, tree stumps, clover-shaped arches and florid projections. This homage of King Manuel I to his predecessor King Edward mentions his motto Leauté faray tam yaserei ("I will always be loyal"). This motto is then repeated more than two hundred times in the arches, vaults and pillars of the chapels.

The Renaissance loggia, added at about 1533, was probably meant for musicians. It is ascribed to the architect João de Castilho.

==== Chapterhouse ====
The Chapterhouse (Portuguese: Sala do Capitulo) reminds visitors of the military reason for the monastery's foundation: a military honor guard of two sentinels stands watch over the tombs of two unknown soldiers killed in World War I.

This square room is especially notable for its star vault lacking a central support and spanning a square space of 19 meters on the side. This was such a daring idea at the time that condemned prisoners were used to perform the task. It was completed after two failed attempts. When the last scaffolds were removed, it is said that Huguet spent the night under the vault to silence his critics.

The stained-glass Renaissance window in the east wall dates from 1508. It depicts scenes of the Passion and is attributed to the Portuguese painters Master João and Francisco Henriques.

==== Royal Cloister ====
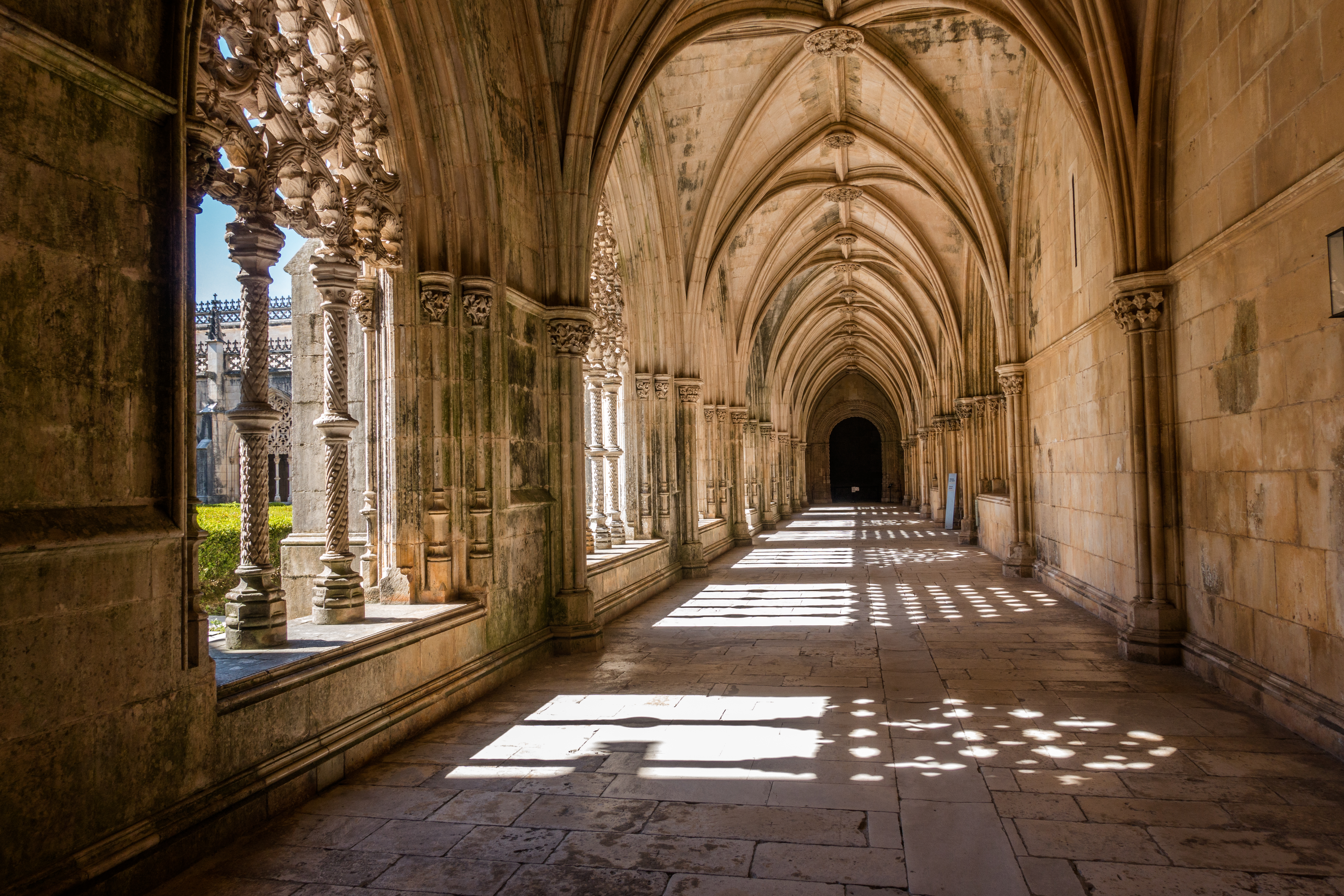
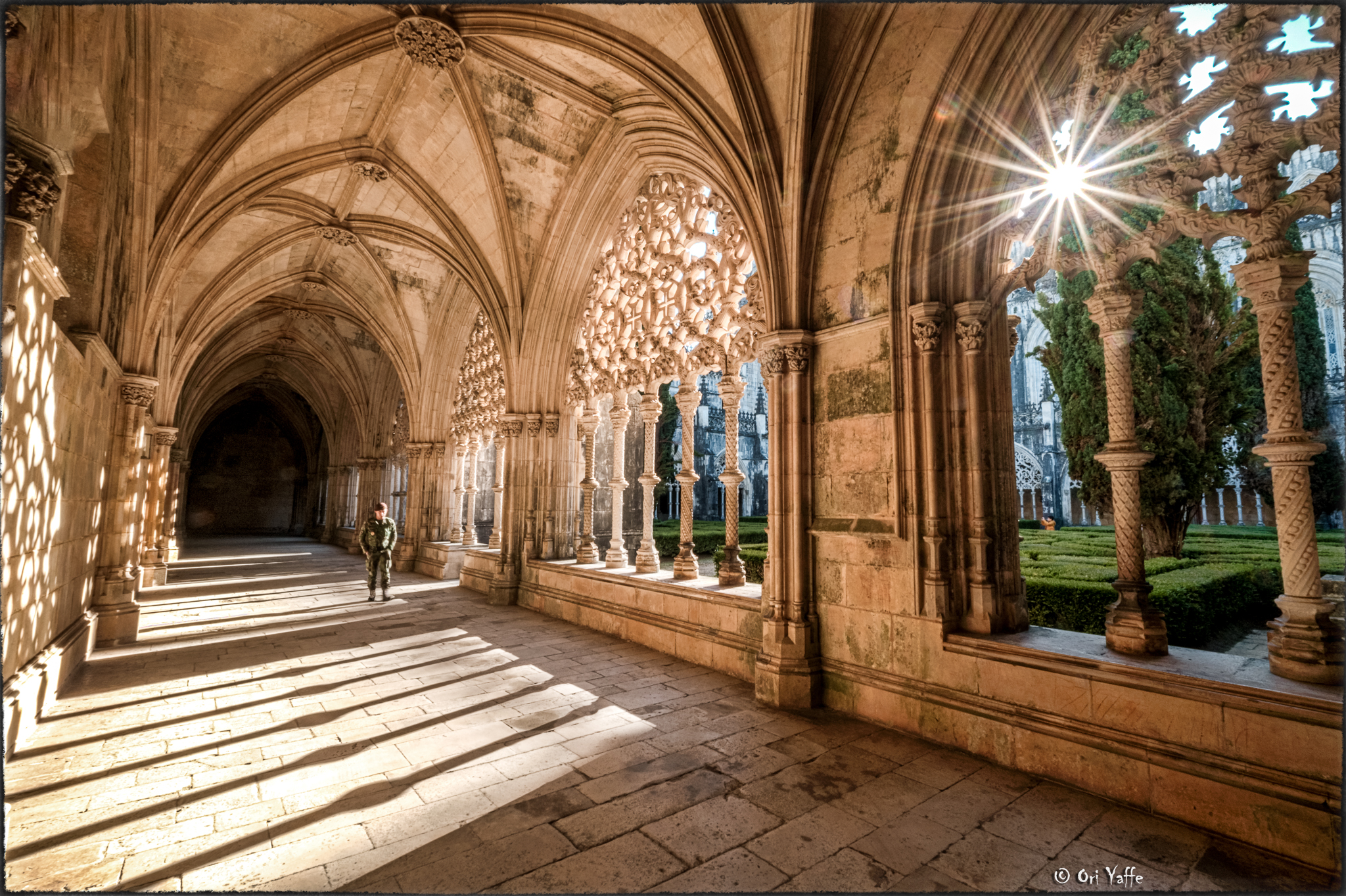
King John I Cloister of Batalha Monastery

The Royal Cloister (Portuguese: Claustro Real) was not part of the original project. It was built under the architect Fernão de Évora between 1448 and 1477. Its sober outward appearance is in stark contrast with the Flamboyant Gothic style of the church. The carved tracery decoration in Gothic style (including quatrefoils, fleurs-de-lis and rosettes) by Huguet in the ambulatory forms a successful combination with the Manueline style in the arcade screens, added later by Mateus Fernandes. Two different patterns alternate, one with the cross of the Order of Christ, the other with armillaries.

The colonettes, supporting these intricate arcade screens, are decorated with spiral motives, armillaries, lotus blossoms, briar branches, pearls and shells and exotic vegetation.

==== Lavabo ====
Situated in the northwestern corner of the Claustro Real, this work of Mateus Fernandes consists of a fountain and two smaller basins above, illuminated by light seeping through the intricate tracery of the arches around it.

==== Cloister of King Afonso ====
This sober cloister next to the Claustro Real was built in conventional Gothic style with double pointed arches. It was constructed in the second half of the 15th century by the architect Fernão de Évora. It stands in contrast with the Manueline flamboyance of the somewhat larger Claustro Real. The keystones in the vault carry the coat-of-arms of D. Duarte I and Afonso V.

== Gallery ==
Main façade

Main portal and window above

Equestrian statue of Nuno Álvares Pereira

Nave of the church

Tomb of João I and Philippa of Lancaster

Vault of the Founder’s Chapel

Portal of the Unfinished Chapels

Cloister of João I

Cloister lavabo

Gargoyle

== See also ==
- Late medieval domes
