= Mateus Fernandes (architect) =

Portuguese architect

Mateus Fernandes (died 10 April 1515) was a Portuguese architect born in Covilhã. He was noted for his works in the Manueline style at the Monastery of Batalha, Portugal.

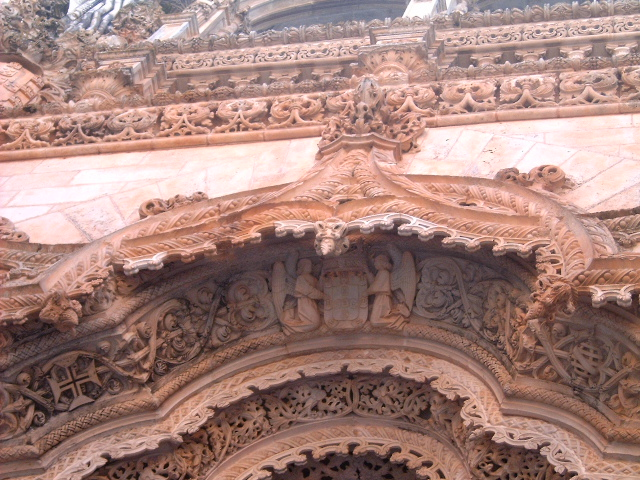
Portal of the Unfinished Chapels in the Monastery of Batalha (close up)

He became master of works at the monastery of Batalha in 1490 or slightly earlier, during the reign of king John II of Portugal. Before this date, nothing is known of his private life, as he has left no records to consult other than his architectural marvels. He succeeded the architect Fernão de Évora as architect of the monastery. Mateus Fernandes later became the primary architect of the next king, Manuel I of Portugal, who made him the supervisor of other architectural works in the rest of the country.

However, Mateus Fernandes is best known for his work in "Manueline style" at the entrance portal of the roofless, Unfinished Chapels (Capelas Imperfeitas) of the Monastery of Batalha. The exceptionally large portal rises to a monumental fifteen m by 7½ m wide (50 x 25 ft), overshadowing the rest of the chapels at the monastery. It was originally built in Late Gothic style, but was transformed beyond recognition by Fernandes into one of the first masterpieces of Manueline style (completed in 1509). The Manueline style would then spread from Batalha throughout all Portugal.

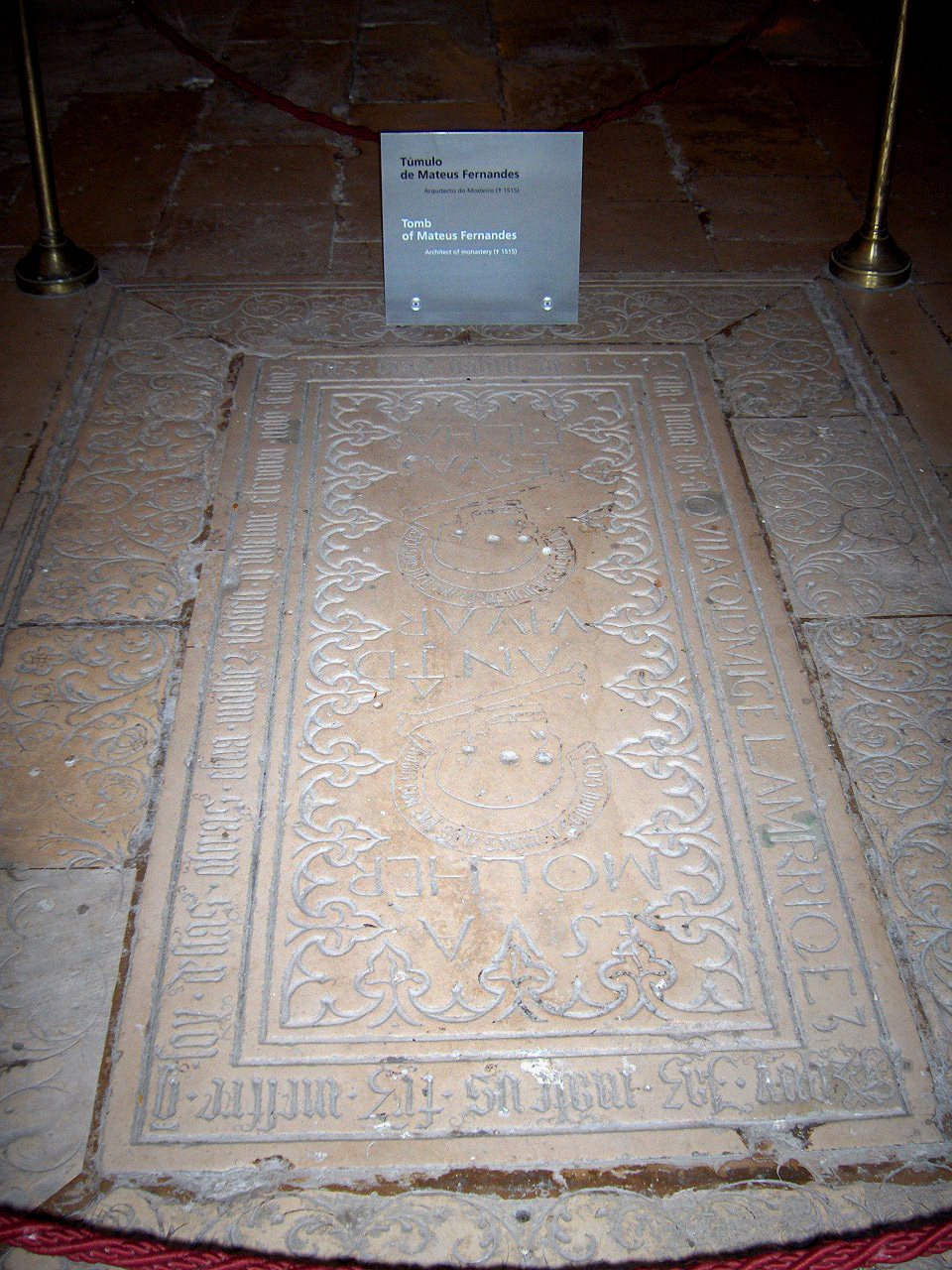
Tomb of Mateus Fernandes

The portal is completely decorated into a lacework of sumptuous Manueline motifs, with flamboyant iconography including the armillary symbol of the cosmos, the cross of the Order of Christ (that decorated the sails of the Portuguese ships of the discoverers), spheres, winged angels, ropes, circles, tree stumps, trefoil arches and florid projections. Fernandes was again original by making the sculptural aspect dominate over the architectural aspect, united in an asymmetrical composition. Mateus Fernandes has tried to represent in stone, the exuberant and expansive spirit in the reign of king Manuel.

In the homage of King Manuel I to his predecessor, king D. Duarte mentions his motto Leauté faray tam yaserei (I will always be loyal). This motto was then repeated more than two hundred times, carved into the stone arches, vaults and pillars of the chapels. The original plans for an octagonal dome, supported by buttresses, to crown this pantheon to the House of Aviz was never to be finished since funds ran out, and the construction of the Jerónimos Monastery at Belém would gain absolute priority.

Together with the architect Diogo Boitac, he rendered the Manueline style in the tracery of the arcade screens in the ambulatory of the Royal Cloister (Claustro Real) in the Jerónimos Monastery. Fernandes also worked with Boitac to build the abattoirs of Coimbra in 1511. Boitac was another important Manueline architect and sculptor, who even became the son-in-law of Fernandes by marrying his daughter Isabel Henriques in 1512.

He (or his son, since they carried the same name) is reported to have directed the construction of the church and the hospital of Misericórdia at Óbidos, while they were engaged at the same time in Caldas da Rainha.

Mateus Fernandes died in Batalha on 10 April 1515 and was buried, with his wife, under a marble tomb-slab close to the portal of the monastery. Diogo Boitac was buried in a tomb close by in 1528. Fernandes was succeeded as master of works at the monastery in 1516 by his son Mateus Fernandes the Younger (died 1528), who had already been deputized to supervise construction at the monastery in his father's absence.

Because of East Indian influences in his work and a vague similarity to the design of the Indian Jain temple of Ahmedabad, scholars have often tried to link Mateus Fernandes to Tomás Fernandes, a military architect in India, or to Diogo Fernandes of Beja, who was a member of the embassy in Gujarat in 1513. But all this has remained conjecture. The north porch of St Mary Redcliffe at Bristol has a resemblance to his style, which is a possibility because of the frequent contacts between Portugal and England.
