= Monastery of Jesus of Setúbal =

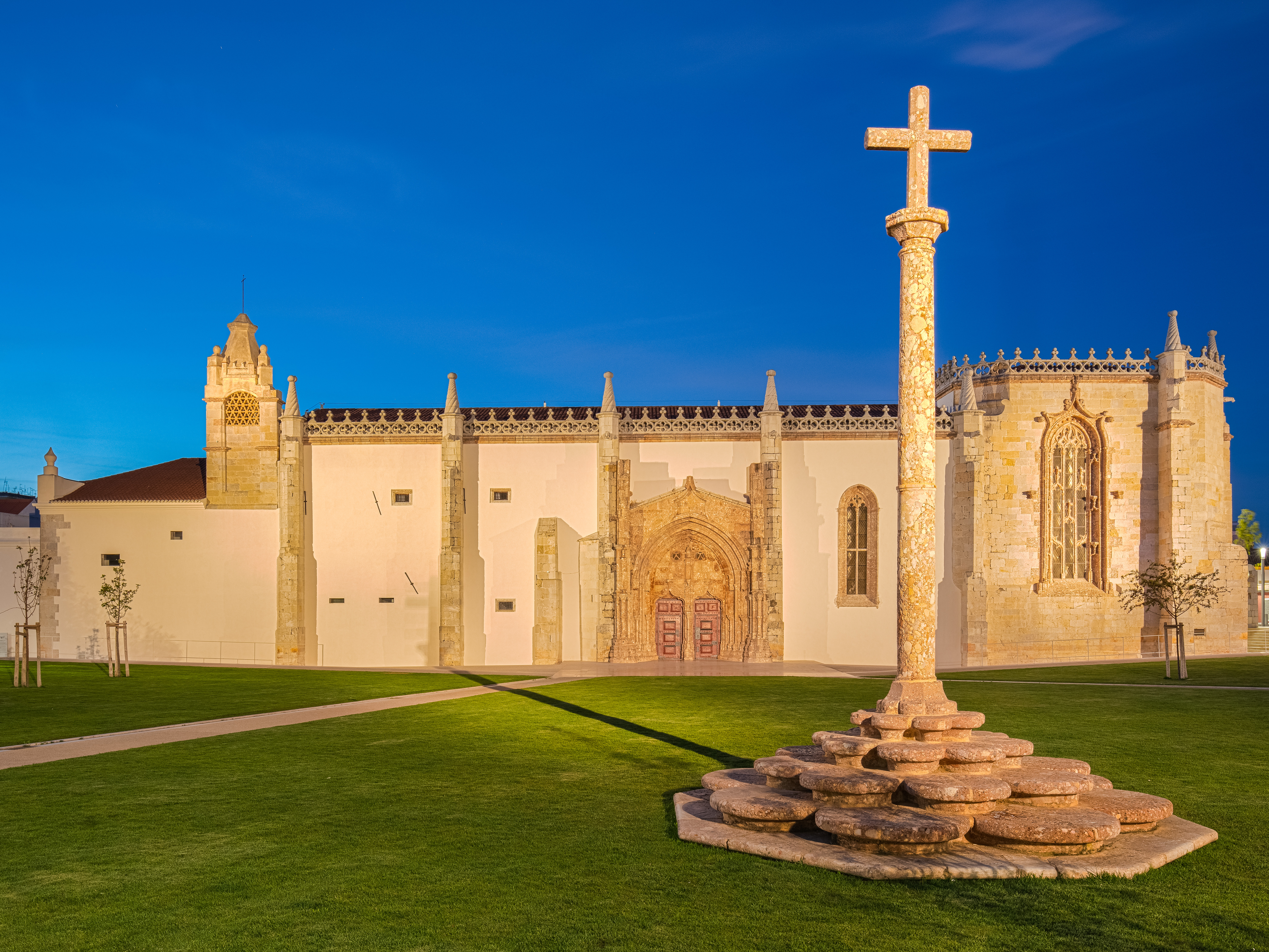
- Monastery of Jesus
- Monastery of Jesus of Setúbal
- 38°31′34″N 8°53′41″W
- Location: Setúbal, Lisbon
- Country: Portugal
- Denomination: Roman Catholic
- Tradition: Order of Friars Minor

History
- Founder: Diogo de Boitaca

Architecture
- Architectural type: Manueline Gothic
- Years built: 1491-1495

Portuguese National Monument
- Designated: Classification of Heritage in Portugal
- Reference no.: SIPA: 3439, DGPC: 70218

The Monastery of Jesus (Portuguese: Mosteiro de Jesus) is a historical religious building in Setúbal, Portugal, which served a monastery of Poor Clare nuns. It is one of the first buildings in the Manueline style, the Portuguese version of late Gothic. The cloisters of the complex houses a museum of the monastery (Museu de Jesus). In 2013, pan-European heritage organization Europa Nostra declared the monastery to be one of the 7 most endangered monuments in Europe.

== History ==
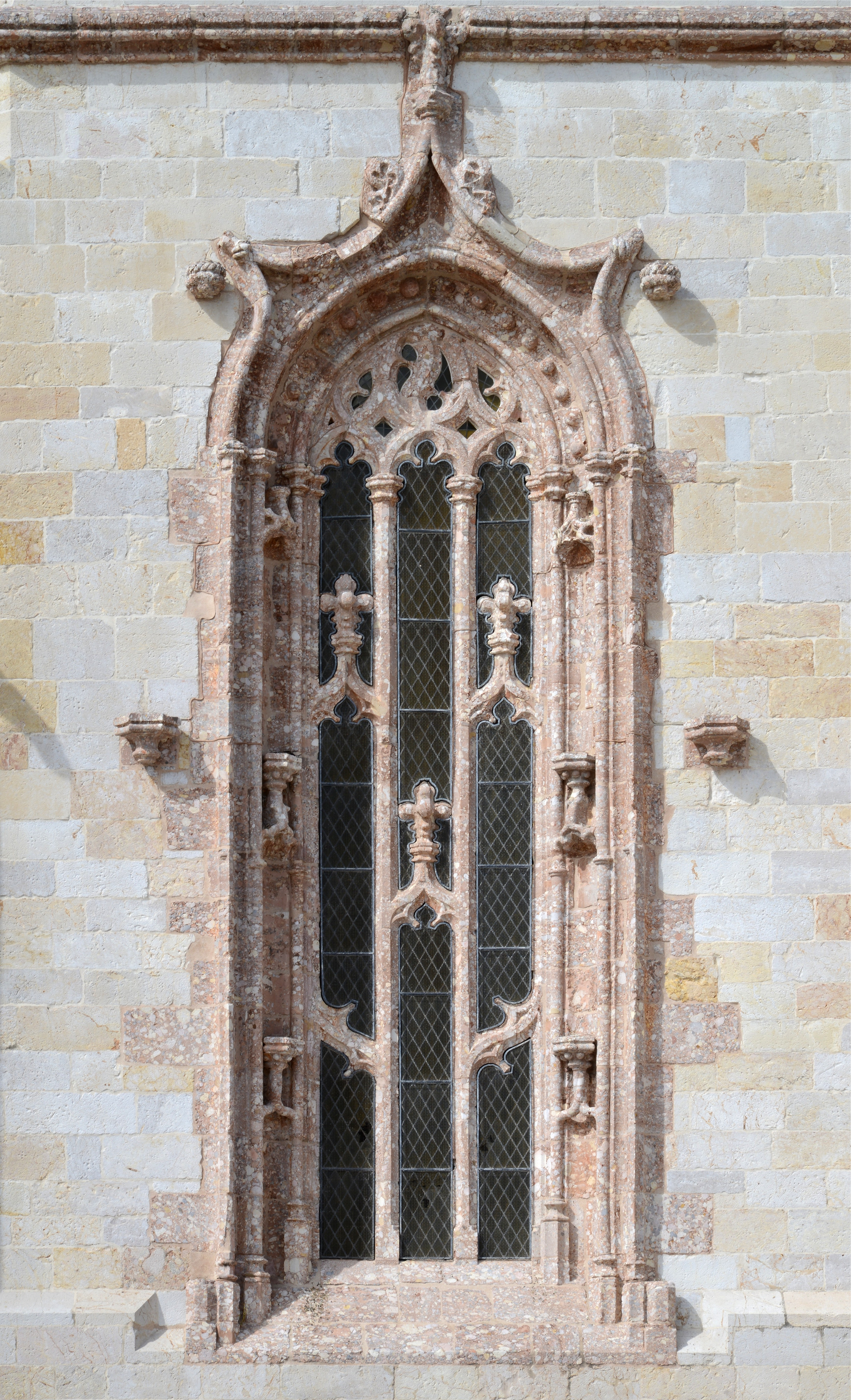
Main window of the apse of the church of the Monastery of Jesus

The monastery was founded around 1490, outside the city walls of Setúbal, by Justa Rodrigues Pereira, a noblewoman of the Portuguese royal court. After 1491, King John II started sponsoring the building of the monastery, which he commissioned Diogo de Boitaca (or Boytac), an architect of unknown origin, possibly French. After the death of John II in 1495, King Manuel I continued supporting the construction works through an annual payment to Boitaca for his work on the church.

Most of the church was built between 1490 and 1495, and in 1496 the nuns of Order of Poor Clares were already living in the monastery. After 1495, under Manuel I, the nave of the church was covered with stone vaulting, replacing the wooden ceiling originally planned. It is believed that, in the 1510s, King Manuel I ordered the apse of the church to be rebuilt, although this is contested by some authorities. Founder Justa Rodrigues Pereira and her family were buried in the crypt of the church, located in the main chapel.

During the first half of the 16th century, Jorge de Lencastre, bastard son of King John II and Master of the Order of Santiago, donated to the monastery a large area in front of the South façade, known as Terreiro de Jesus (Jesus' Square). He commissioned an elegant cross in honour of the patron of the monastery, Jesus Christ, which was placed near the apse of the church. In the 19th century the cross was moved to the middle of the square.

The church and monastery were severely damaged by the Great earthquake of 1755. The earthquakes of 1531, 1858, 1909 and 1969 inflicted minor damage.

In 1992, IGESPAR, under the Cultural Ministry of Portugal, declared the monastery to be a national monument holding intangible value to Portuguese heritage.

== Art and architecture ==
=== Exterior ===
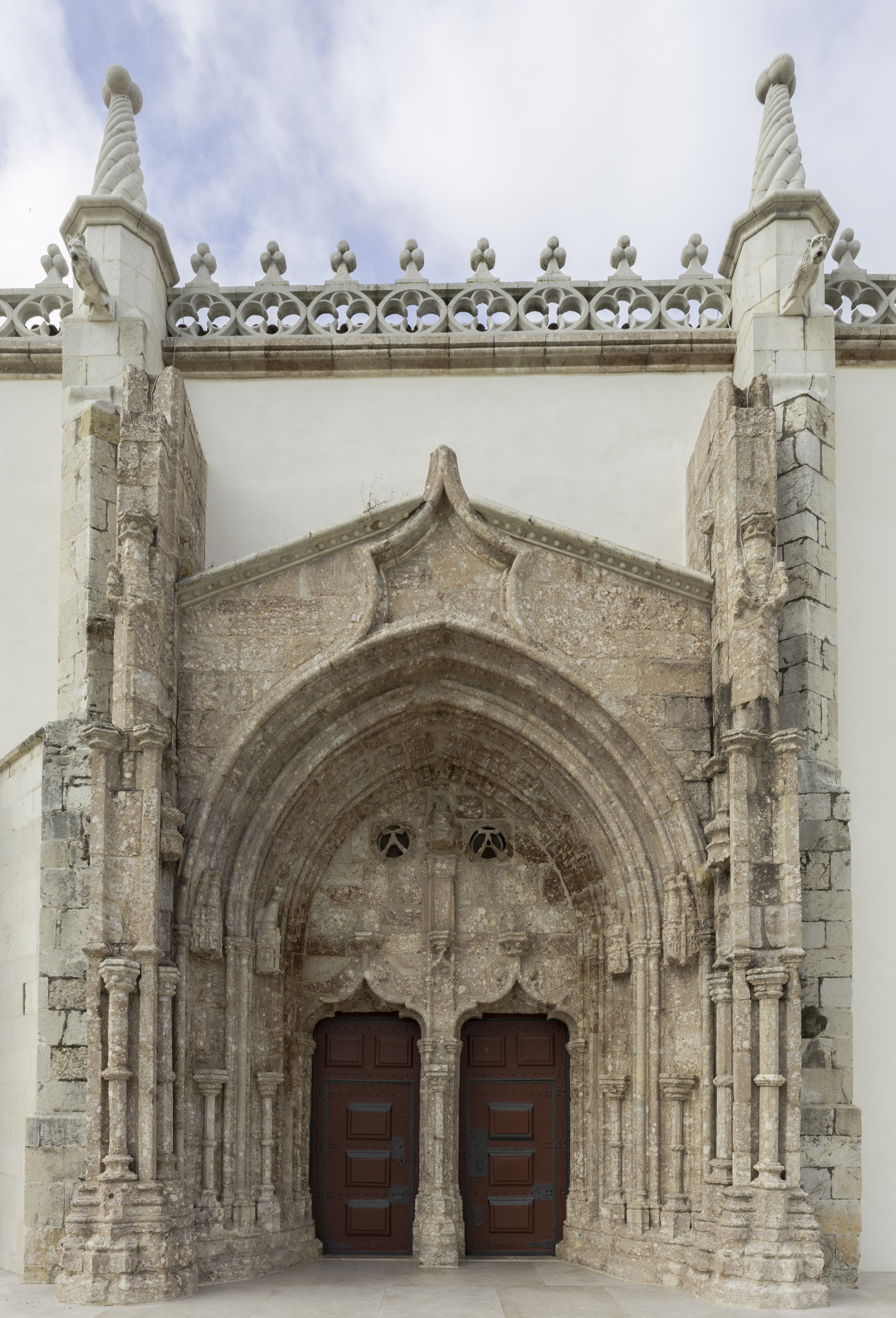
Portal

The church of the Monastery of Jesus, built between 1490 and 1510, is a very significant monument of Portuguese architecture, since it is the earliest known building in which aspects of the Manueline style of decoration were employed.

The South façade of the church, facing Jesus' Square, is the main façade of the building. Viewed from the square, the church combines two distinct spaces: a rectangular nave and a polygonal apse, higher than the nave, located at the East end of the building. A bell tower is located on the Western side of the façade.

The walls and vaulting of the church ceiling are supported by a series of stepped buttresses along the outer walls of nave and apse. Each buttress is decorated with gargoyles and a twisted pinnacle, while the upper walls of the church have decorative crenellations. The main portal is located in the middle of the South façade and was the last feature of the façade to be built. This portal, which has remained unfinished, is prominent in relation to the façade and has several archivolts with empty niches. The tympanum is decorated with two letters "A" inserted in an "O", and a mullion divides the entrance in two smaller, twin-arched portals. The South side of the apse is decorated by a beautiful, large mullioned window with late Gothic tracery.

=== Interior ===
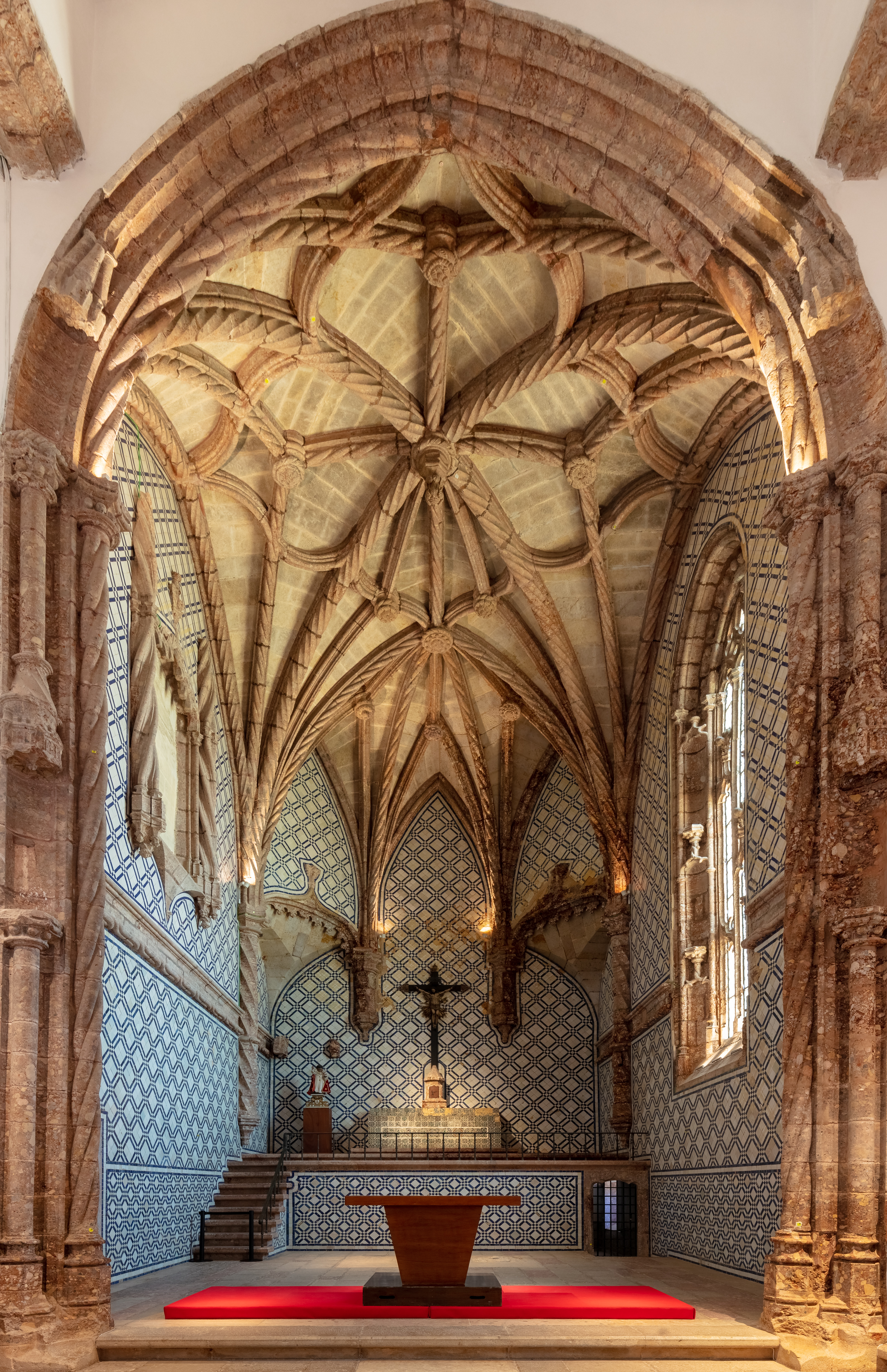
Altar of the church.

The church is rather narrow and consists of a nave and two side aisles of the same height, unifying inner space as in a hall church, a characteristic that would be found in later Manueline spaces like the nave of the Jerónimos Monastery of Lisbon. Each pillar of the nave, supporting a pointed arch, is composed of three intertwined subcolumns in rough granite. These spiralling columns, made from Breccia from the Serra da Arrábida) would also be a typical theme in later Manueline buildings, like the Guarda Cathedral. The side aisles are supported by semi-barrel vaults.

The main chapel of the church has a square shape. It is covered by an exuberant late Gothic star-ribbed vaulting with decorative bosses. Some of the ribs of the vault have the shape of a twisted rope, again anticipating a common theme in Manueline vaultings throughout the country. The main altar and the pulpit date from the 18th century.

The inner walls of the apse are decorated with 17th-century blue-and-white tiles (azulejos) with geometric patterns, while the azulejos on the side walls of the church depict scenes from the life of Maria, bordered by colourful frames.

== Museu de Jesus ==
The adjacent monastery has been turned into an art museum with a top collection of Flemish and Portuguese Primitive painters from the 15th and 16th centuries. Under King Manuel I (around 1520), the church was decorated with a 14-panel, painted altarpiece by one of Portugal's main Renaissance artists, Jorge Afonso. The altarpiece, one of the best in Portugal, was removed from the apse of the church in the 18th century but can still be seen in this Art Museum of the Monastery.

The rest of the collection consists of archaeological finds, historical coins, old documents and books. Another part of the museum is dedicated to Manuel Maria Barbosa du Bocage, a famous 18th-century poet born in Setúbal.

== Sources ==
- Portuguese Institute for Architectural Heritage ippar.pt
- General Bureau for National Buildings and Monuments (Portugal) monumentos.gov.pt
- Rentes de Carvalho, J. - Portugal, um guia para amigos (in Dutch translation : Portugal); de Arbeiderspers, Amsterdam; 9th ed., August 1999; ISBN 90-295-3466-4
- Ferreira de Almeida, C.A. A Igreja de Jesús de Setúbal. Revista da Faculdade de Letras (1990) pdf
