= Setúbal (surname) =

Setúbal is a surname. Notable people with the surname include:

- Olavo Setúbal (1923–2008), Brazilian industrialist, banker and politician
- Paulo Setúbal (1893–1937), Brazilian writer, lawyer, journalist, essayist, and poet
