= Huguet =

- Died: 1438
- Other names: Houet; Ouguete
- Occupation: Architect
- Style: Gothic
- Spouse: Maria Esteves (married 1436/1437)

Huguet (died 1438), also written as Houet or Ouguete, was a possibly Catalan architect living in the early 15th century and active in Portugal, who introduced the Flamboyant Gothic style to Portugal. He played an important role in the evolution of Gothic architecture in Portugal throughout the 15th and the early 16th centuries.

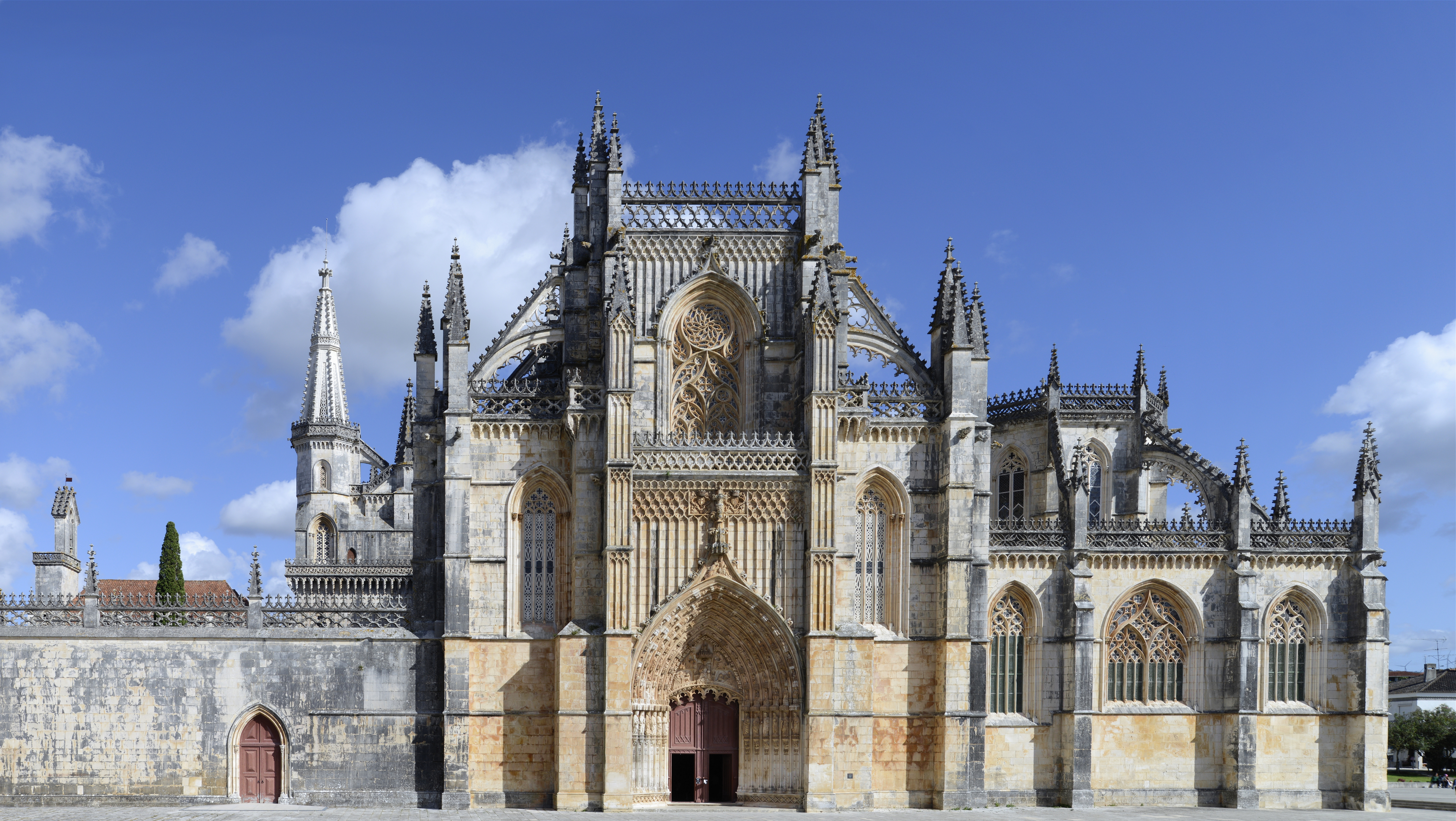
Monastery of Batalha

== Life ==
The origins of Huguet are unclear. One hypothesis states that he came from the Mediterranean coast of Catalonia. Another states that he was called David Huguet and came from Ireland. He may have been recommended to Queen Philippa of Lancaster by the master mason Henry Yevele, builder of the naves of Westminster Abbey and Canterbury Cathedral, or Henry Yevele may have sent a few English architects, or both.

Huguet married Maria Esteves between 1436 and 1437 and was allocated a house and property near the monastery by King Duarte.

== Monastery of Batalha ==
In 1402, Huguet took over the construction of the Monastery of Batalha from the first architect Afonso Domingues. At that time only parts of the church, transept and chapter house had been finished. Huguet would continue the construction of this immense building until his death in 1438. Under his direction the church, the cloisters and the chapter house were completed. He was later succeed the Portuguese architects Martin Vasquez and Fernão de Évora.

Nave and choir

His first task was to close the vaults of the existing parts of the monastery. He raised the vast and narrow nave of the church to its present height of 32.4 m, altering considerably the proportions of the church and giving it its present towering aspect, a first in Portugal. This points to a certain influence of the English Early Perpendicular style, as can be found in the nave and transept of the Canterbury Cathedral. He simplified the nave's groined vaults, using the same advanced techniques. He added on top of the building an openwork, traceried parapet.

The main façade of the monastery has an original Portuguese style, a mixture of Rayonnant and Flamboyant Gothic design with strong horizontal lines contrasting with elements of English Perpendicular, that finds few parallels in Europe.

Master Huguet built the square Founder's chapel between 1426 and 1434 on orders of King João I to become the first royal pantheon in Portugal, a mausoleum for the Aviz dynasty. In this chapel he introduced a new decorative style, a synthesis between Flamboyant Gothic and the English Perpendicular style. All elements, arches, and emblazonry have been executed with delicacy.

The square Chapter House is notable for its complex star vault lacking a central support and spanning a space of 19 square metres (200 sq ft). This was so innovative at the time that prisoners, condemned to death, had to perform the task. The task was completed after two failed attempts. When the last scaffolds were removed, it is said that Huguet spent the night under the vault to silence his critics who thought that vault could not hold.

The stellar vault of the Founder's Chapel

The carved tracery decoration in Gothic style (including quatrefoils, fleurs-de-lis and rosettes) by Huguet in the ambulatory of the cloister of King João I now forms a combination with the Manueline style in the arcade screens, added later by Mateus Fernandes.

In 1437, towards the end of his life, he started the construction of the mausoleum for King Duarte. This is a testimony to the fact that the monastery was never finished and are called therefore the Imperfect Chapels. They form a separate octagonal structure tacked on the choir of the church (via a retrochoir) and only accessible from the outside. The octagonal rotunda has seven radiating hexagonal chapels. There are several earlier Spanish examples of such a construction as the chapel of Alvaro de Luna (in the Cathedral of Toledo) and the chapel of the Condestable (in the cathedral of Burgos). The original design of Huguet was later altered beyond recognition by successive architects, especially Mateus Fernandes.
