= Hôtel de Guillaume de Bernuy =

- Hôtel de Buet
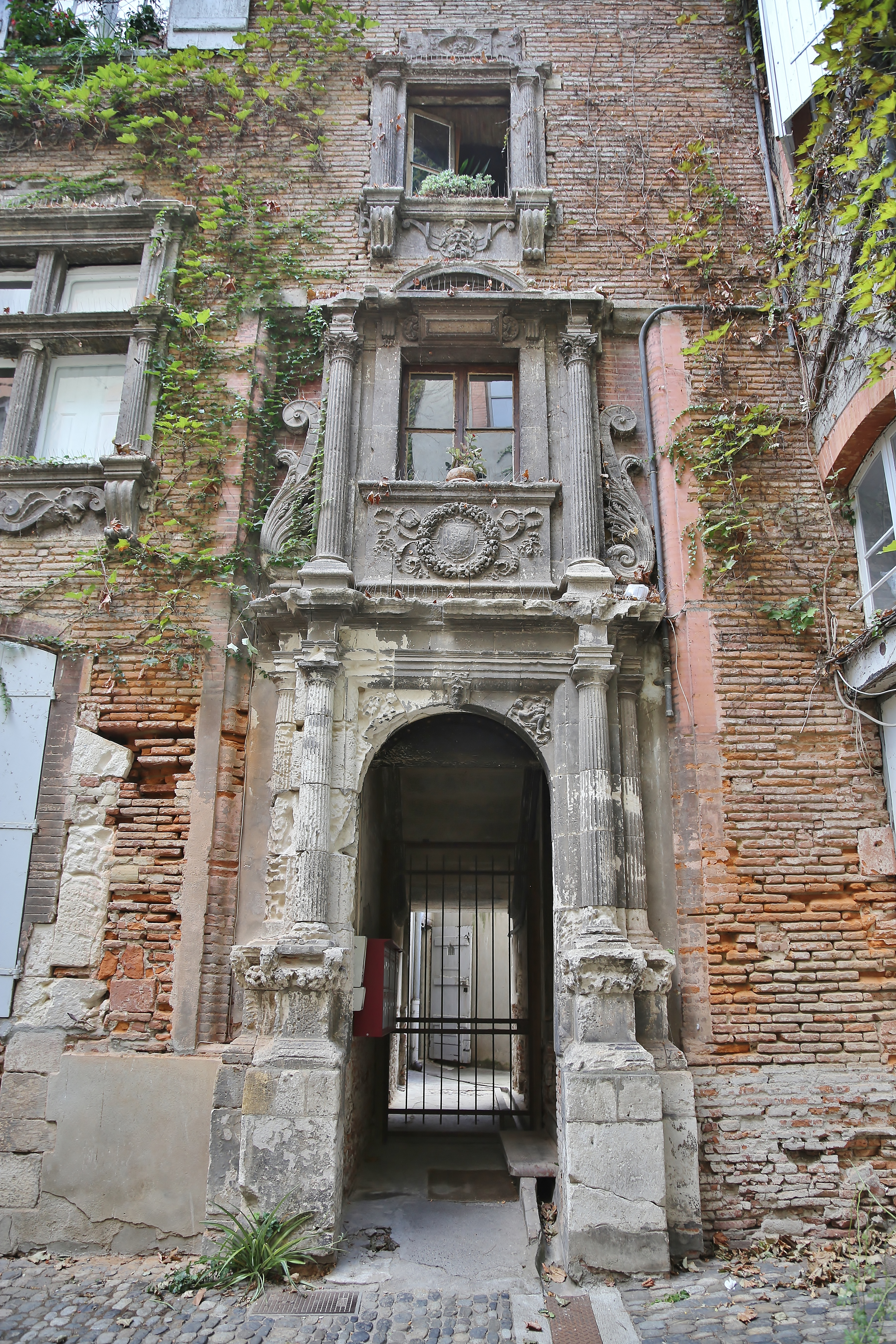
- Facade details in the courtyard

- Location within France
- 43.602080°N 1.446437°E
- Type: Hôtel particulier
- Location: 5 rue de la Pomme, Toulouse, France

History
- Built for: Guillaume de Bernuy
- Rebuilt: 1544

Site notes
- Architect: Nicolas Bachelier
- Architectural styles: Renaissance, Doric
- Owner: Privately owned

Monument historique
- Designated: 1993-08-30
- Reference no.: PA00094550

The Hôtel de Guillaume de Bernuy, also known as Hôtel de Buet, located at 5 rue de la Pomme, in Toulouse, France, is a Renaissance hôtel particulier (palace) of the 16th century.

This hôtel was built around 1540. Portal and windows of Nicolas Bachelier in the courtyard. During the 1562 riots the building was badly damaged requiring considerable restoration.

This hôtel should not be confused with the more famous Hôtel de Bernuy, built for Jean de Bernuy.

== History ==
Circa 1540, Guillaume de Bernuy, son of the famous woad merchant Jean de Bernuy, undertook the renovation of an old house by employing the famous architect and sculptor Nicolas Bachelier. From 1540 to 1544 Bachelier built a main house with two floors, which separated the courtyard from the garden and which stood at right angles with another building. Its staircase, as Bachelier previously did at Hôtel de Bagis, is straight and contained within the building. Its façade is remarkable for its monumental door, windows and a truncated dormer window. In keeping with the logic of mediaeval honour, the walls are capped with decorative machicolation.

Bachelier focused his efforts on the windows, also he lent more attention to the monumental door, a veritable bravura passage replacing the staircase tower in its symbolic significance. These windows display the same classical style that Bachelier developed for Hôtel de Bagis in 1538, but the upper and lower section of the frames gained in sophistication through the use of tables decorated with masks and grotesques. The motifs resemble the ornaments of Francis I Gallery in Fontainebleau Palace, that were being highly appreciated in the kingdom at that time. Designs also circulated within the bounds of the city, as demonstrated by the desire of 'classical windows' and the fact that the masks on this house were repeated on the consoles of the Hôtel d'Assézat passageway.

== Pictures ==
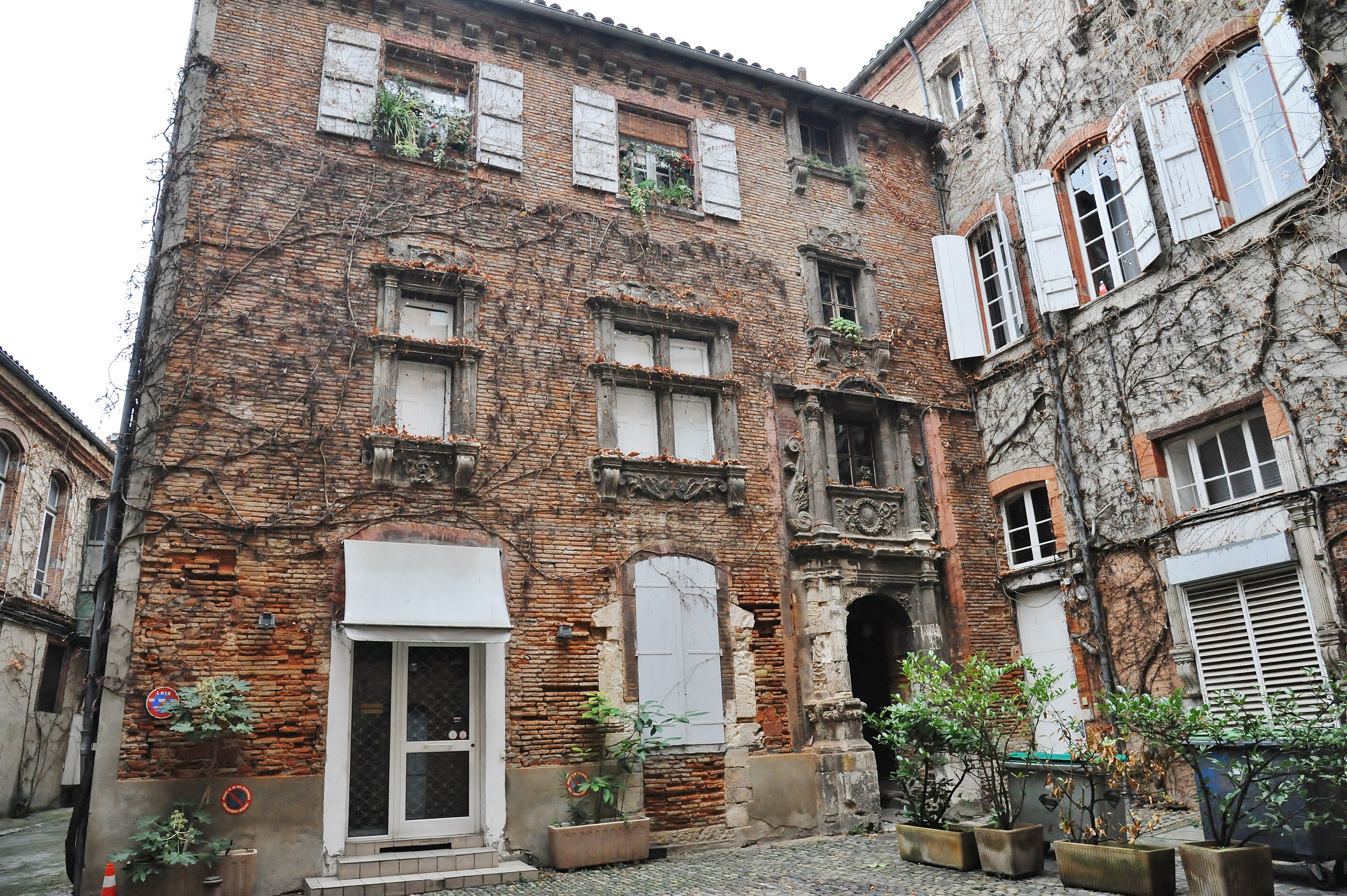
Renaissance façades in the courtyard

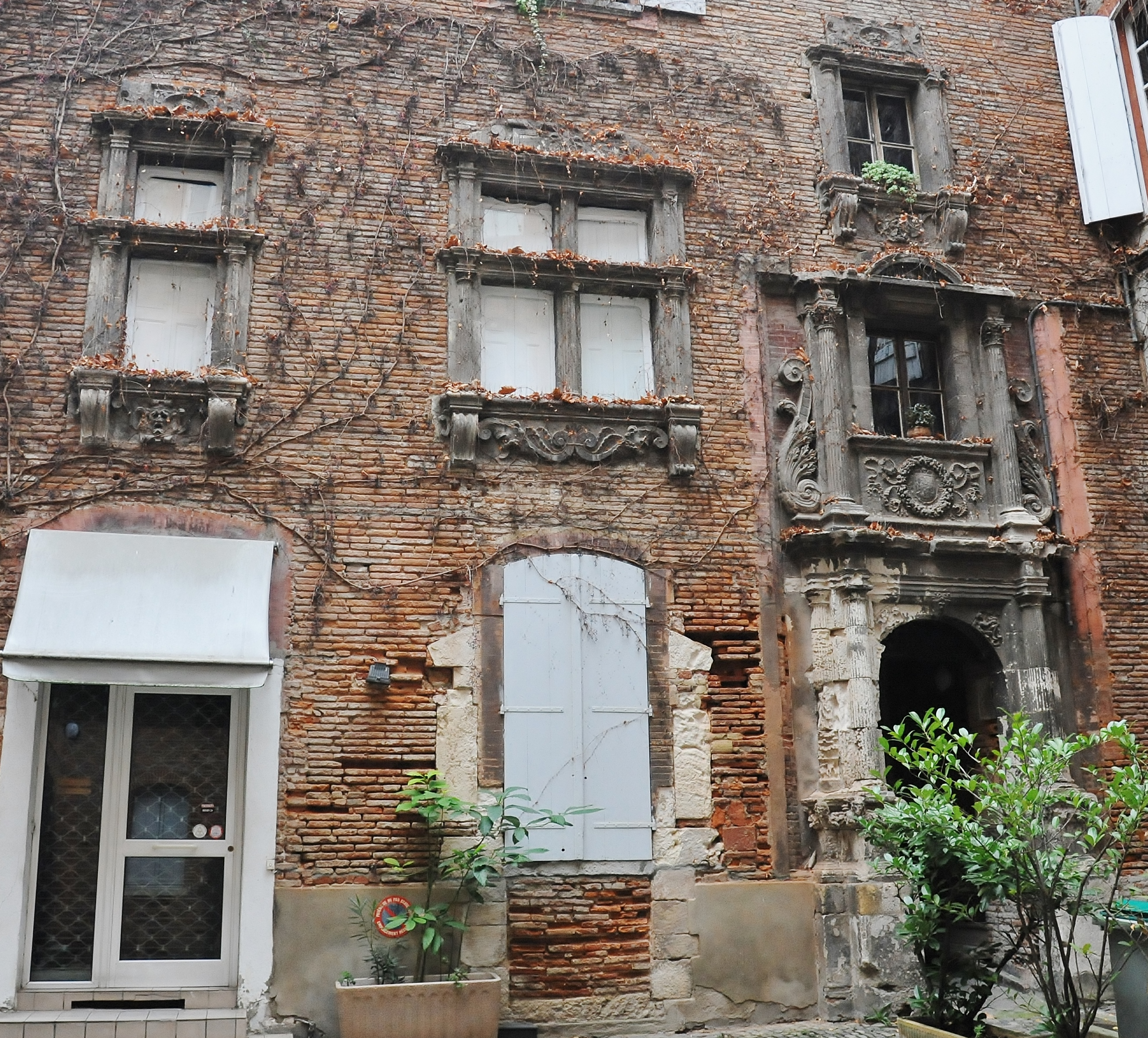
The main house

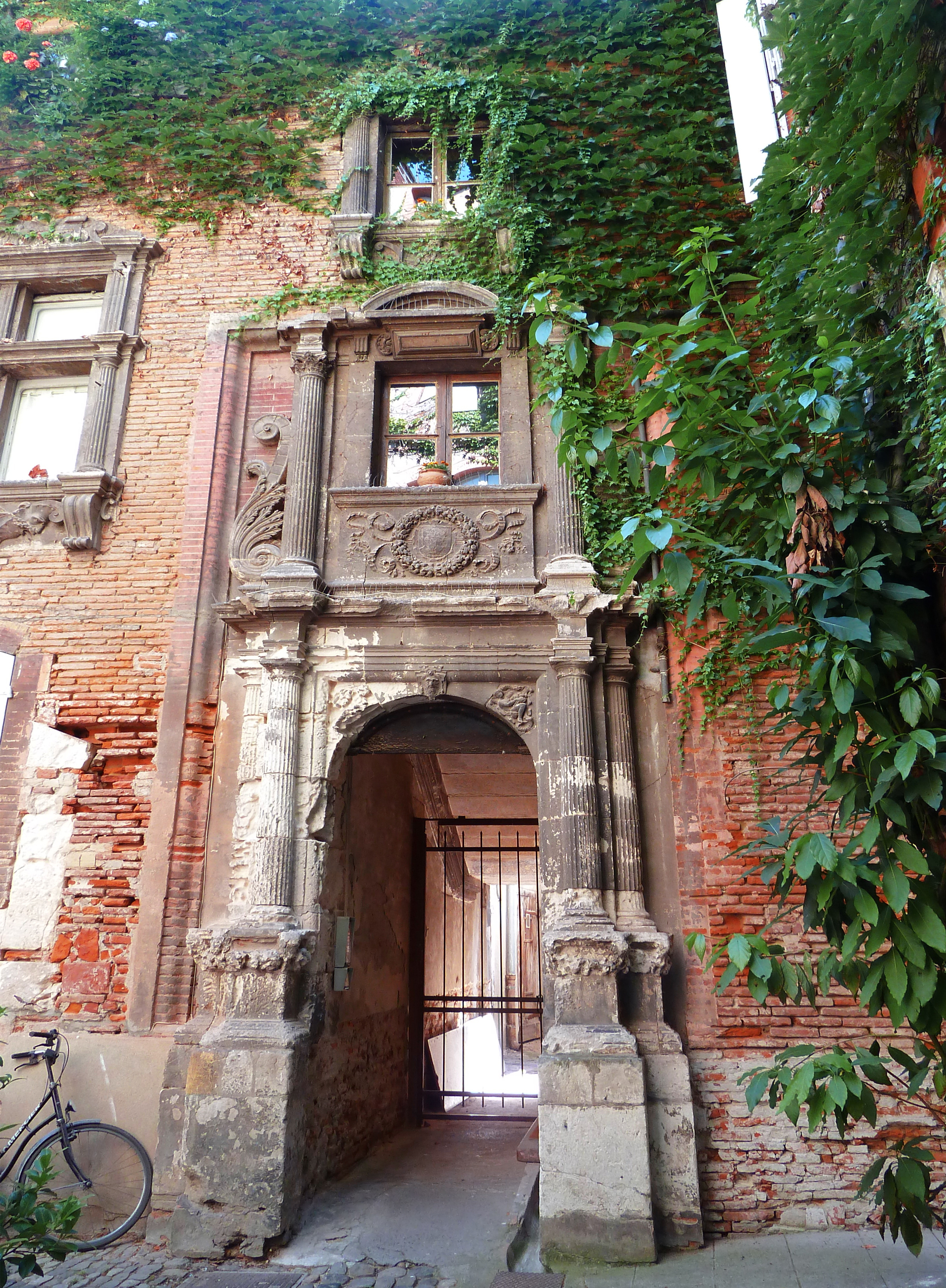
The monumental door

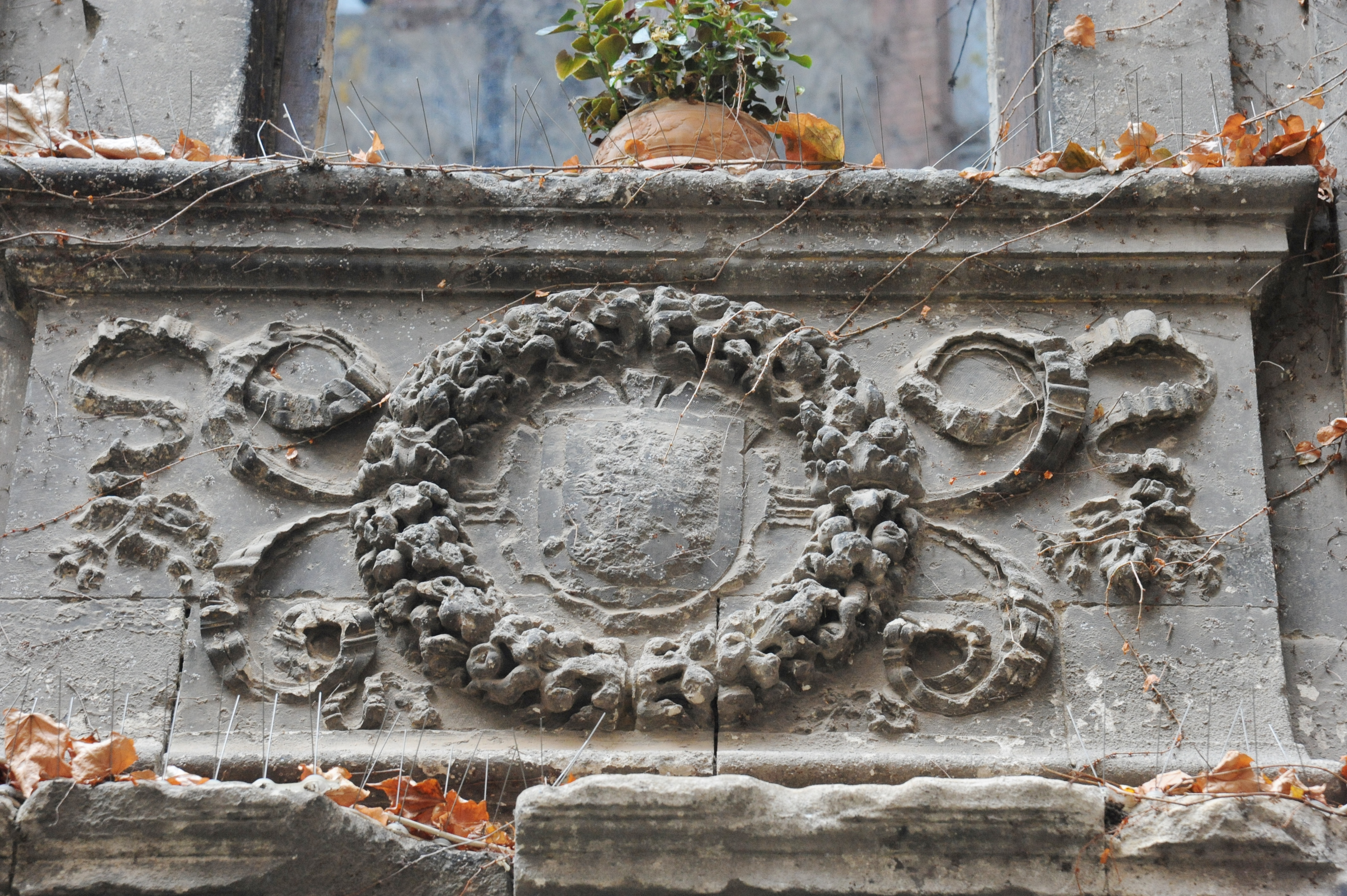

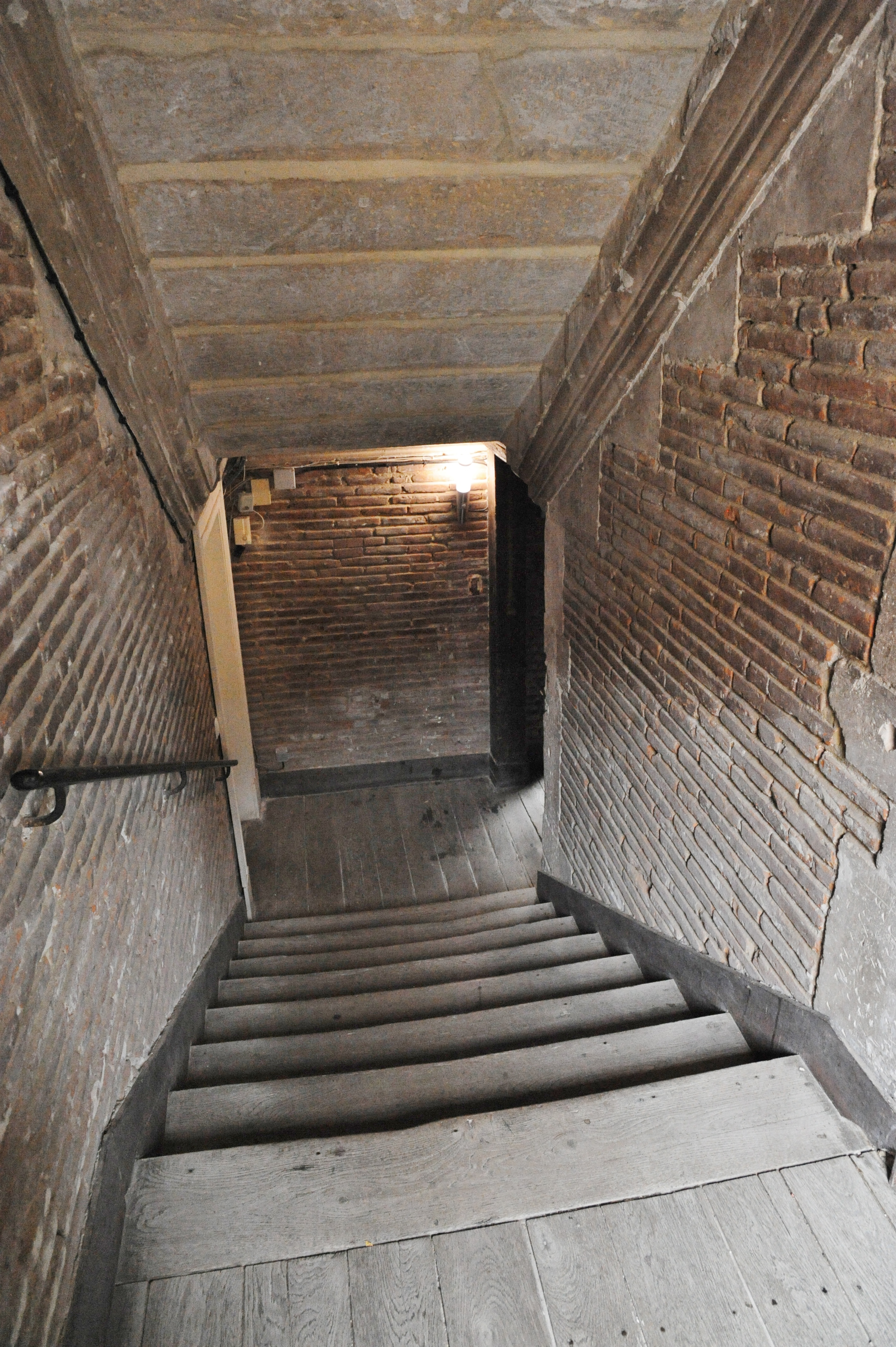
The straight staircase

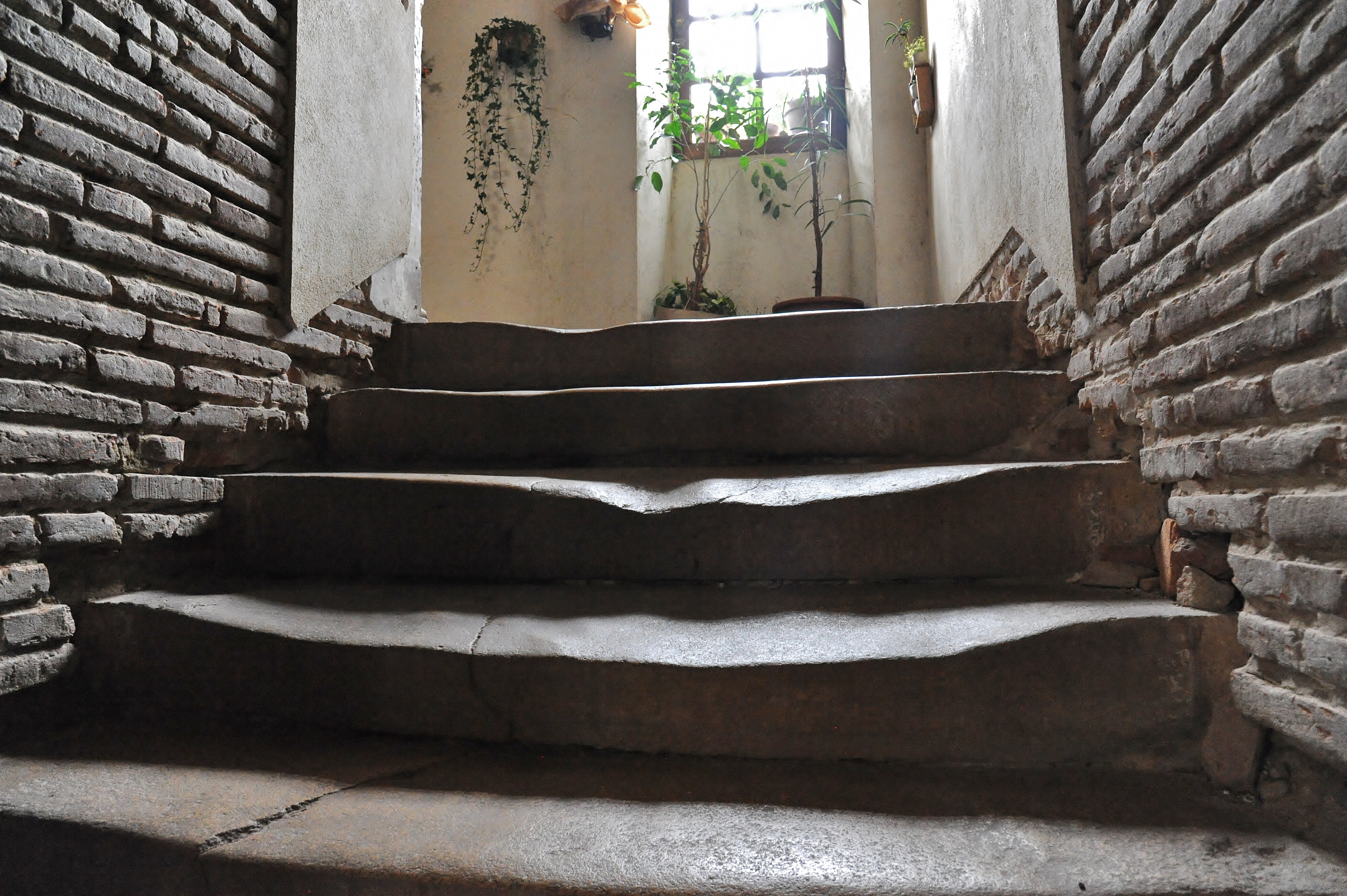
Worn stairs

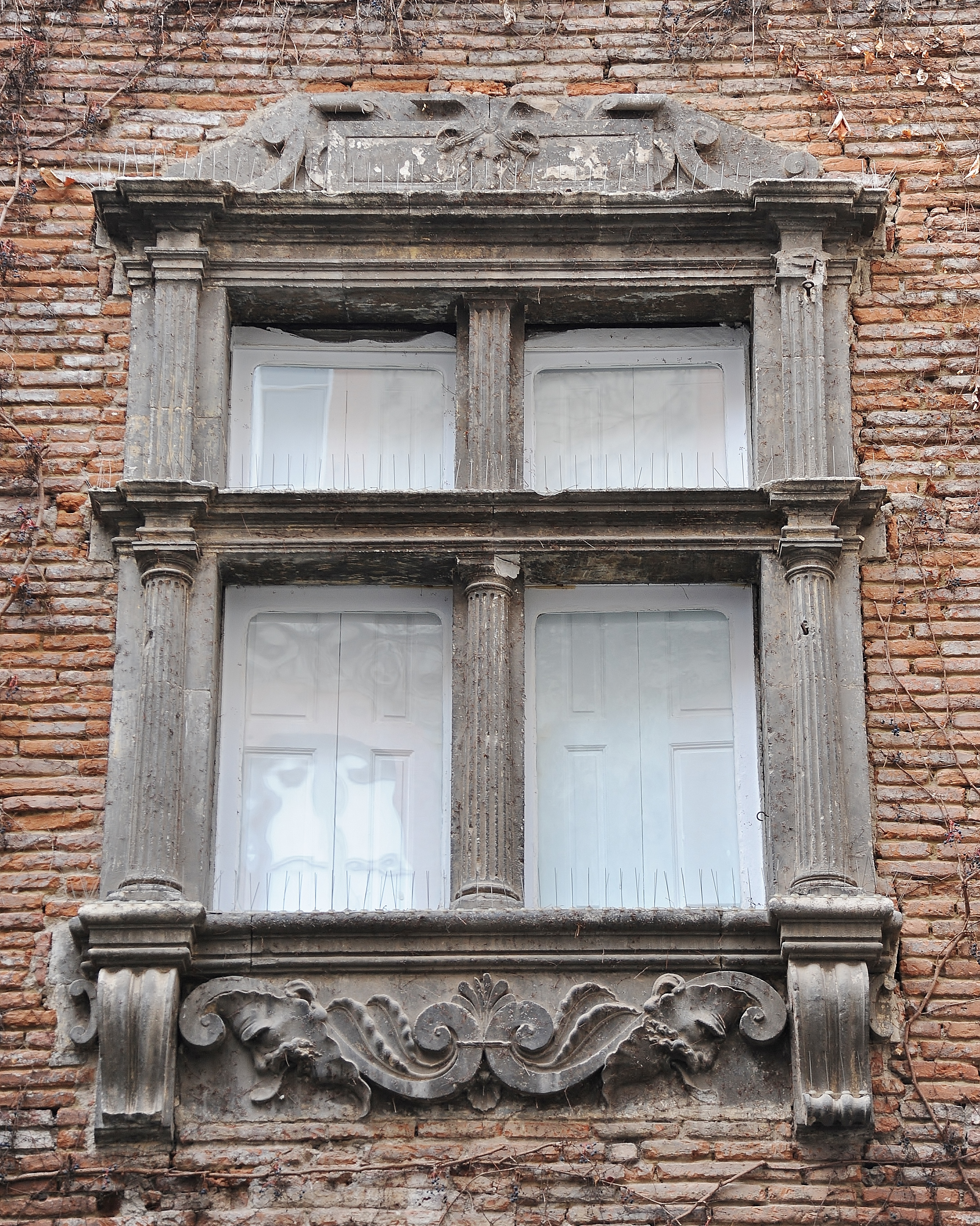
Window

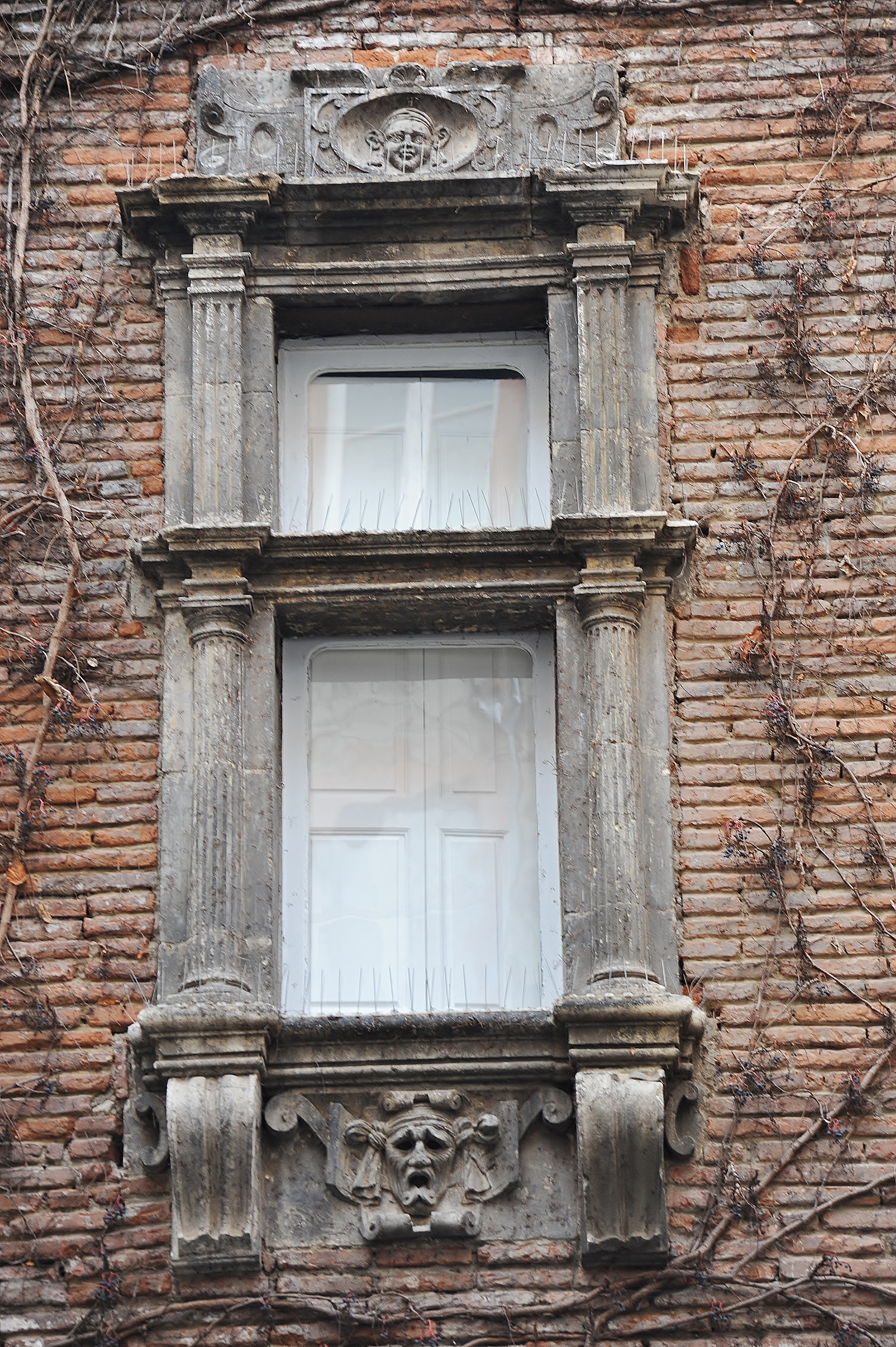
Window

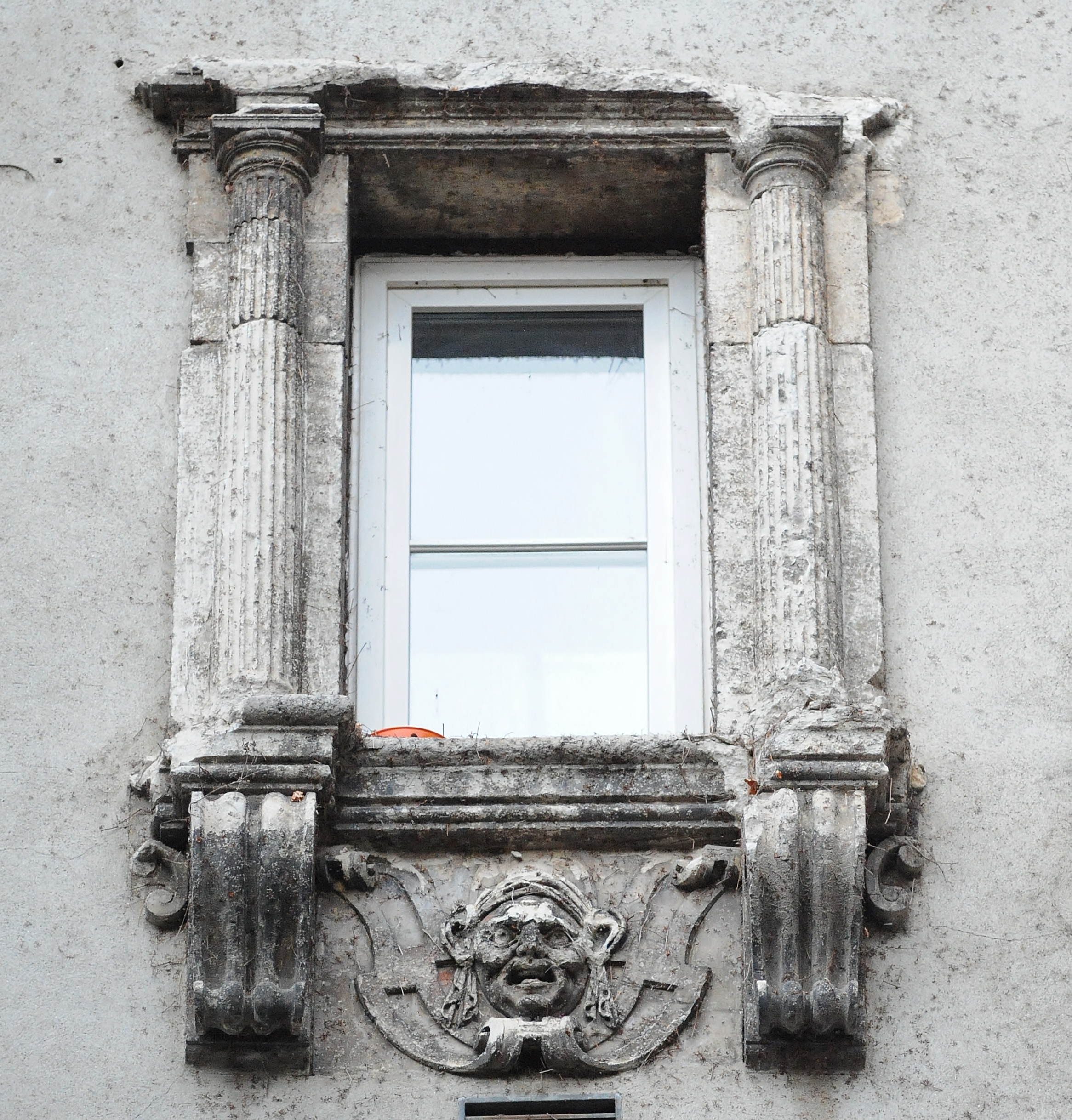
Window

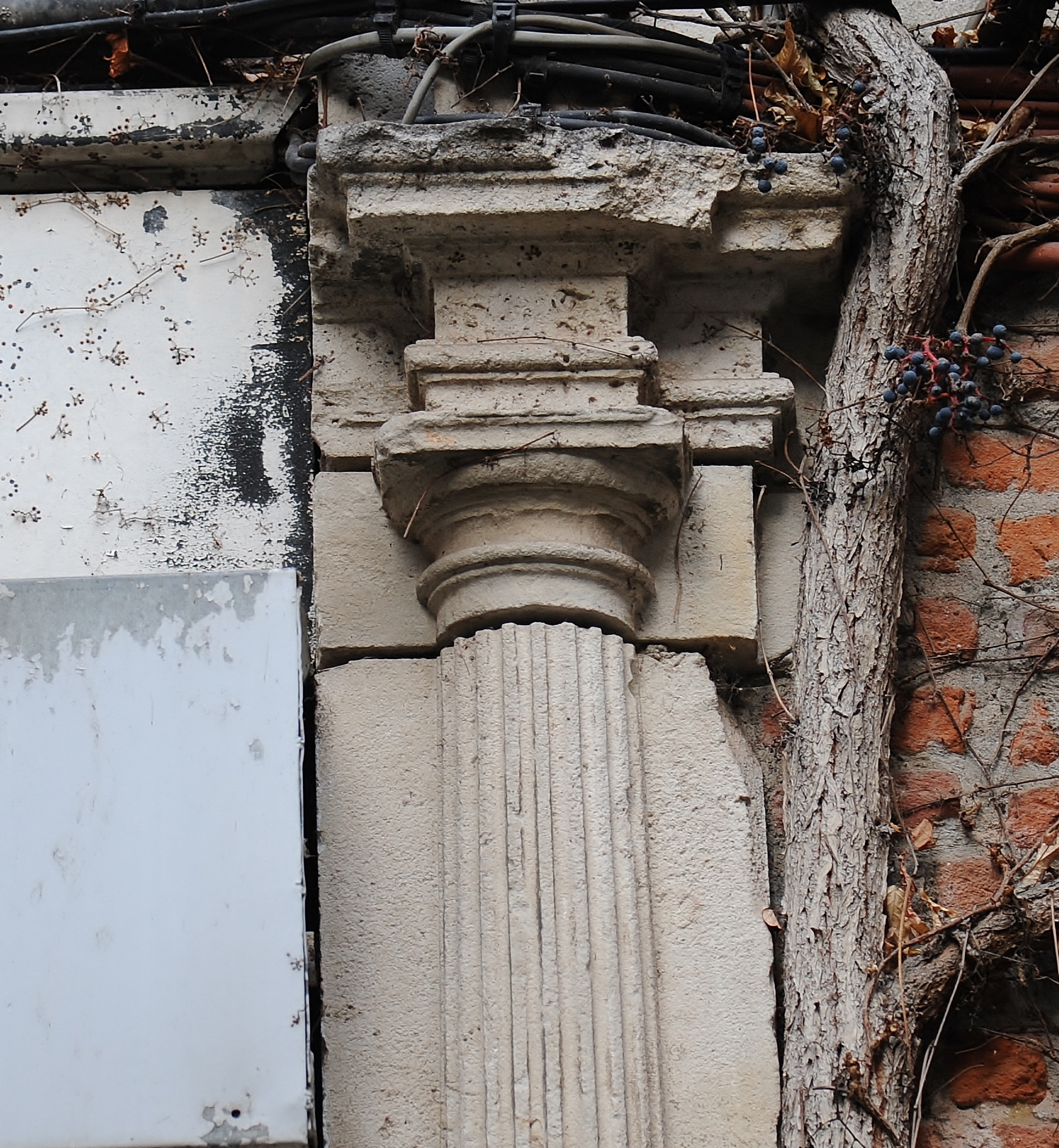
Doric column

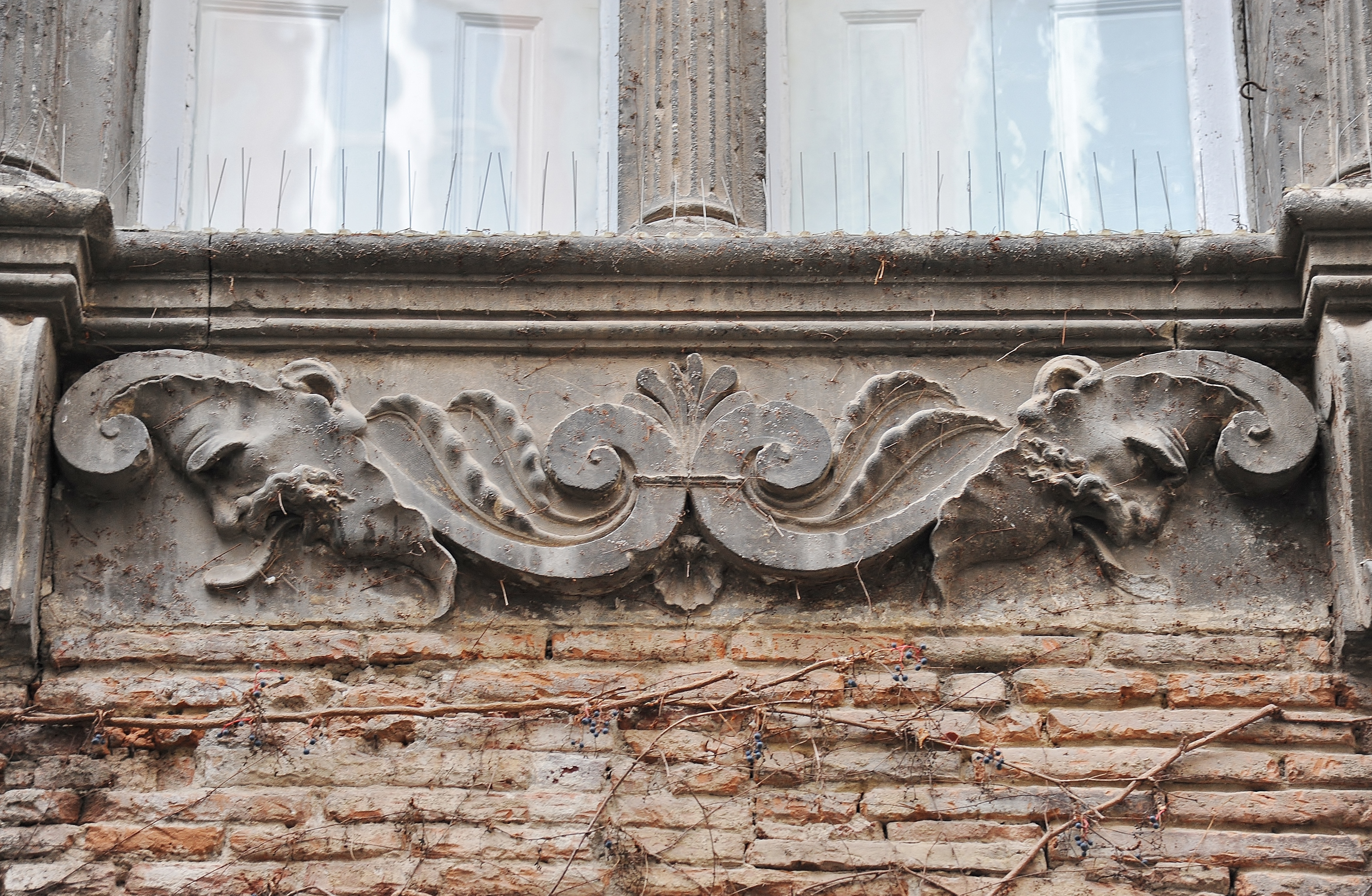
Sculpted masks depicting hybrid beings

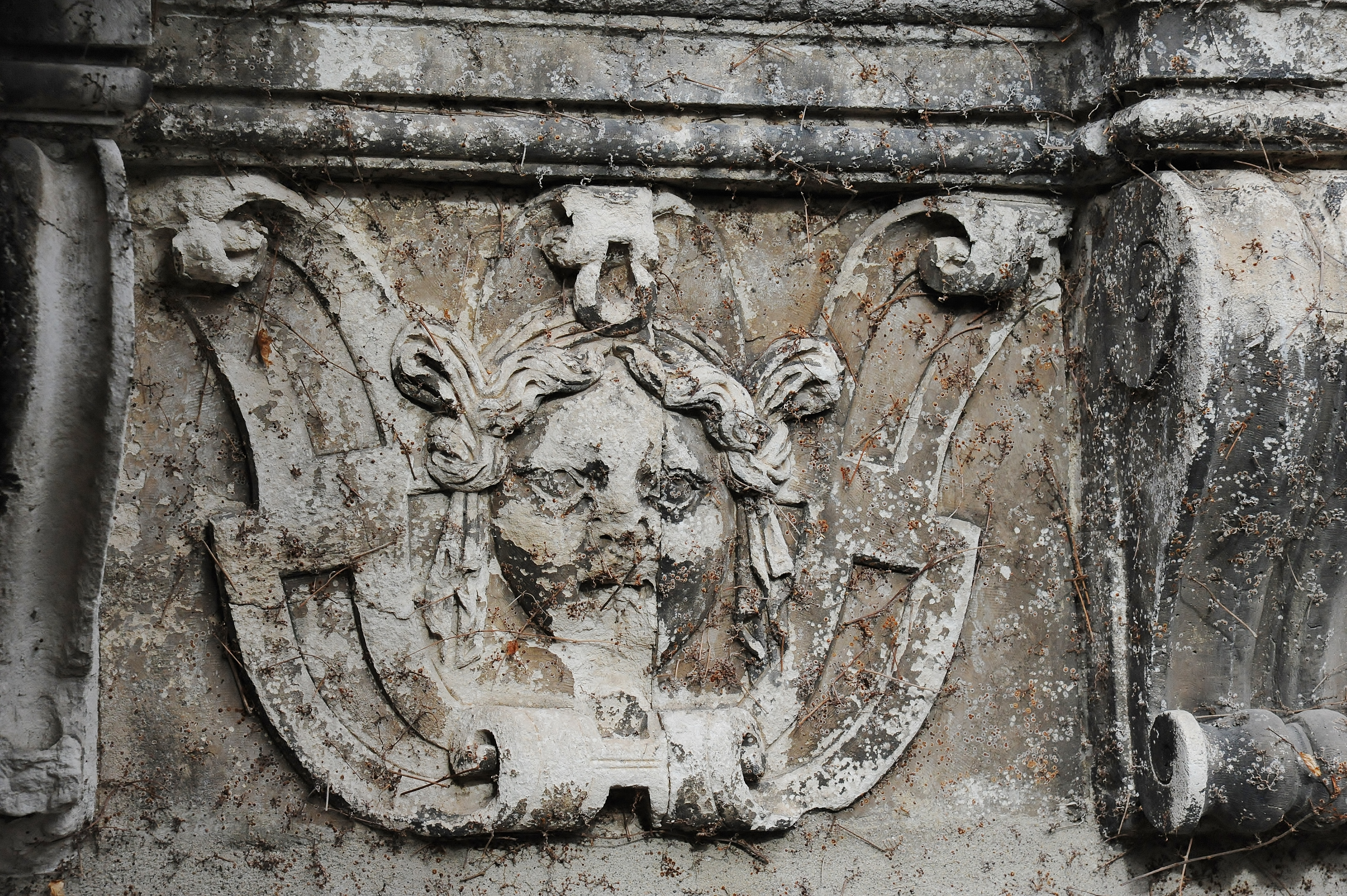
Sculpted mask of a woman

== See also ==
- Renaissance architecture of Toulouse

== Bibliography ==
- Guy Ahlsell de Toulza, Louis Peyrusse, Bruno Tollon, Hôtels et Demeures de Toulouse et du Midi Toulousain, Daniel Briand éditeur, Drémil Lafage, 1997
