= Nicolas Bachelier =

French surveyor, architect, and sculptor

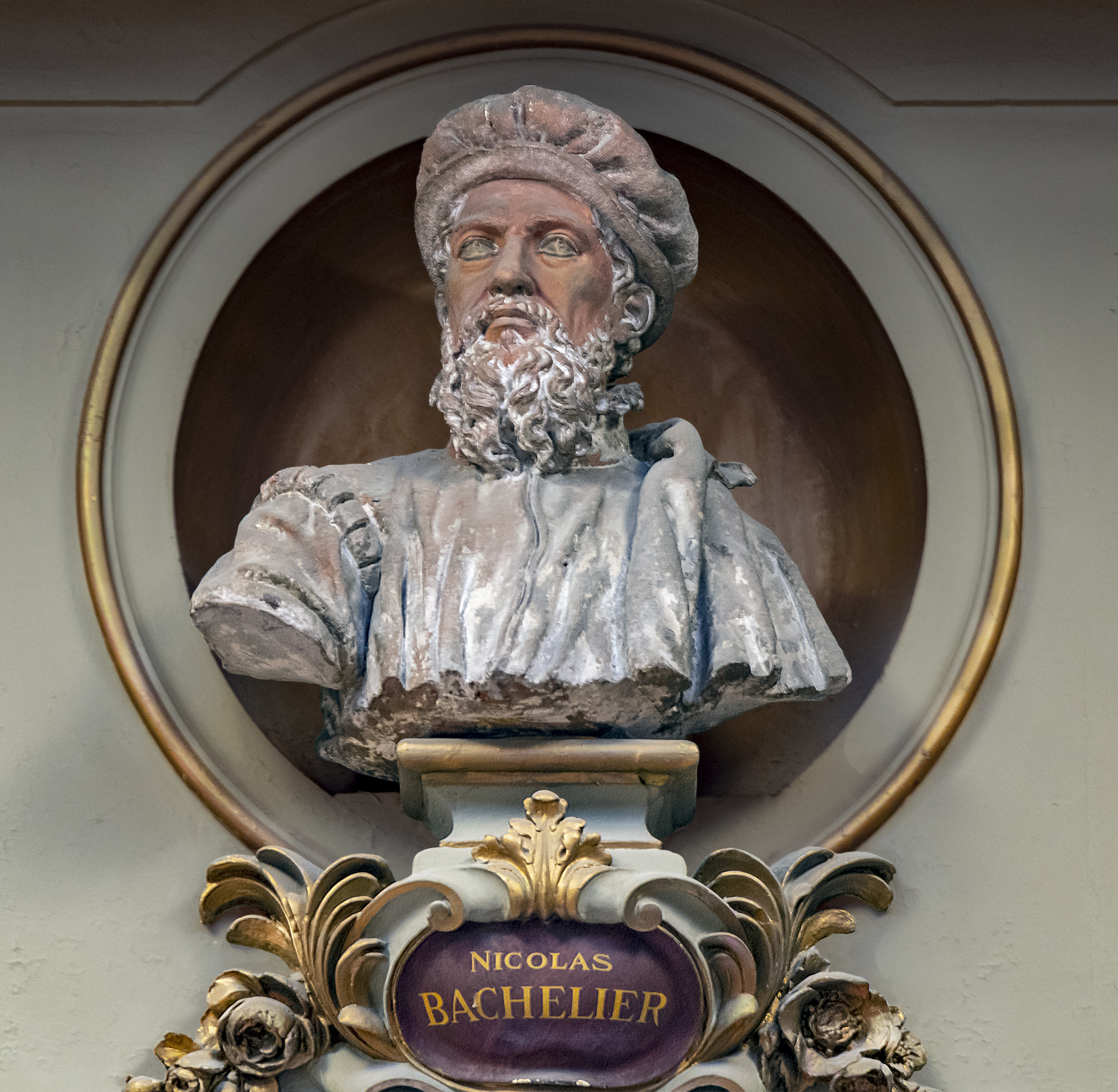
- Born: 1485
- Died: 1557 (aged 71–72); Toulouse, France
- Occupations: French surveyor, architect, and sculptor.

Nicolas Bachelier (French: [nikɔla baʃəlje]; 1485–1557) was a French surveyor, architect, and sculptor who particularly worked in Toulouse.

Bachelier is famous in Toulouse for having been the architect, proven or presumed, of several hôtels particuliers of the Renaissance, as well as for his religious sculptures. He was particularly renowned for his great scholarly culture.

In 1539, Bachelier and his colleague Arnaud Casanove, who described themselves as expert levelers, proposed a survey for a canal from Toulouse to Carcassonne to Francis I. Francis I had previously discussed the possibility of such a canal with Leonardo da Vinci. They also proposed that barges could either float down the Garonne River to Bordeaux or could traverse a canal parallel to the river. Francis I approved their plans which included a lock-free canal of variable depth. These plans proved to be inaccurate and could not be executed. In 1598, Henri IV re-examined the plans, but nothing was done until Pierre Paul Riquet began the successful endeavor of the Canal du Midi in 1662.

Among others, the following prestigious buildings are attributed to him:

- Hôtel de Bagis (1538)
- Hôtel de Guillaume de Bernuy (1540-1544)
- Hôtel d'Assézat (for the two classical façades, 1555–1556)
- Medallions of Hôtel Jean de Pins and Hôtel Thomas de Montval
- Possibly some of the telamons of Hôtel du Vieux-Raisin
