= Hôtel de Bagis =

Coordinates: 43.5970°N 1.4422°E

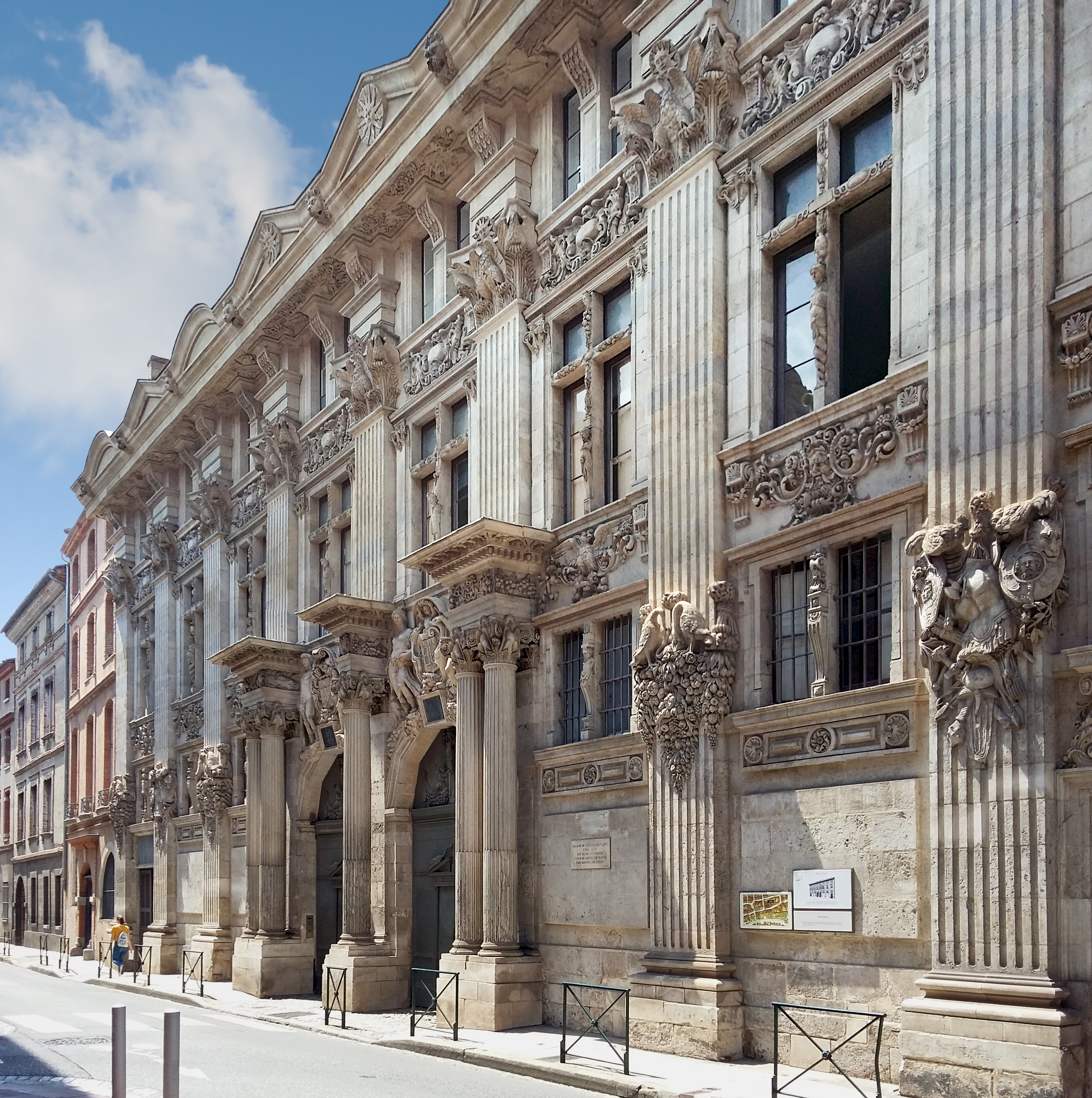
The facade of the Hôtel de Bagis.

The Hôtel de Bagis (Occitan: Ostal de Bagis) in Toulouse, France, is a Renaissance hôtel particulier (palace) of the 16th century. It is a listed historical monument since 1889.

It is also called Hôtel de Clary (Ostal de Clary), after the owner who carried out the second campaign of works at the beginning of the 17th century, or Hôtel de pierre (meaning "stone hotel"; Ostal de pèira) because of its spectacular stone façade on the street.

== History ==
The Hotel de Bagis is a mansion located at 25 rue de la Dalbade, in the historic center of Toulouse. The Toulouse people call it the Hôtel de Pierre (stone mansion), because its façade is entirely made of stone, which was unique in Toulouse in the 17th century. It is an exceptional ensemble of the Renaissance of Toulouse.

The construction of a first hotel begins in 1537 under the direction of the famous Toulouse architect Nicolas Bachelier. The hotel was modified in 1611 by the architect Pierre Souffron, who built the new façade on the street, entirely in stone. The sculptured decoration was only completed in the 19th century.

=== Facade ===
The hotel opens onto the Dalbade Street with a large facade. Composed of eight bays, its axis of symmetry is formed by the two central bays, identical, of which the one on the left only houses the gateway. The monumental facade was erected between 1609 and 1616 at the request of Gabrielle Guerrier and her husband François de Clary by the architect Pierre Souffron, assisted by several sculptors and stone-cutters who succeed each other on the building site: Pierre Bouc, Thomas Heurtematte, Pierre Monge and Arthur Legoust.

The facade is richly decorated with a carved stone decoration: pilasters, trophies of arms, garlands, fruits. François de Clary placed on the capitals of acanthus, eagles and suns which recall his coat of arms. His weapons are also placed above the gates, but they are hammered at the French Revolution. In 1855, Calvet-Besson completed the sculptures on the façade and placed the coat of arms of François de Clary and his monogram above the doors. He entrusted the realization to the architect Urbain Vitry and the sculptor Calmettes.

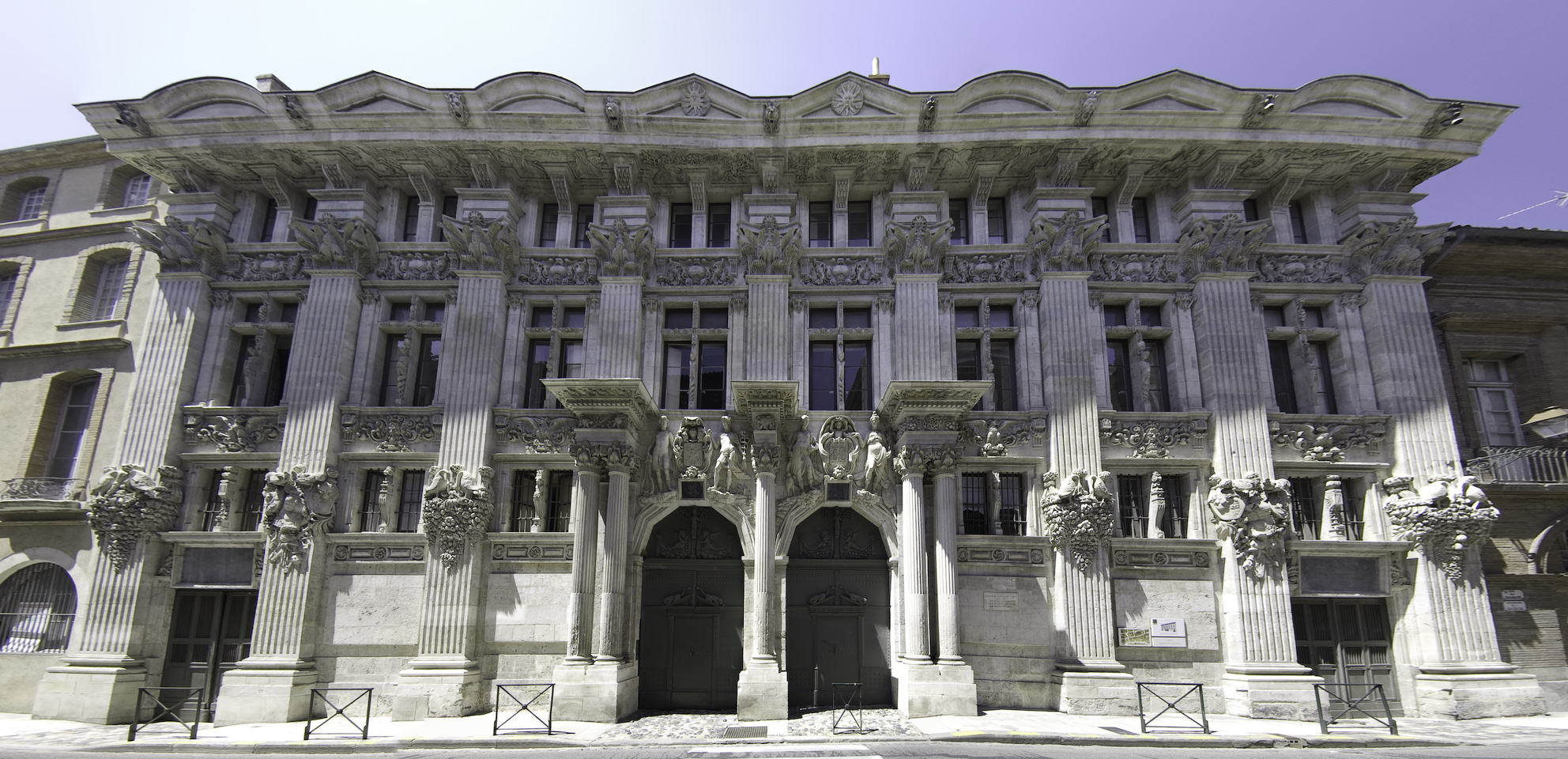

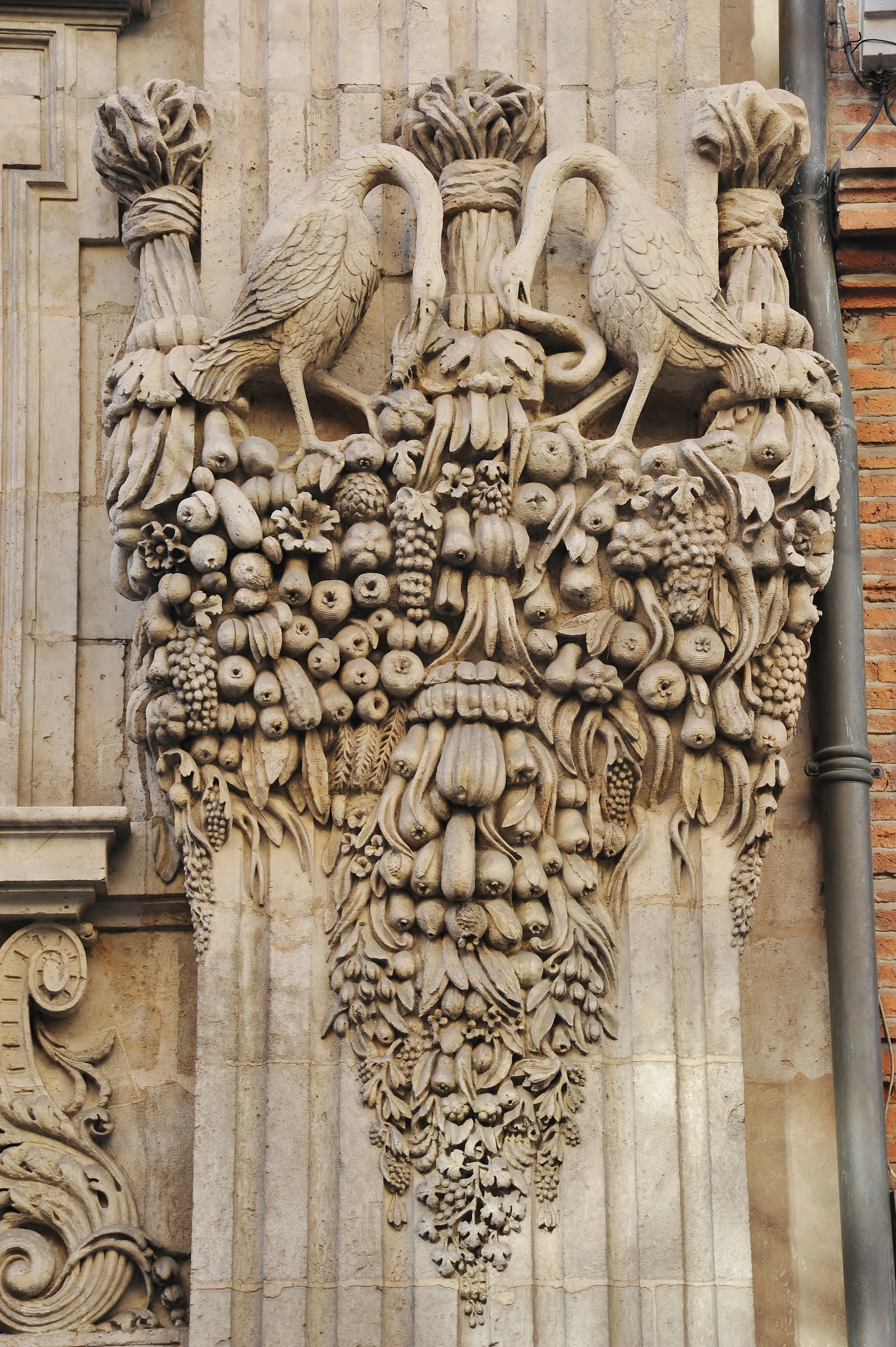

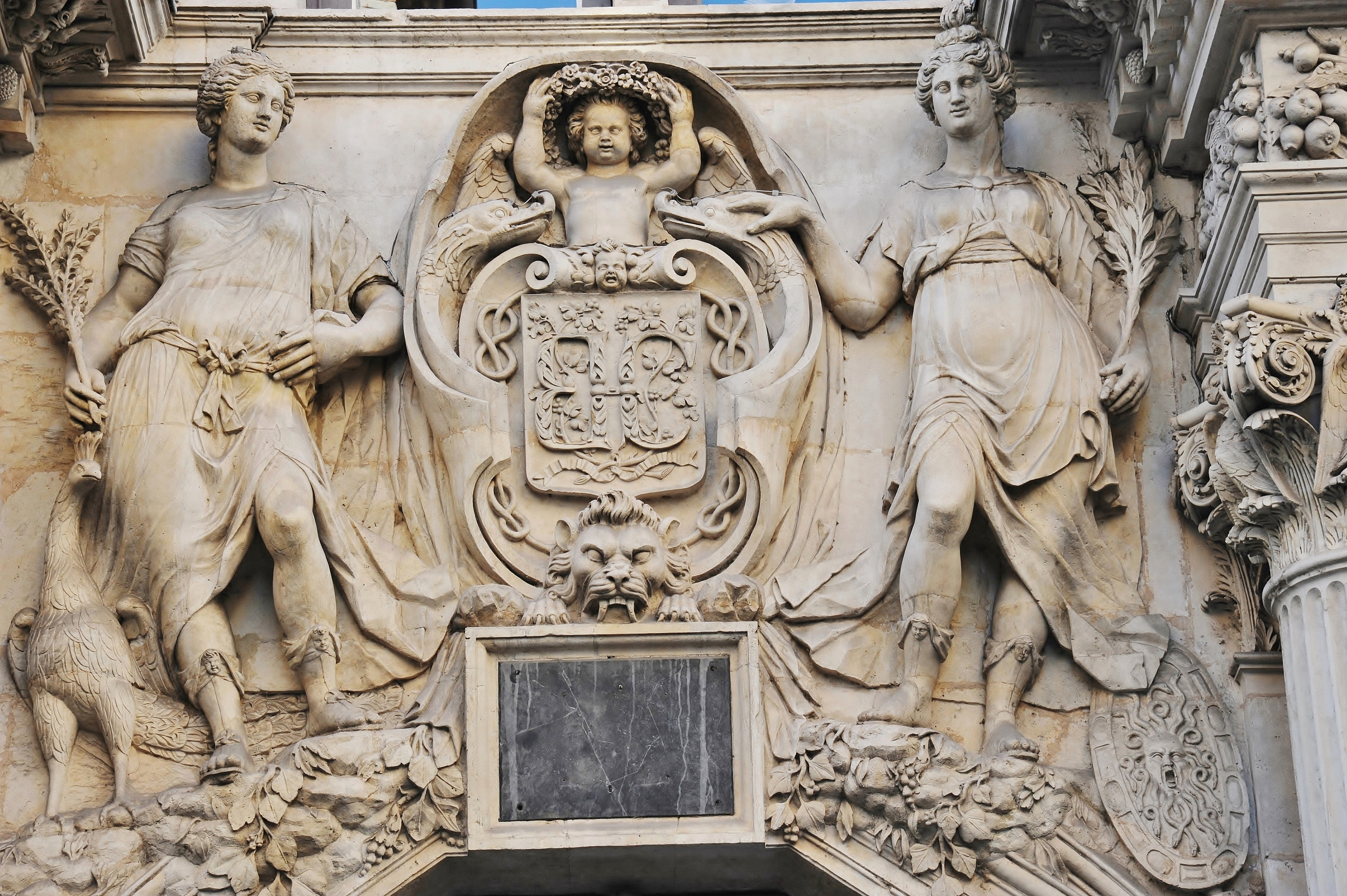

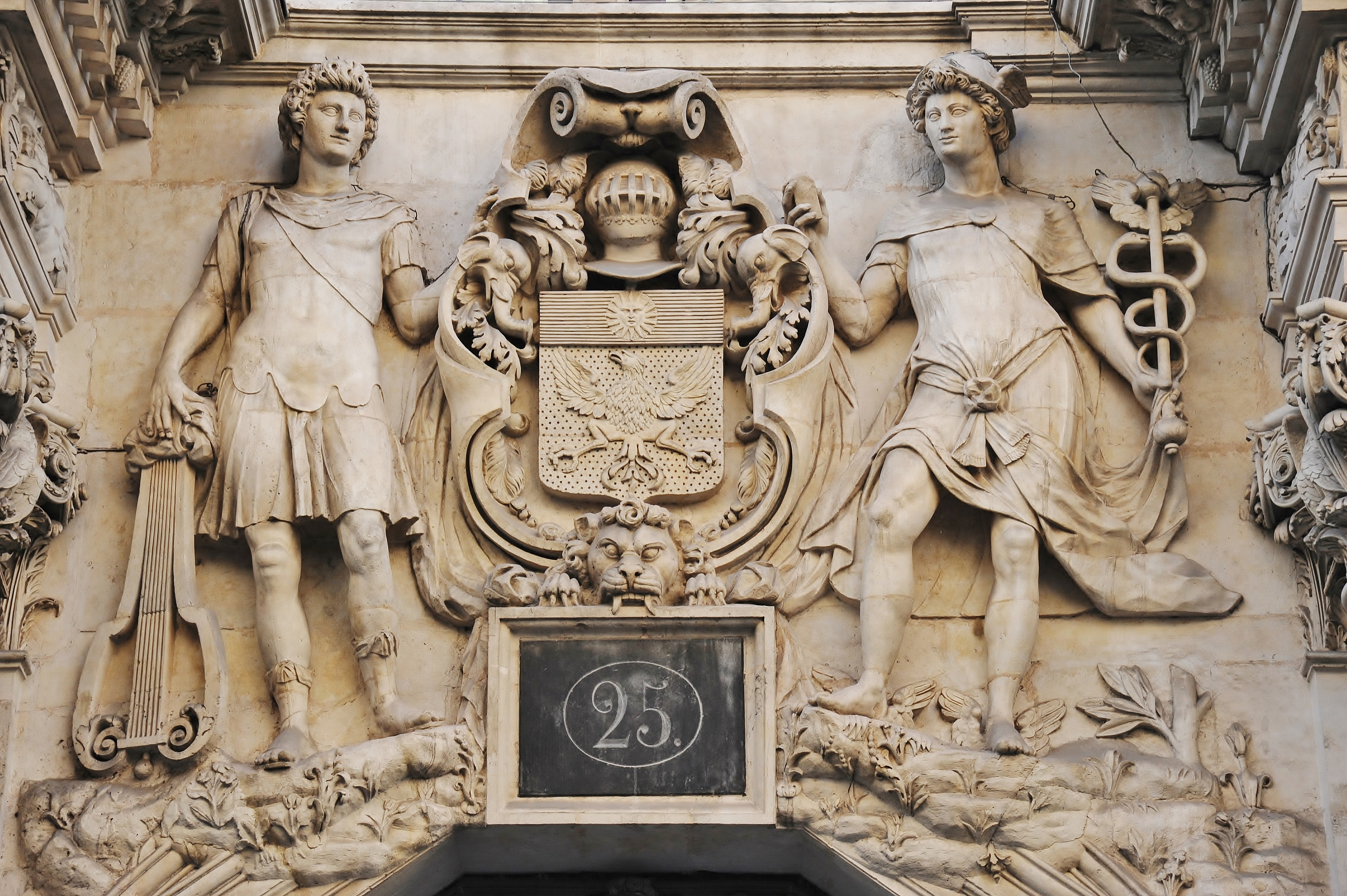

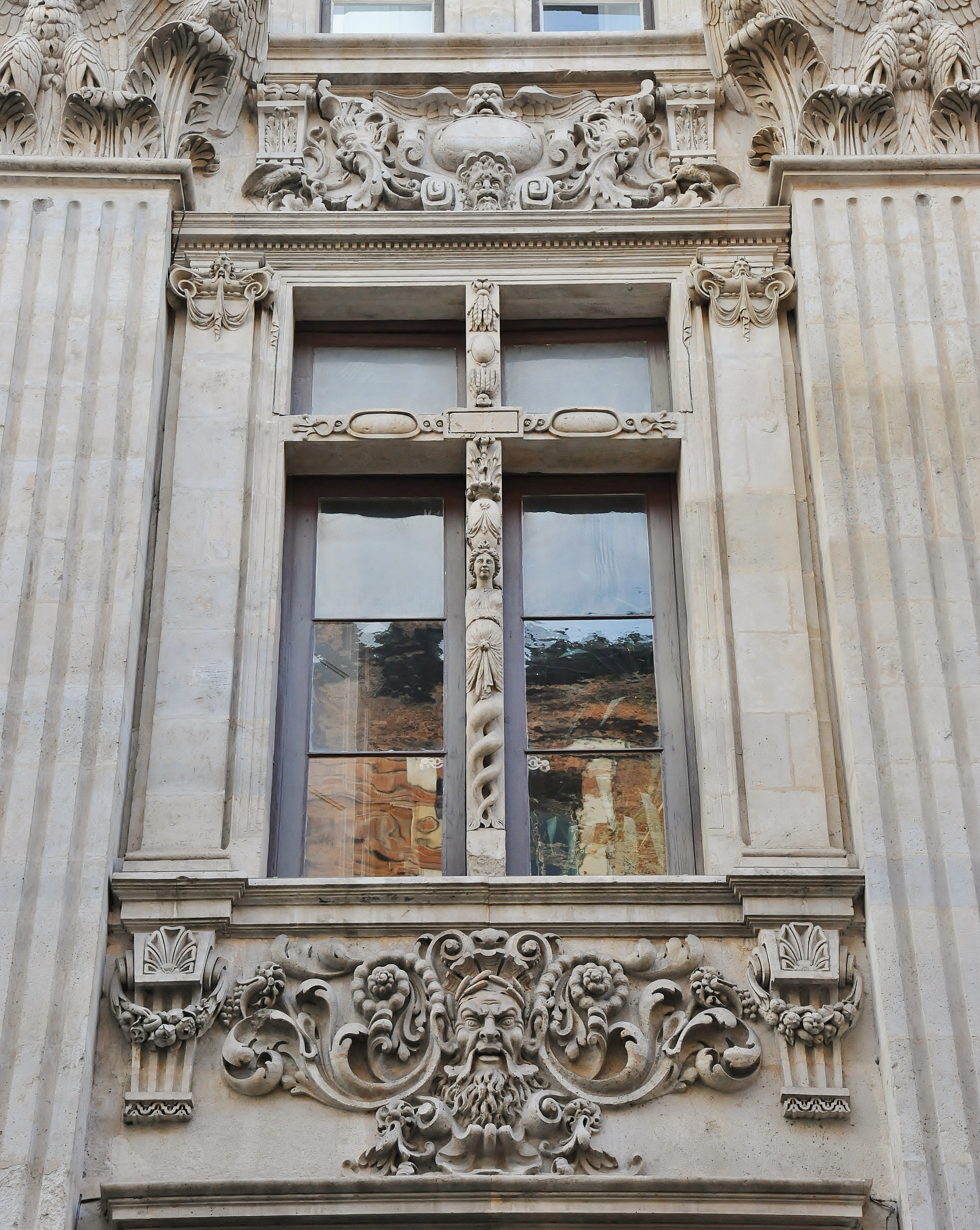

=== Courtyard ===
Nicolas Bachelier, according to the lease passed in 1537, designs four building blocks arranged in quadrilateral, open on a central courtyard. The elevations on the courtyard, where the stone and the brick are mingled, are richly ornamented. The work of Bachelier is still visible on the west elevation, which is the one which has been least altered by the campaigns of successive works. Similar openings are nevertheless found on the south and east facades. Between 1609 and 1616, François de Clary caused the façades of the south buildings to be modified and was built on a courtyard by the construction of porticos. He also affixed stone veneers with pilasters, mascarons and capitals intended to support statues

The courtyard: First campaign of works (Bagis, 1538)

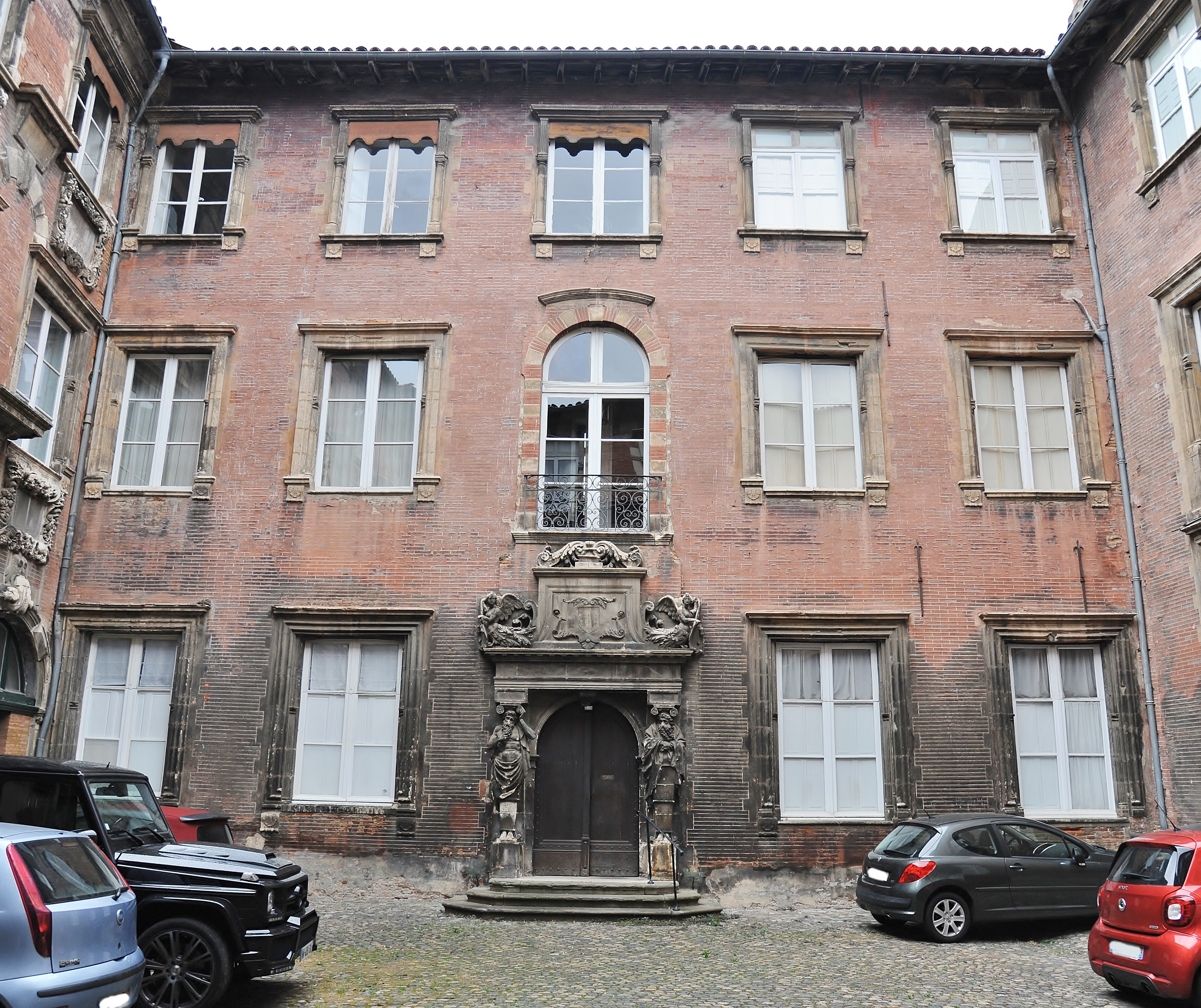

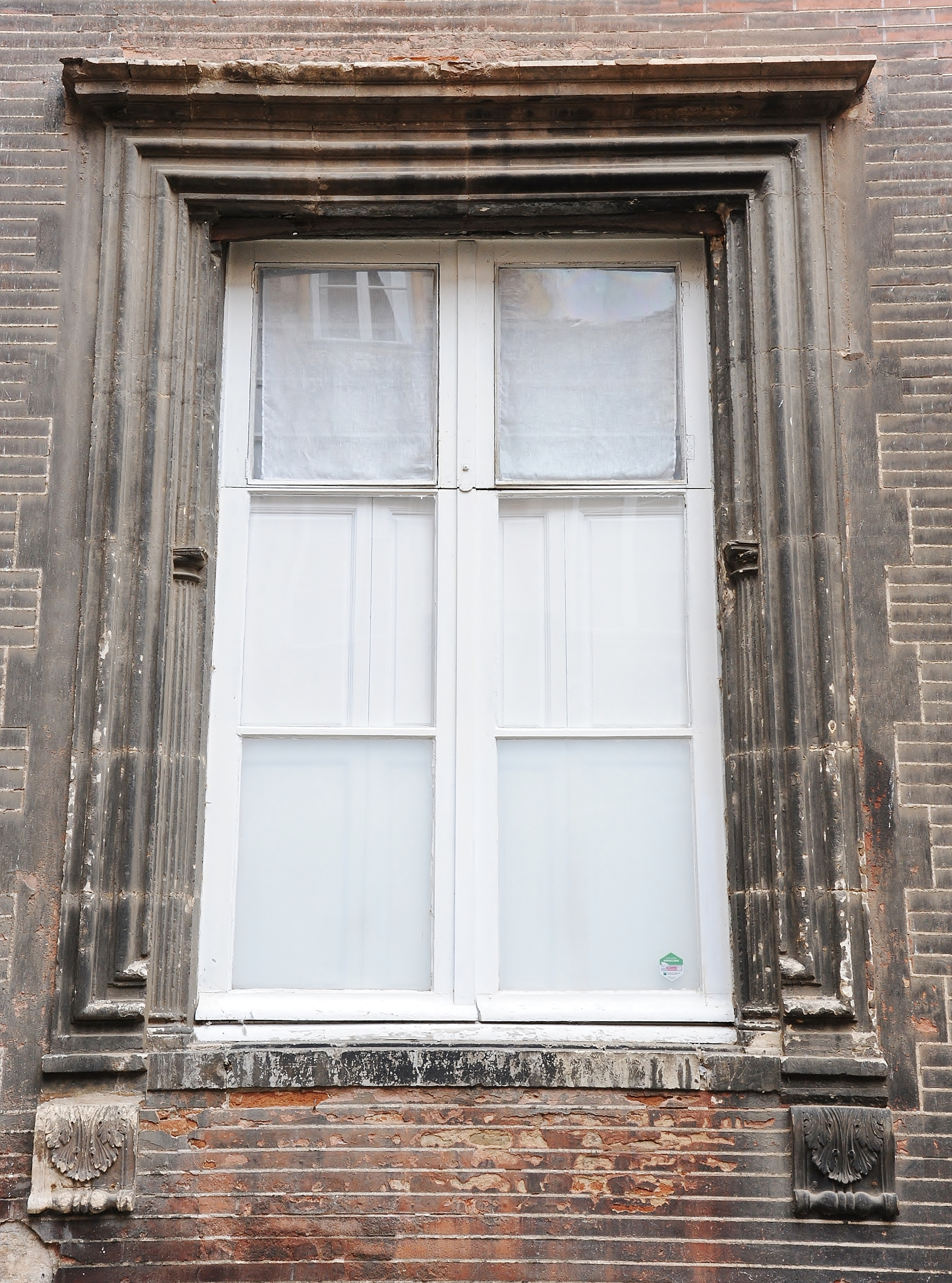

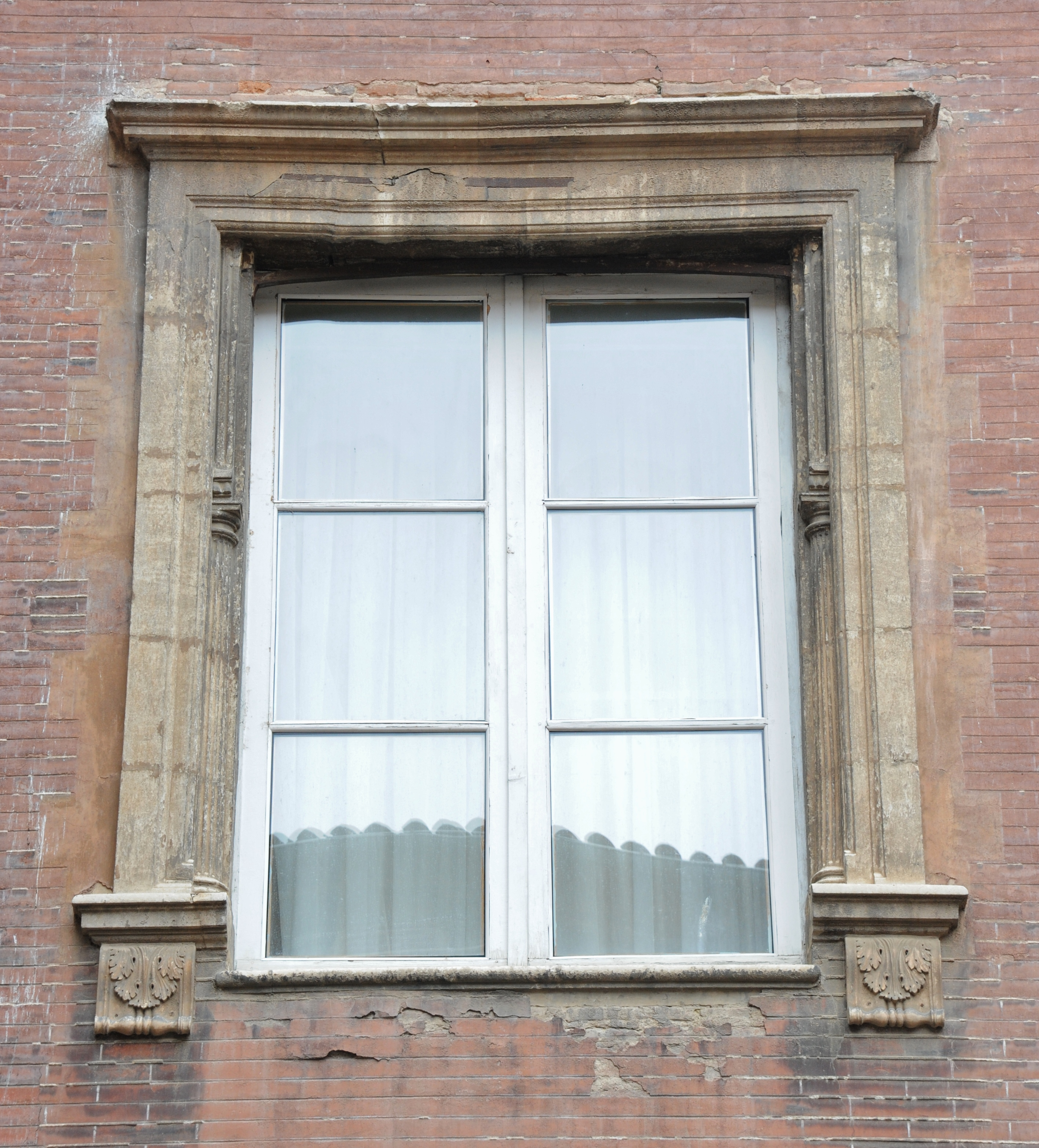

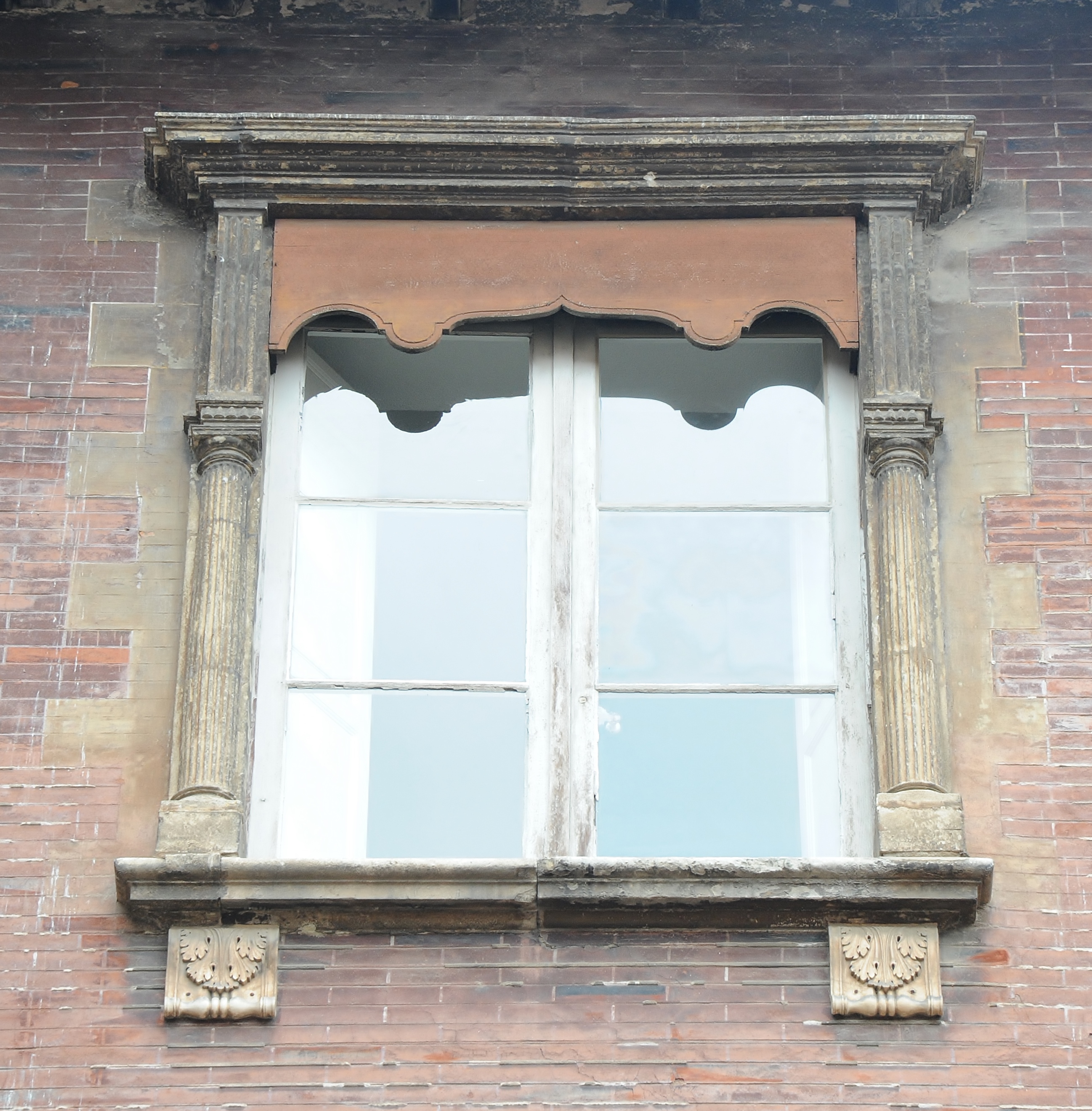

The courtyard: Second campaign of works (Clary, 1609-1616)

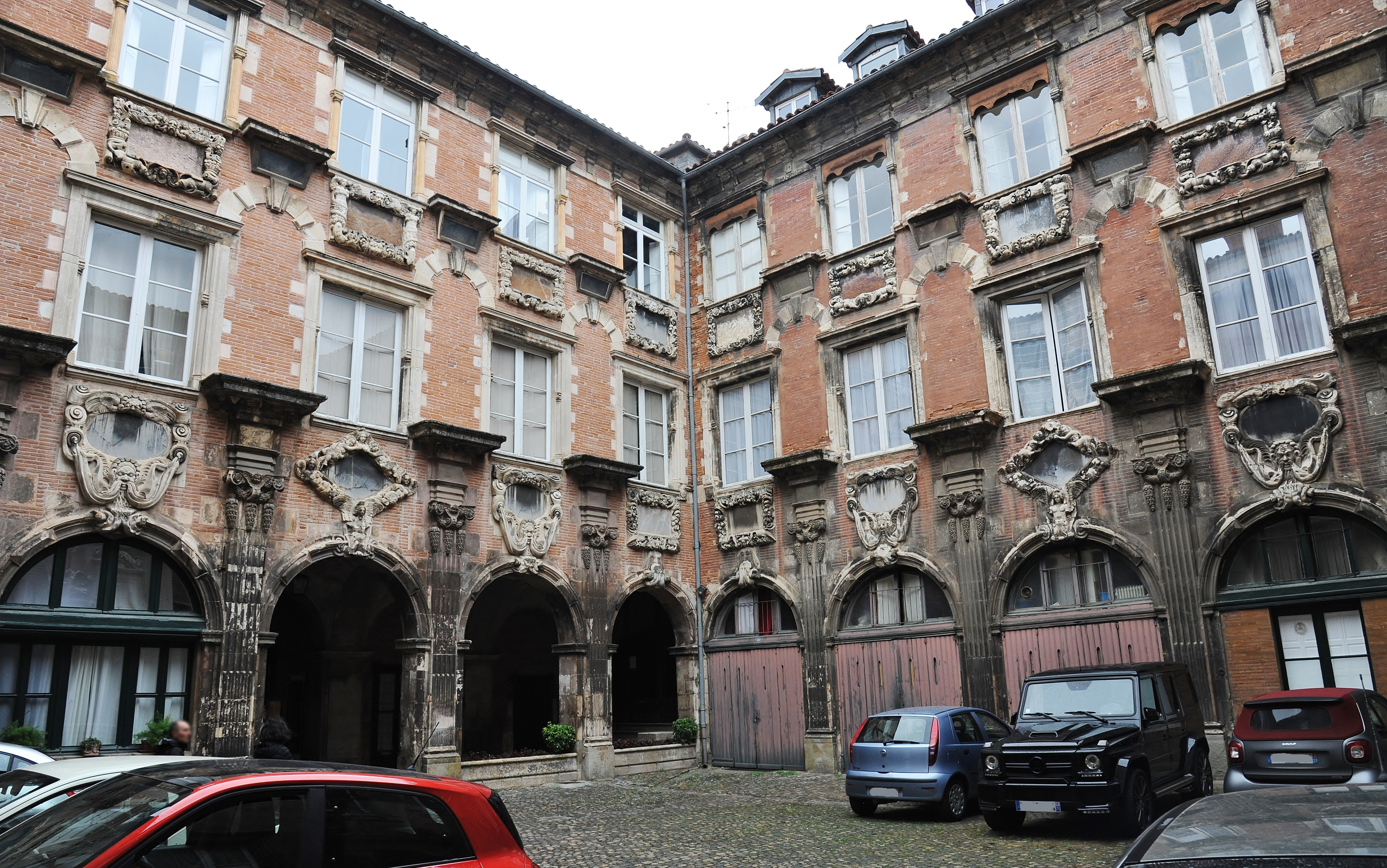

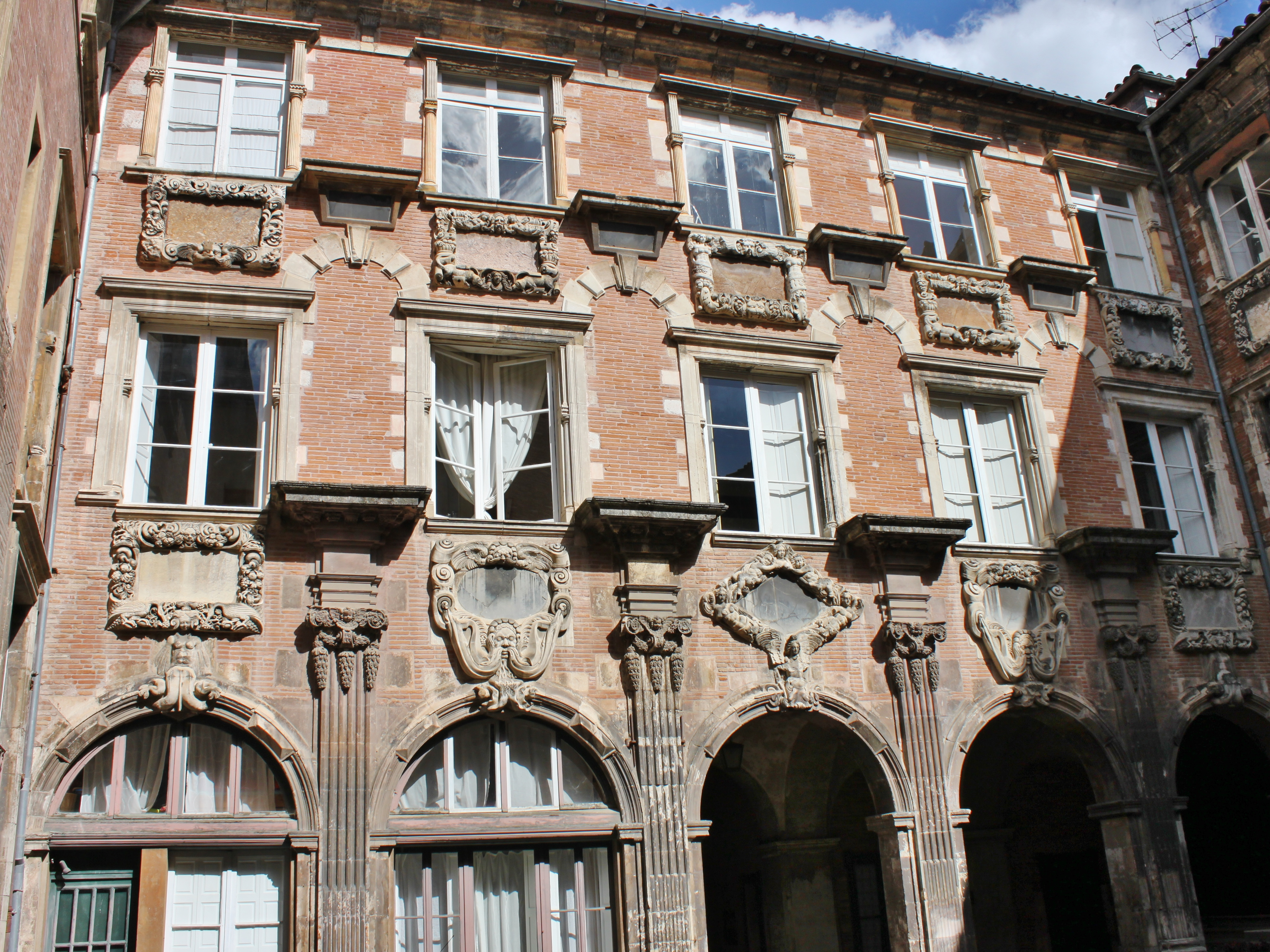

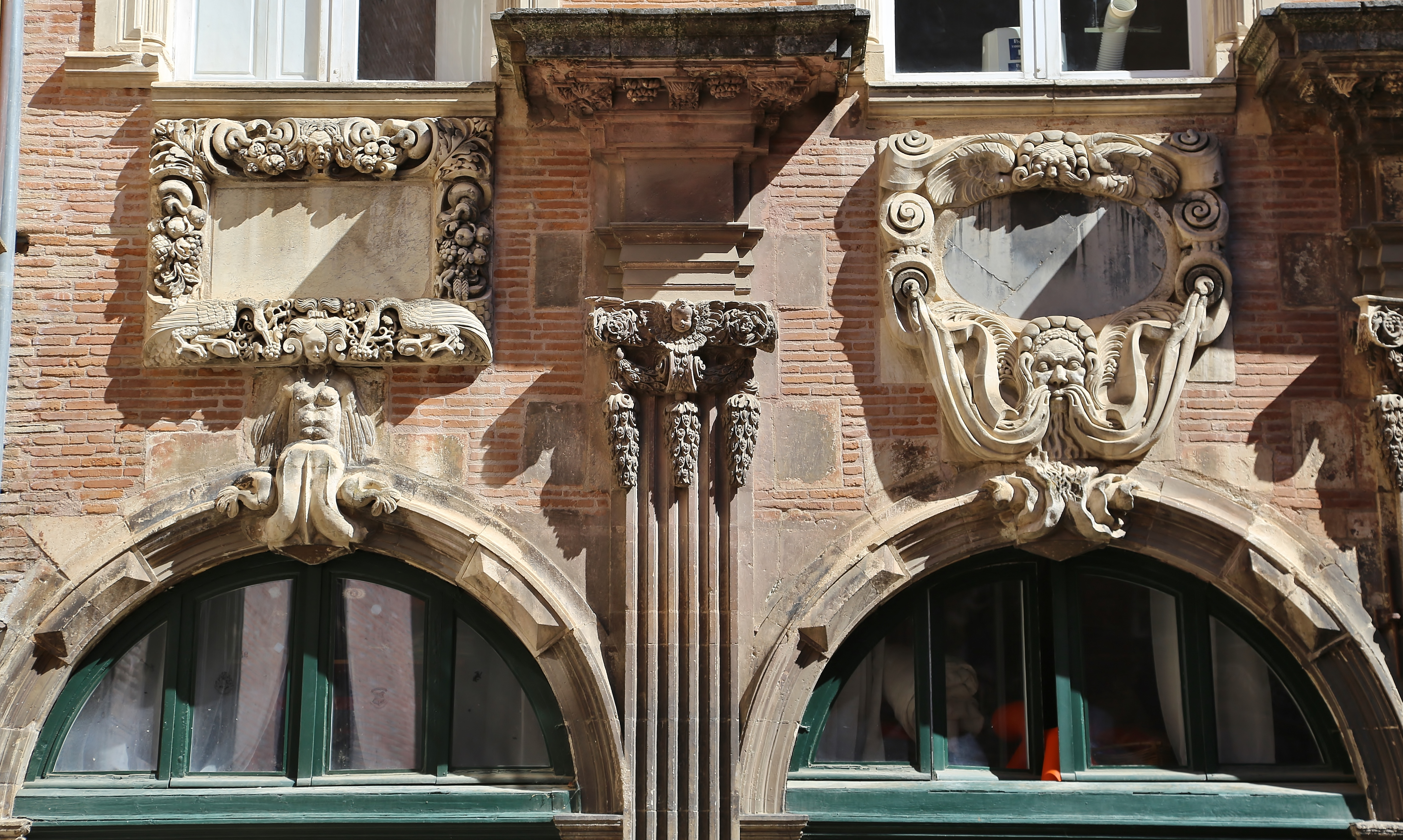

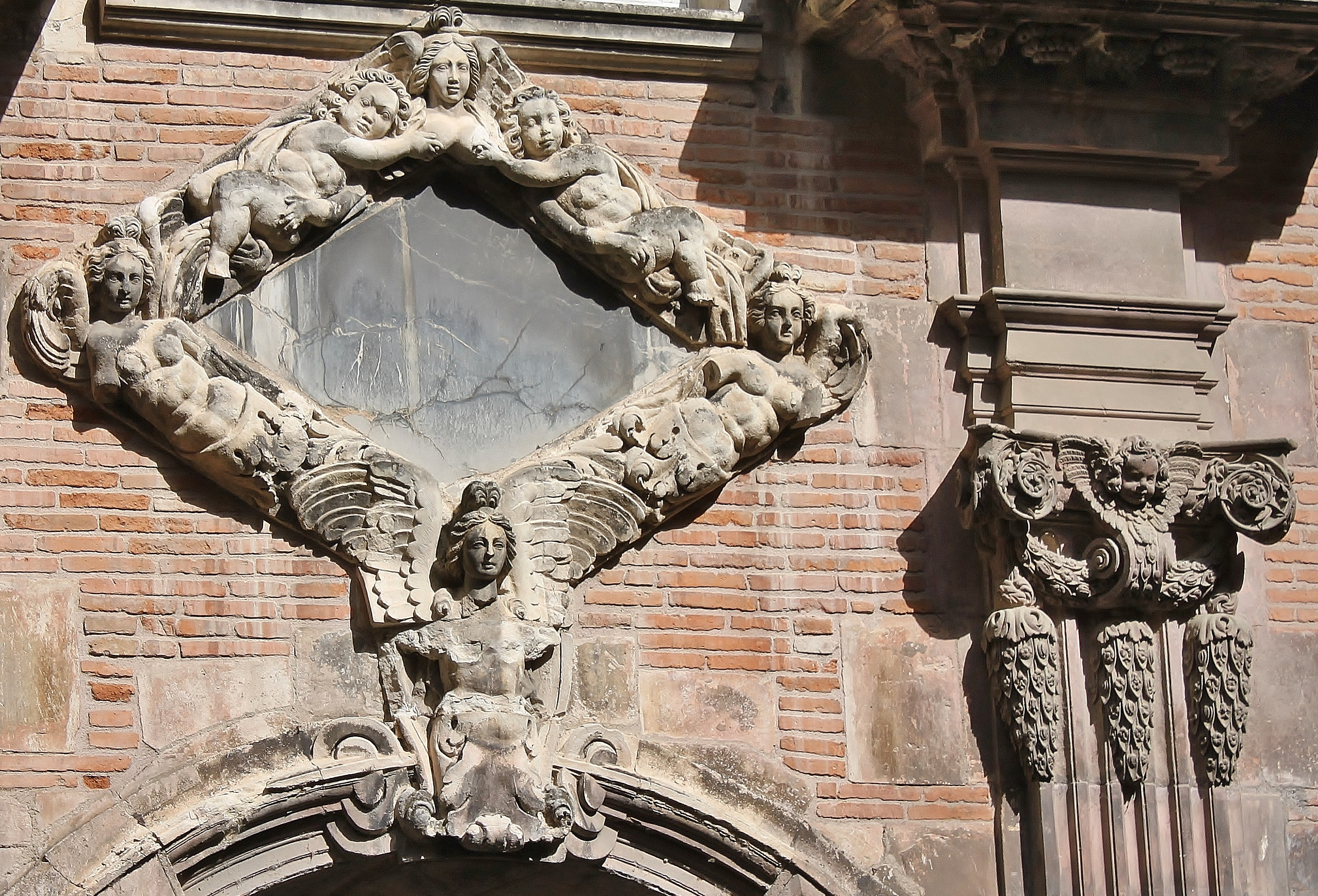

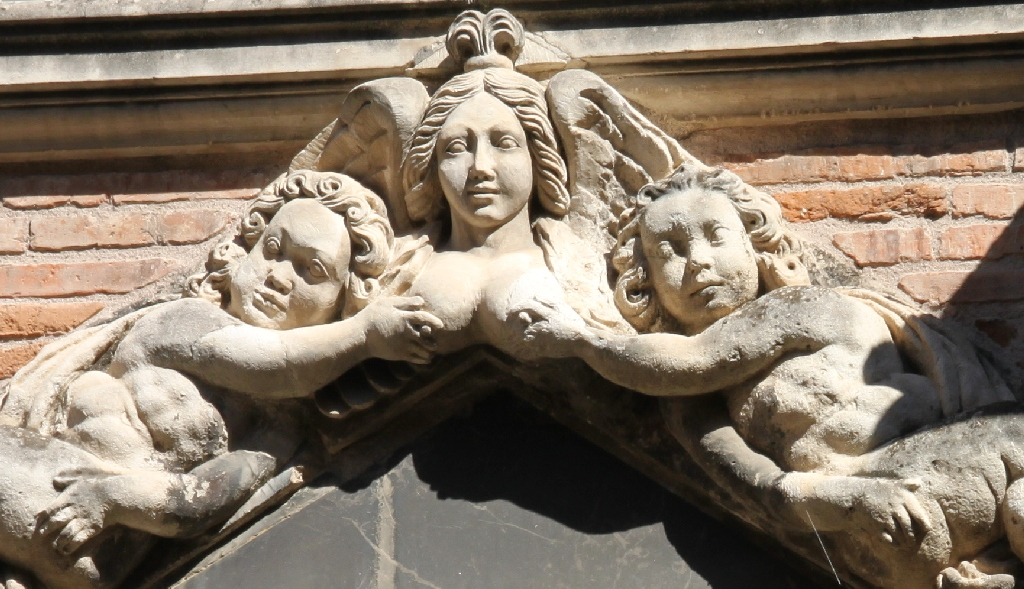

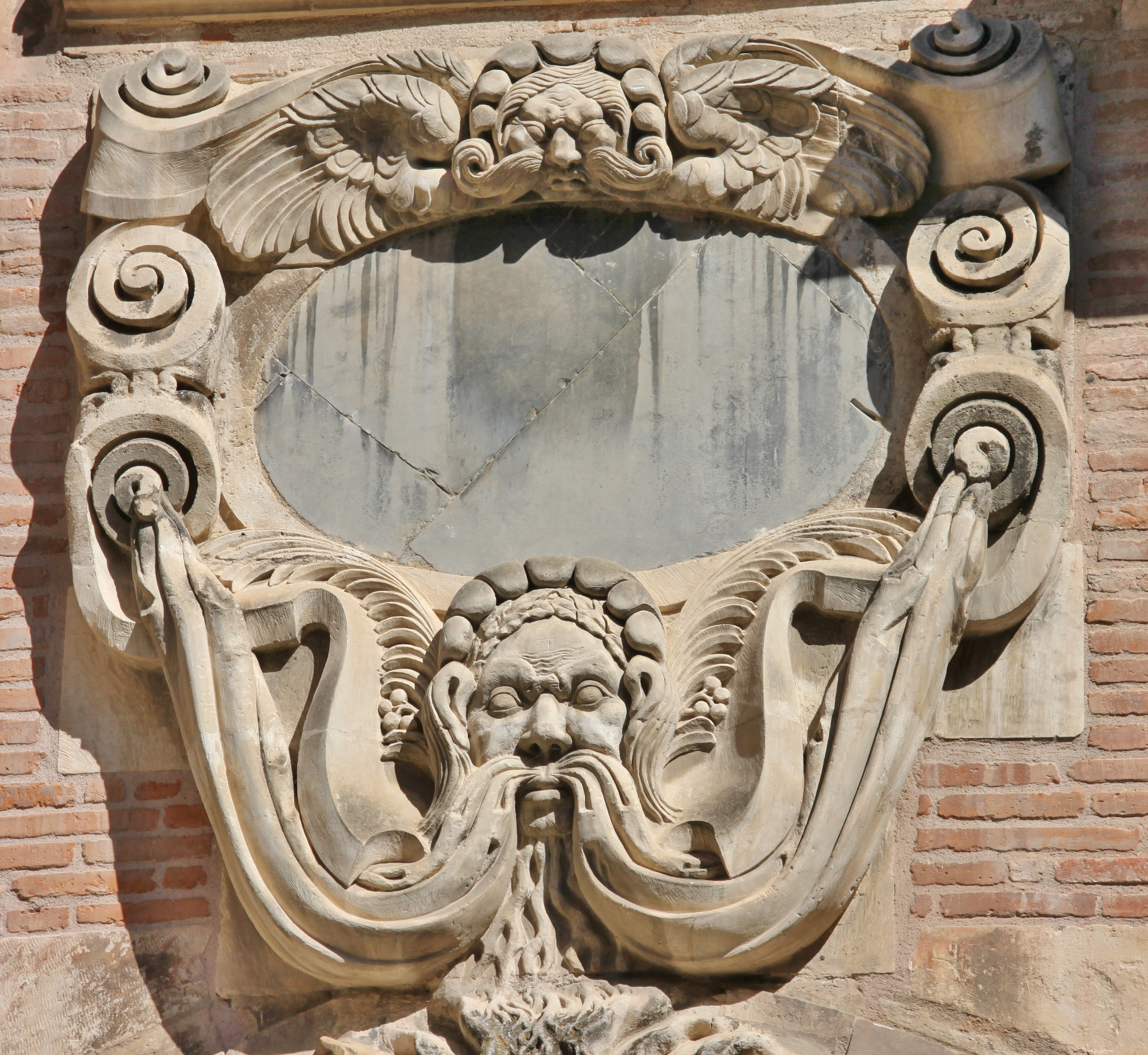

=== The door of the Atlanteans ===
Historians are still debating the age of this emblematic portal of the Toulouse Renaissance: dated 1538 and attributed to Nicolas Bachelier for some, from the beginning of the 17th century and from the workshop of Pierre Souffron for others, a more recent publication now suggests the decade 1550 and a resemblance with engravings of the fireplaces of the Château de Madrid (destroyed).

The door opens on a staircase with a straight ramp (1538), one of the first examples of this type of staircase in Toulouseː the spiral staircases gradually disappear from Toulouse hotels, under the influence of Renaissance architecture.

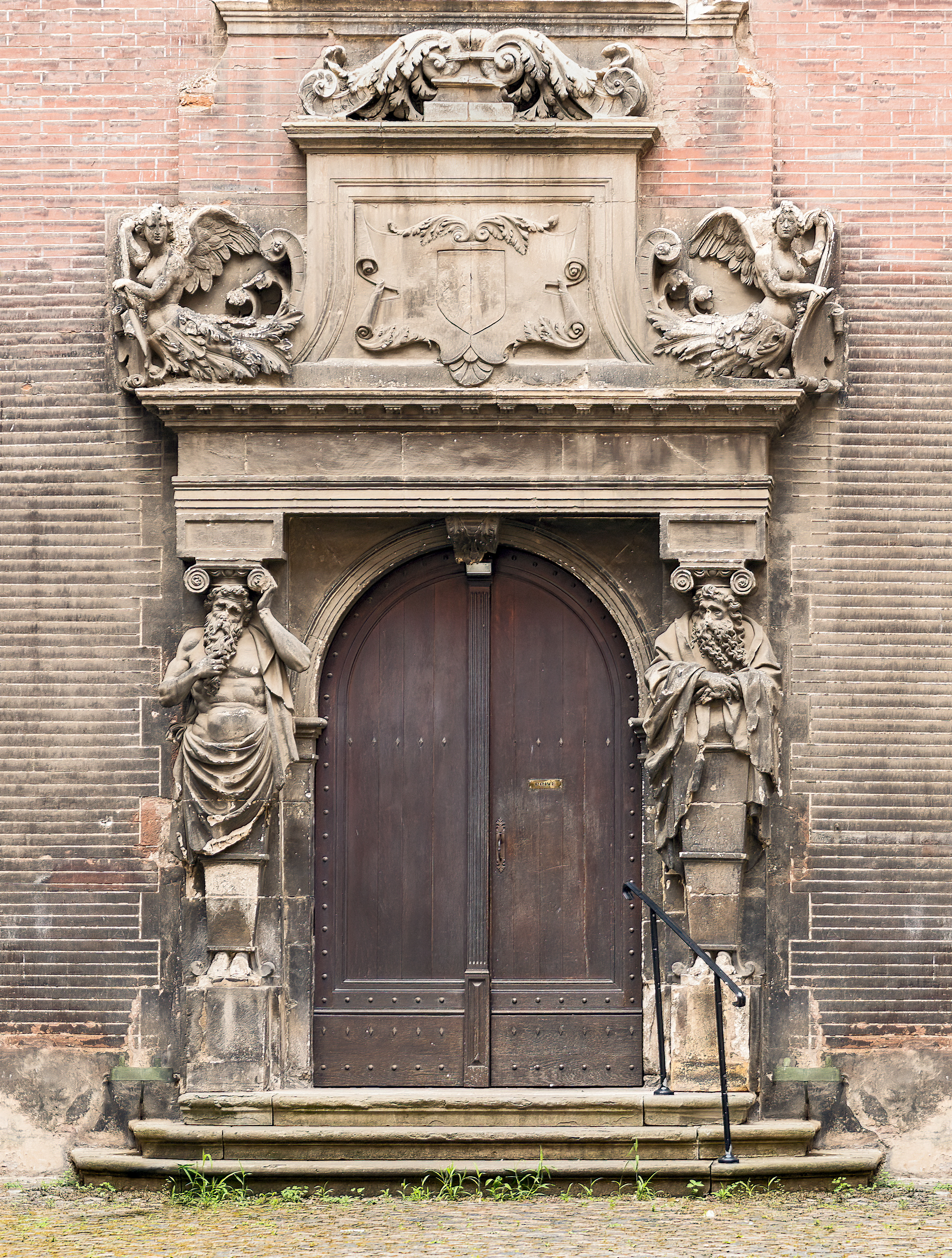

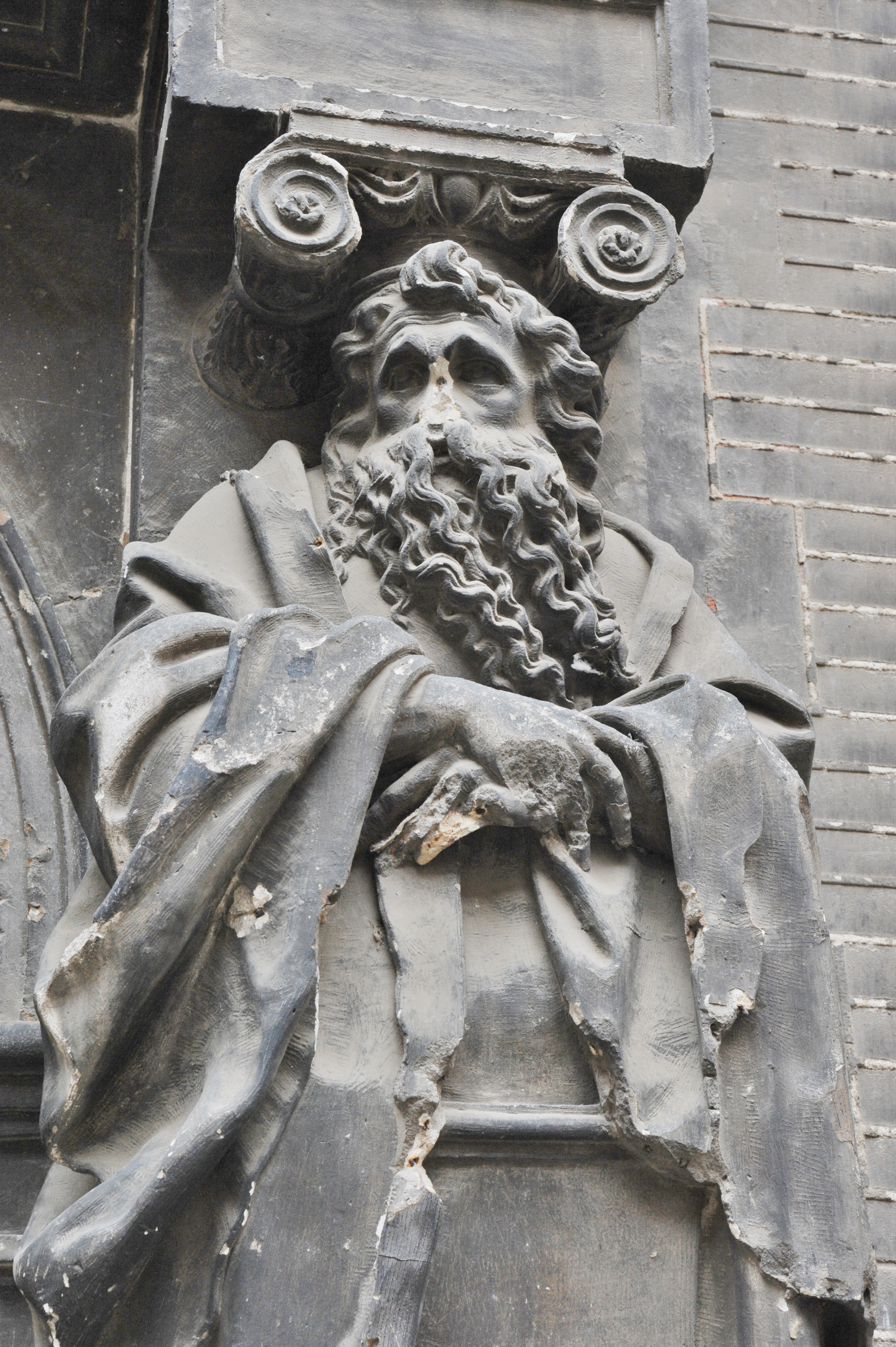

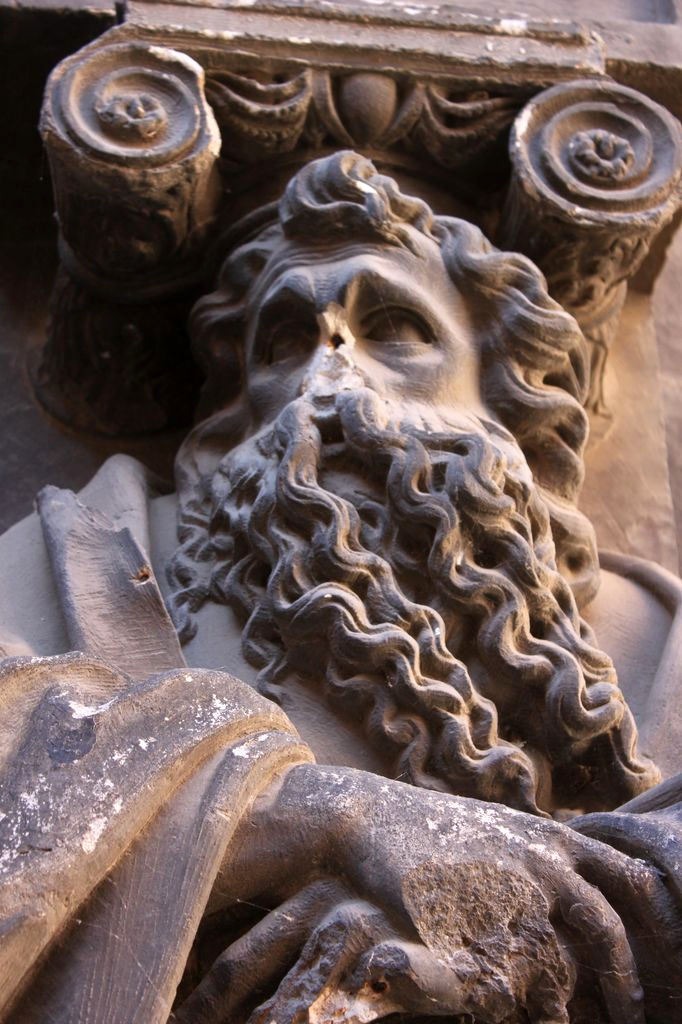

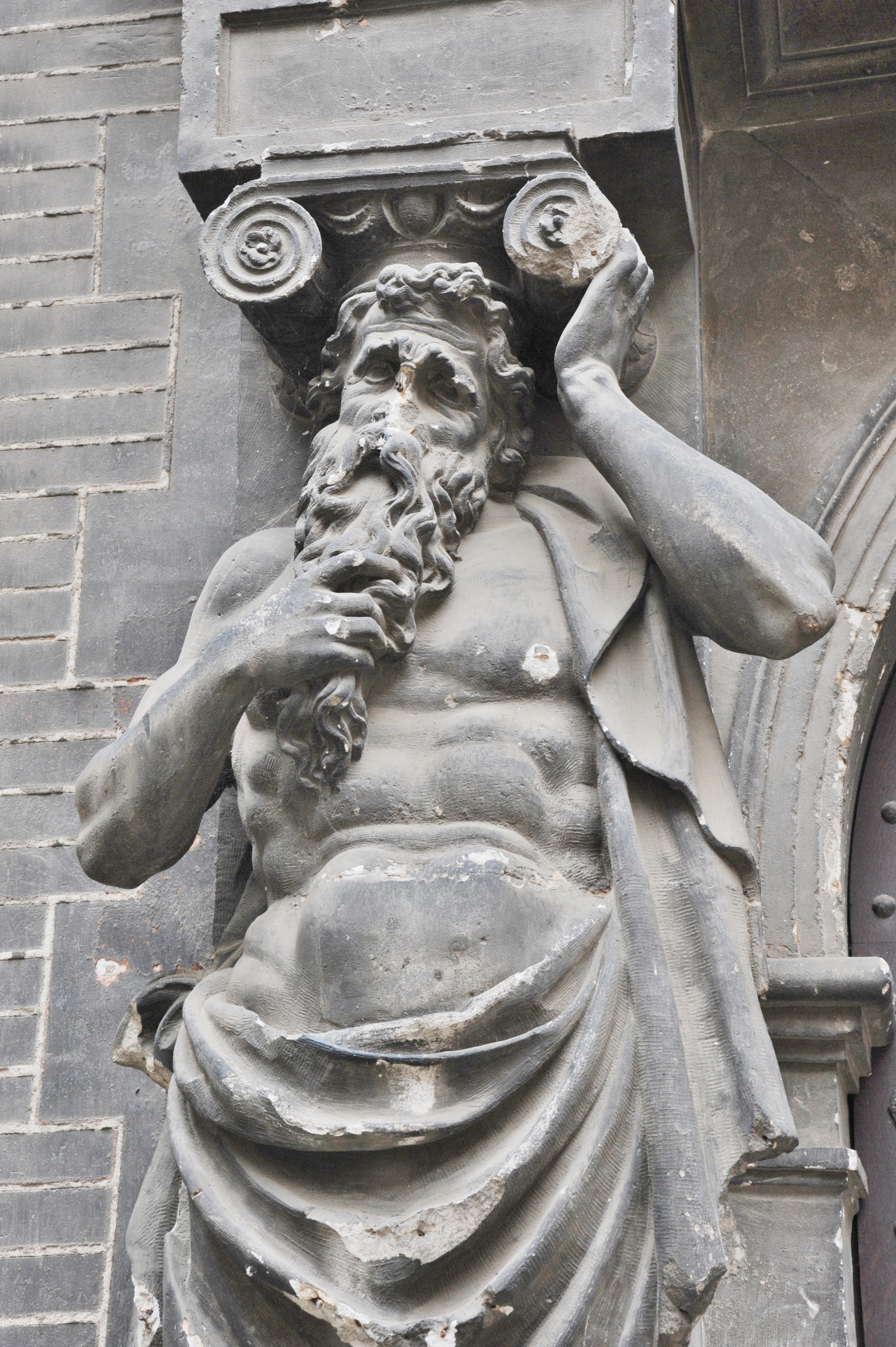

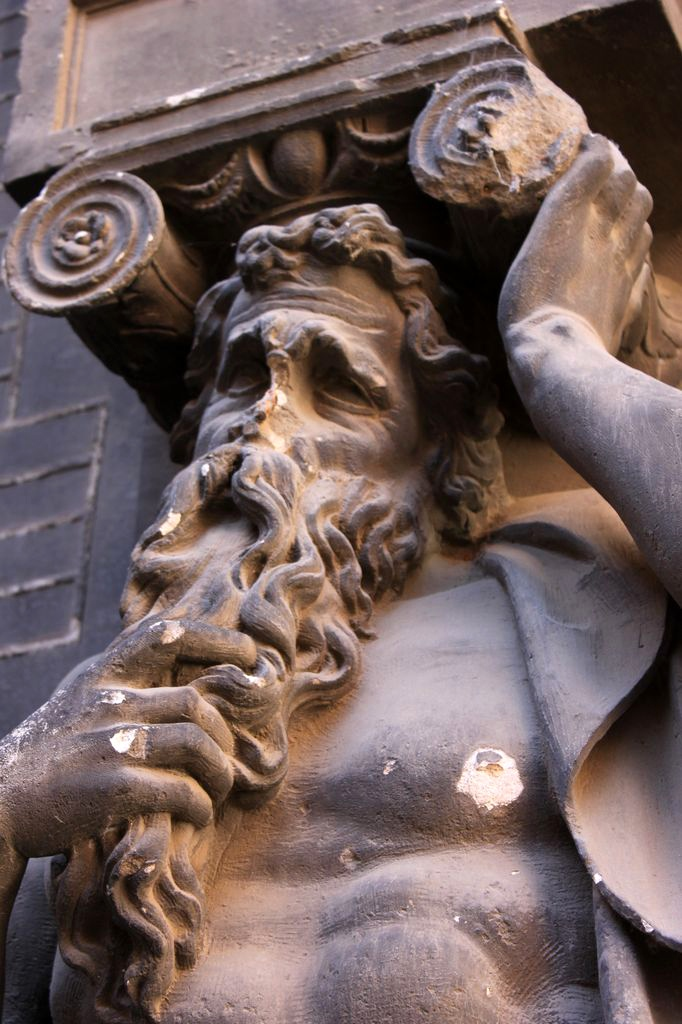

=== The interior ===
The interior of the hotel has painted ceilings and a monumental fireplace, designed by Nicolas Bachelier. The interior decor of the Gaston Virebent manufacture completes the interior decoration.

Its grand staircase is one of the first straight staircases of the Toulouse Renaissance, along with that of the Hôtel d'Ulmo.

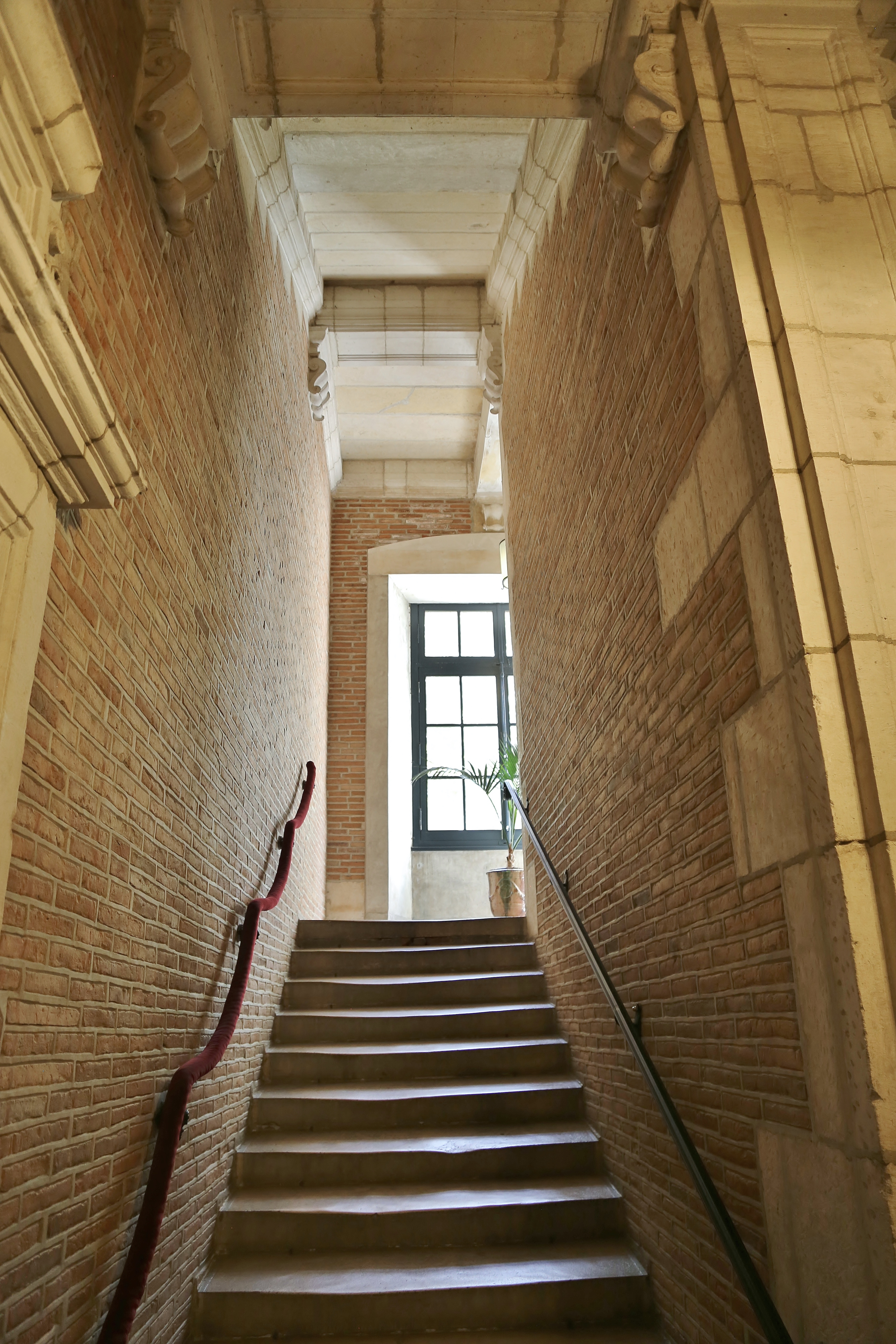
Straight staircase.

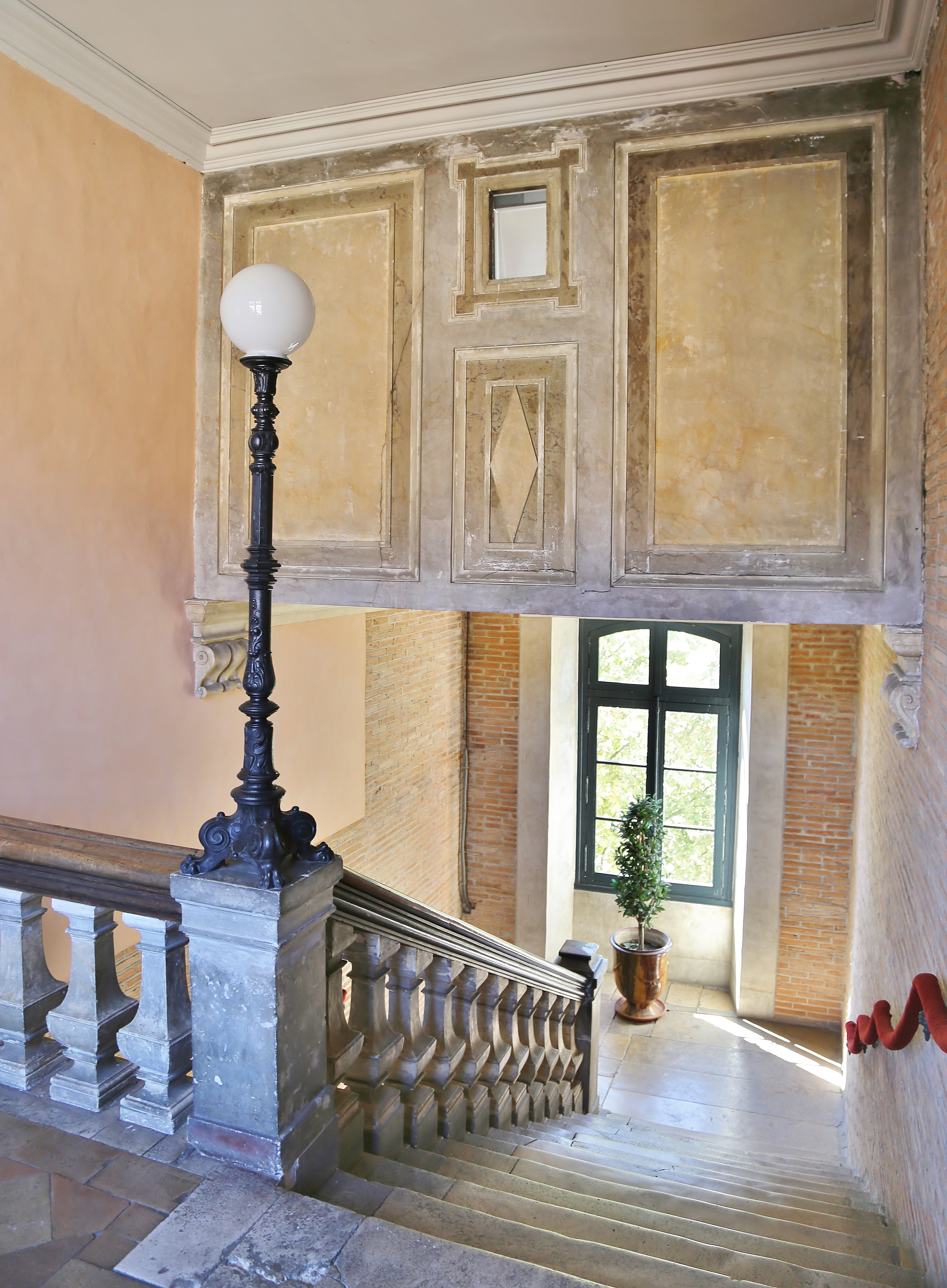
Top of the grand staircase.

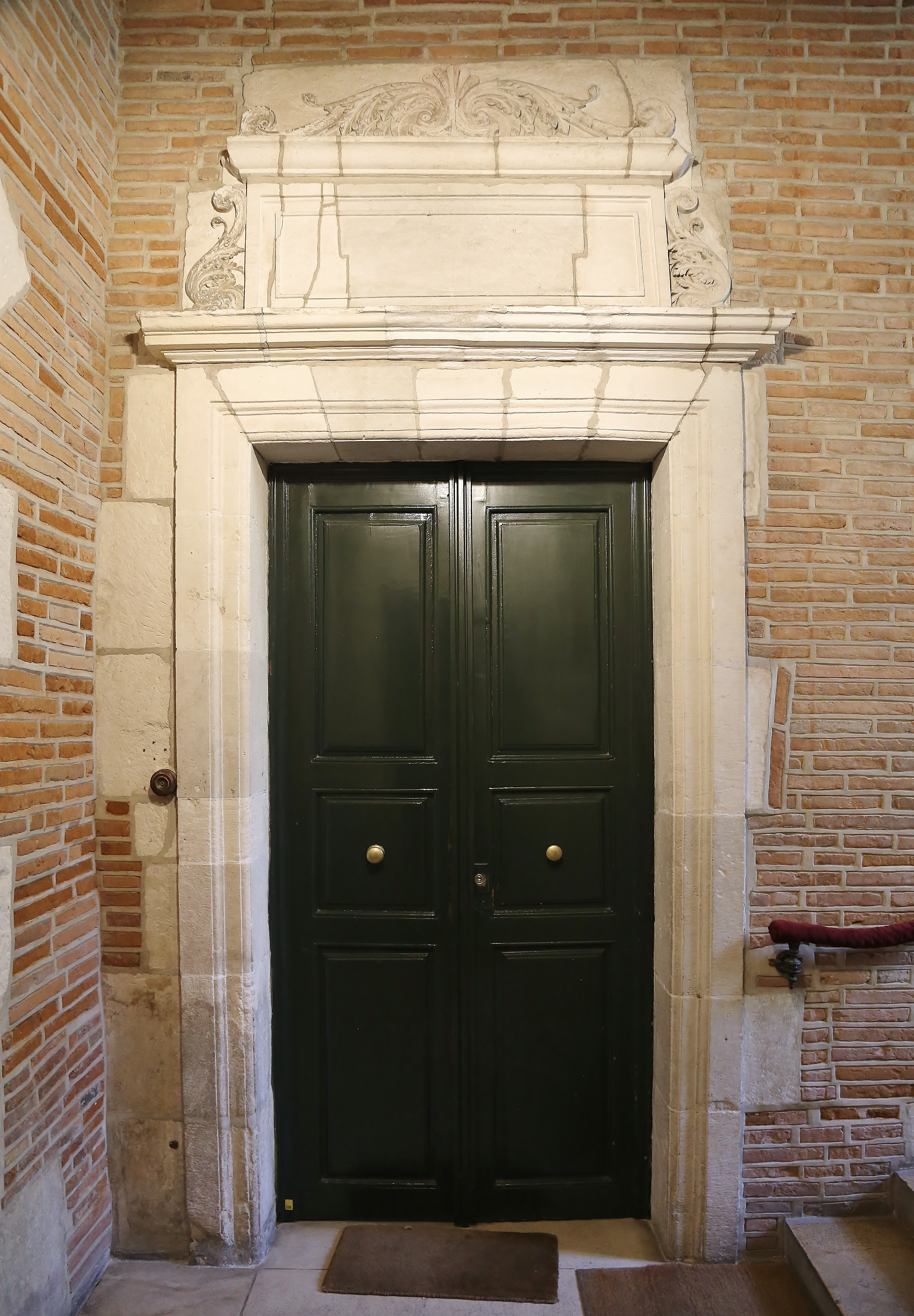
Renaissance interior door.

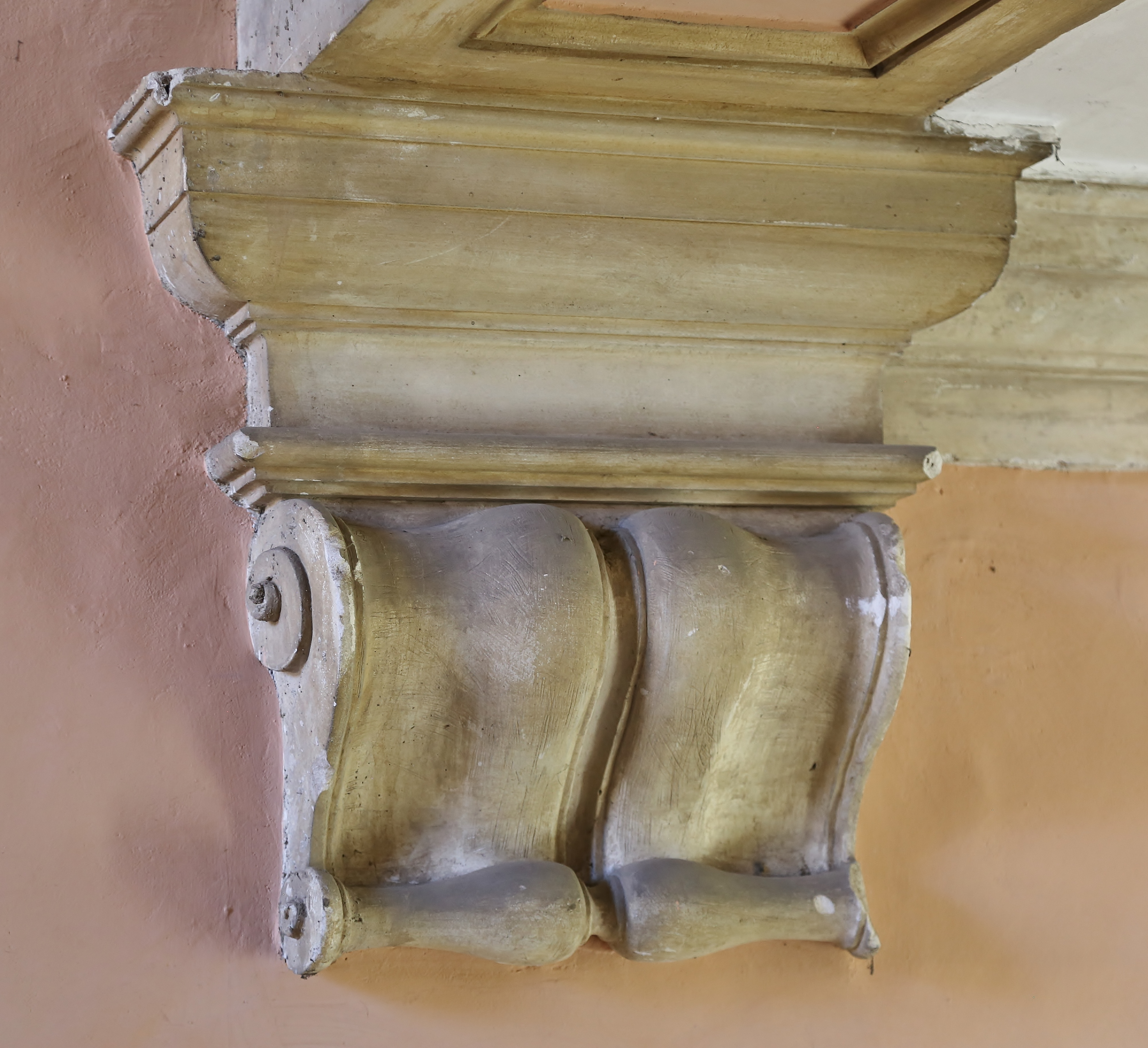
Doric capital in the staircase.

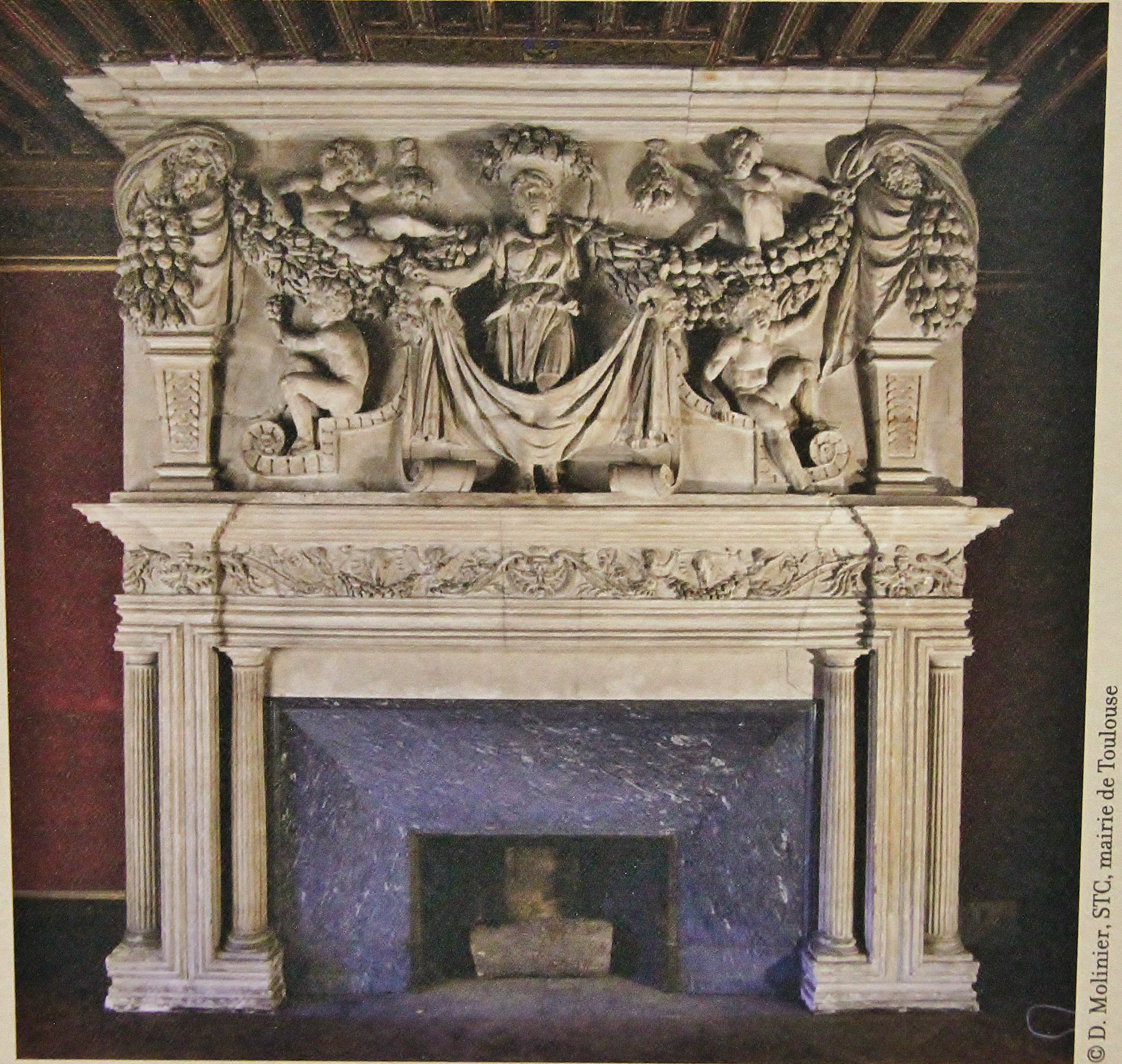
Monumental fireplace.

== See also ==
- Renaissance architecture of Toulouse

== Bibliography ==
- Jules Chalande, « Histoire des rues de Toulouse », Mémoires de l'Académie des Sciences et Belles-Lettres de Toulouse, 11e|série, tome II, Toulouse, 1914, p. 220-224.
- Michèle Éclache, Demeures toulousaines du s-|XVII : sources d'archives (1600-1630 environ), Université de Toulouse-Le Mirail, collection « Méridiennes », Toulouse, 2006 ISBN 978-2-912025-29-6
- Christian and Jean-Michel Lassure and Gérard Villeval, Fouilles de l'Hôtel de Clary (dit Hôtel de pierre) à Toulouse (Haute-Garonne). Découverte de trois fosses à poterie, rapport de fouilles, 1964.
- Bruno Tollon, « Hôtels de Toulouse », Congrès archéologique de France. 154e session. Monuments en Toulousain et Comminges. 1996, Société française d'archéologie, Paris, 2002, p. 303-310 ISBN 978-2369190950
