= Hôtel de Brucelles =

Coordinates: 43.6008°N 1.4437°E

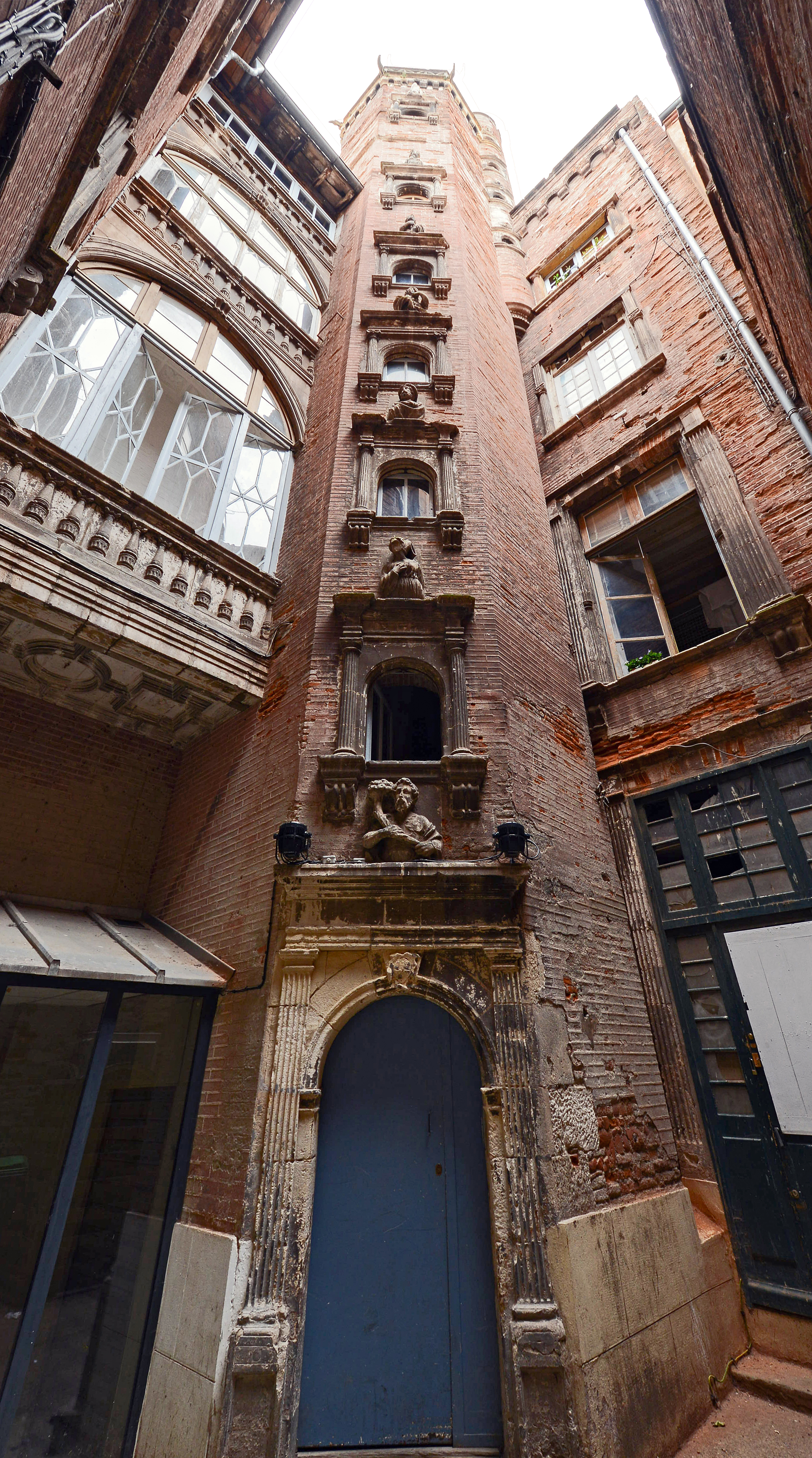
The courtyard and tower of the Hôtel de Brucelles.

The Hôtel de Brucelles in Toulouse, France, is a gothic and Renaissance hôtel particulier (palace) of the 16th century. It is a listed historical monument since 1925.

== History ==
The Hotel de Brucelles is located at 19 rue des Changes, in the historic center of Toulouse and was built circa 1544 for the capitoul Arnaud de Brucelles.

== Description ==
Situated at the heart of the merchant quarter, Hôtel de Brucelles was built in 1544 by the cloth merchant Arnaud de Brucelles (elected capitoul in 1534-1535) on a very small plot overlooking Rue des Changes. Restricted by the dimensions of the site, he expressed his ambitions upwards by building a very high polygonal staircase tower and a brick turret, both adorned with stone sculptures. Entry to the site was gained through the tower, the latter giving access to the house at the back of the courtyard and, through three superimposed galleries, the building on the street.

To augment the luxury of his home, Arnaud de Brucelles commissioned several stone windows, each featuring small columns, in accordance with the new fashion instigated in Toulouse by one of its most prominent citizens, Jean de Bagis. The spaces above the entrance to the staircase tower and each of the six windows feature the sculpted bust of a man or woman dressed in classical attire (breastplate, toga) or the fashion of the sixteenth century. For the owner, choosing mythological or allegorical figures was a good way to express their virtue and social success. The capitals of the columns surrounding each window take up the superposition of classical architectural orders: Doric, Ionic, Corinthian. To the left of the tower, the balusters adorning the superimposed galleries (not originally walled) are also Corinthian, Ionic and Doric.

== Pictures ==
Hôtel de Brucelles

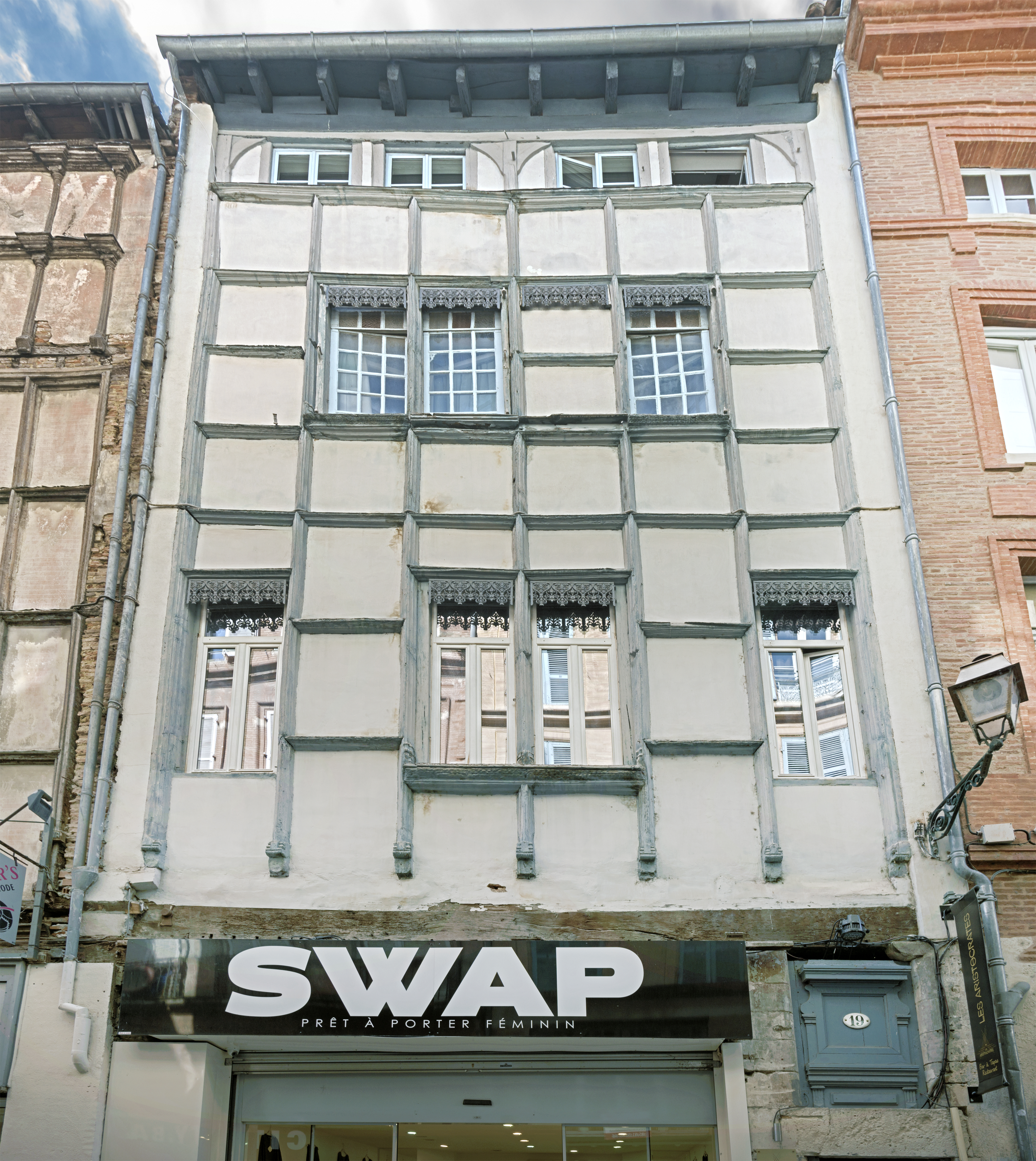

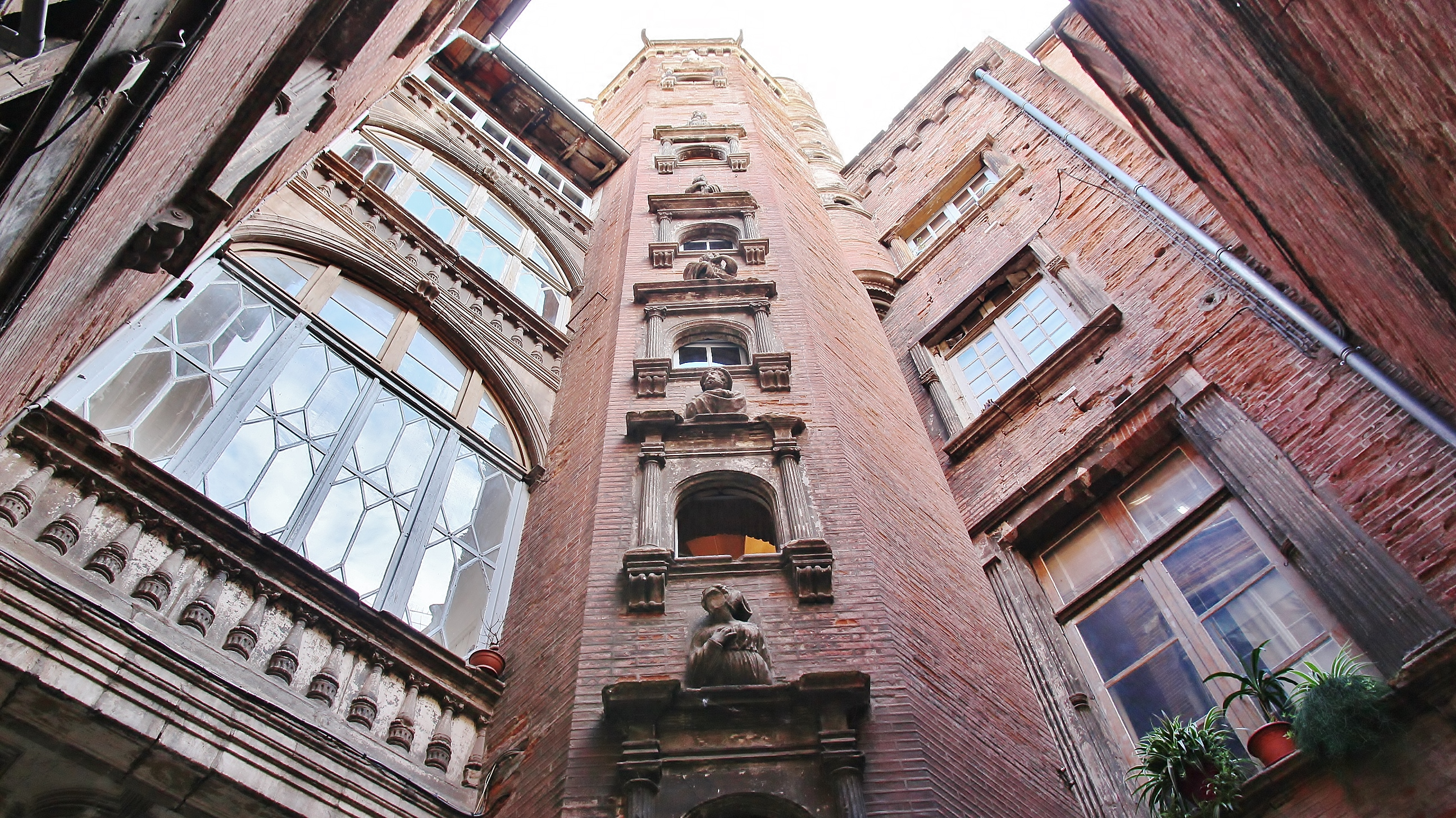

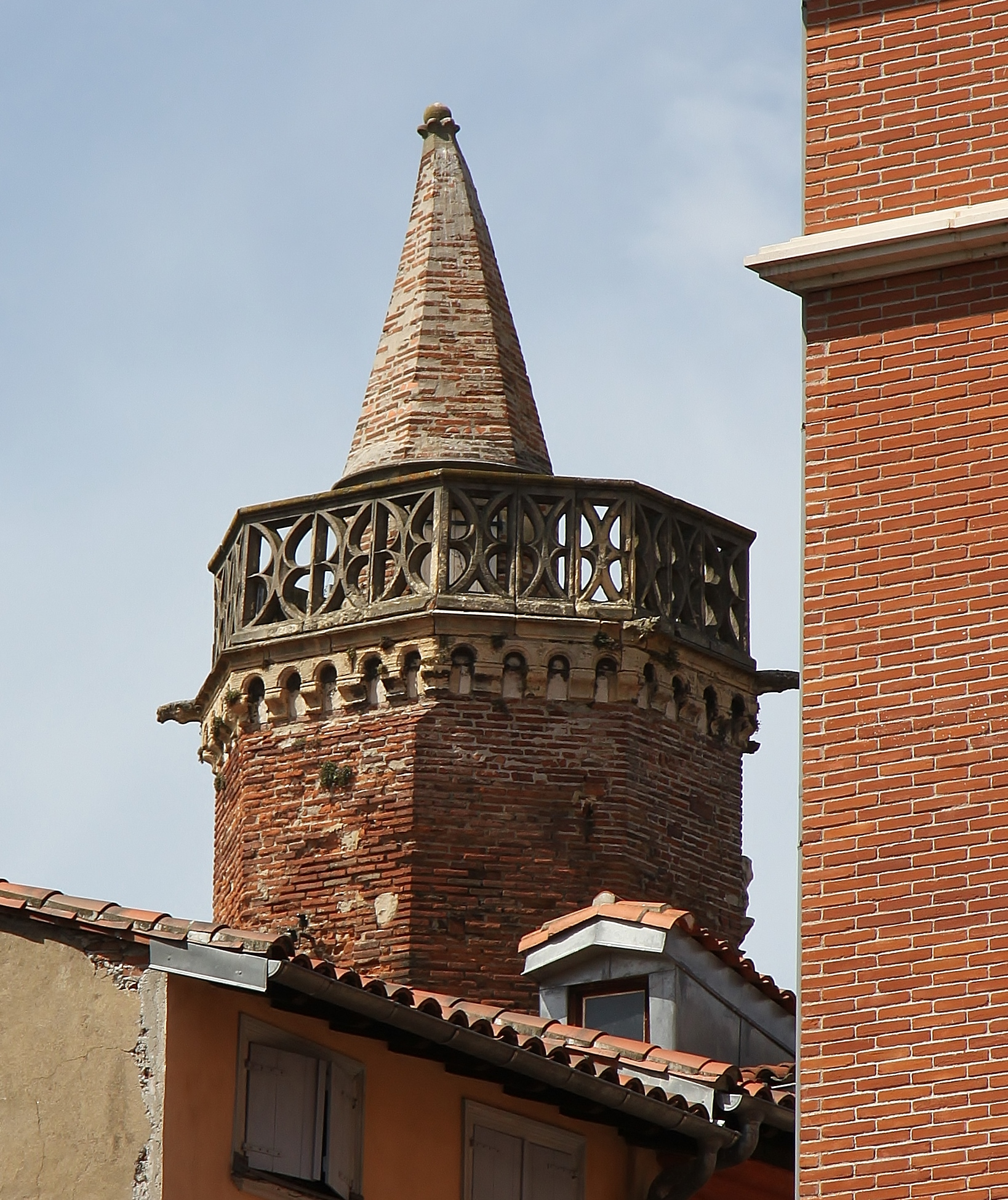

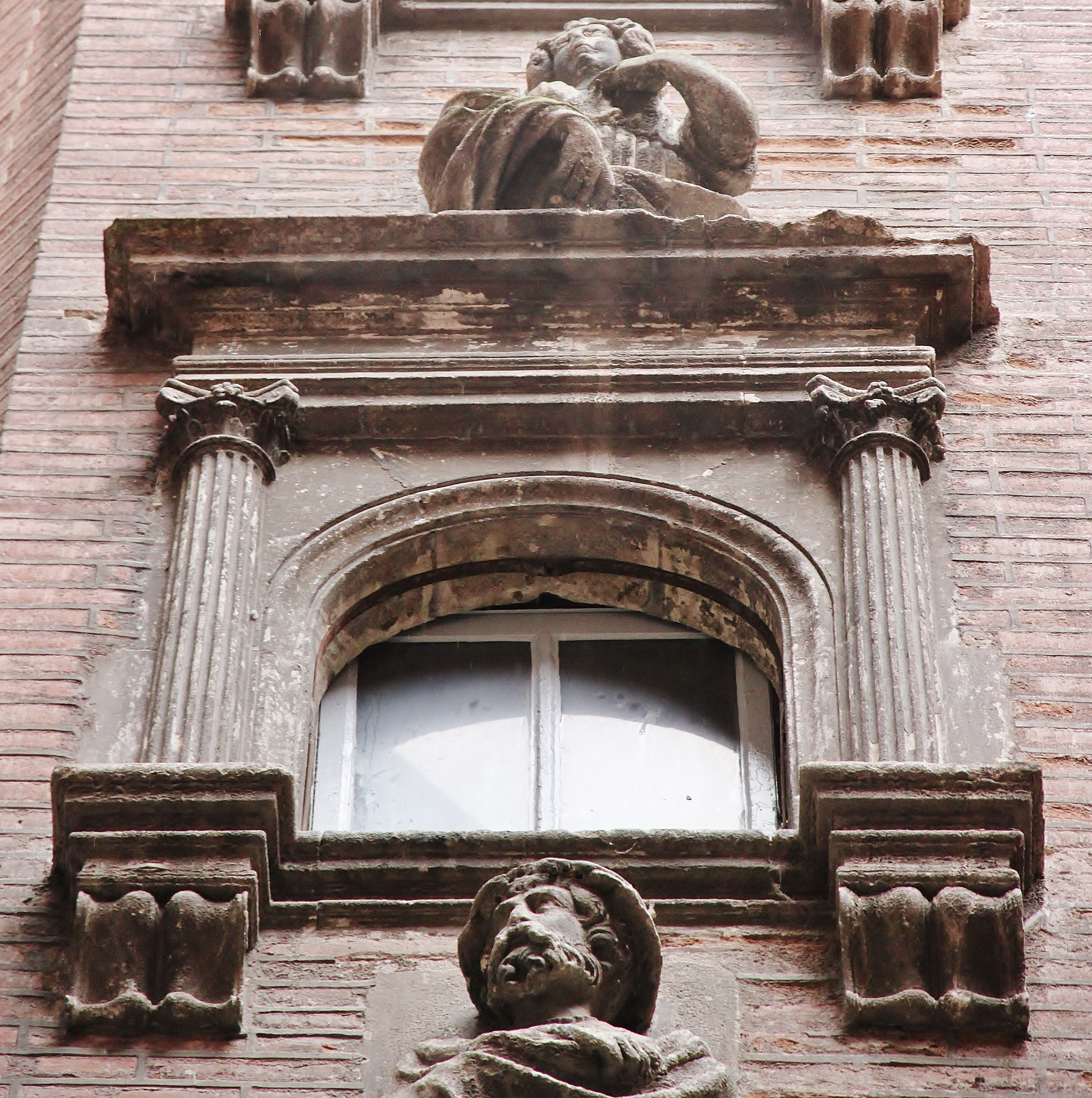

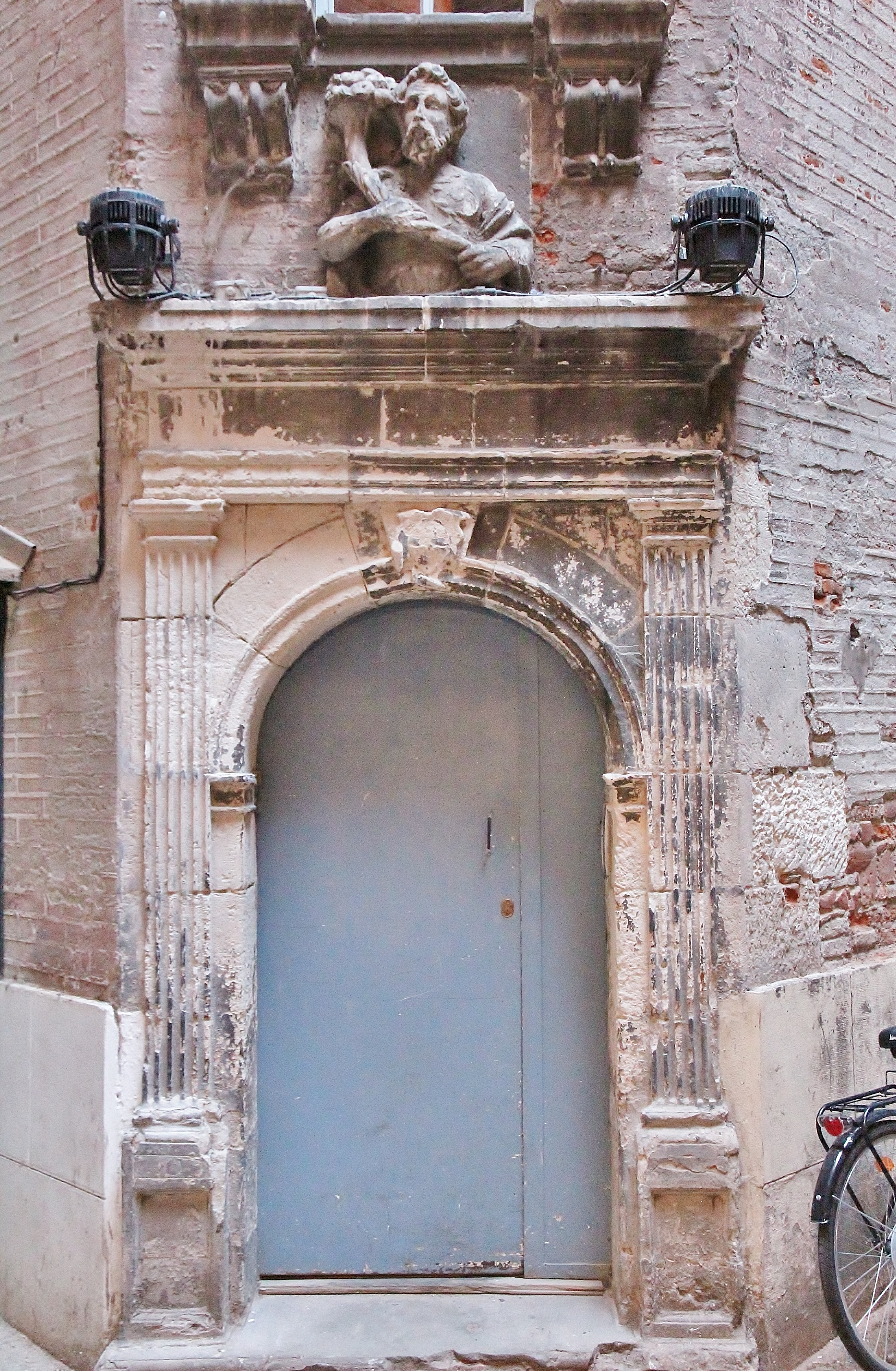

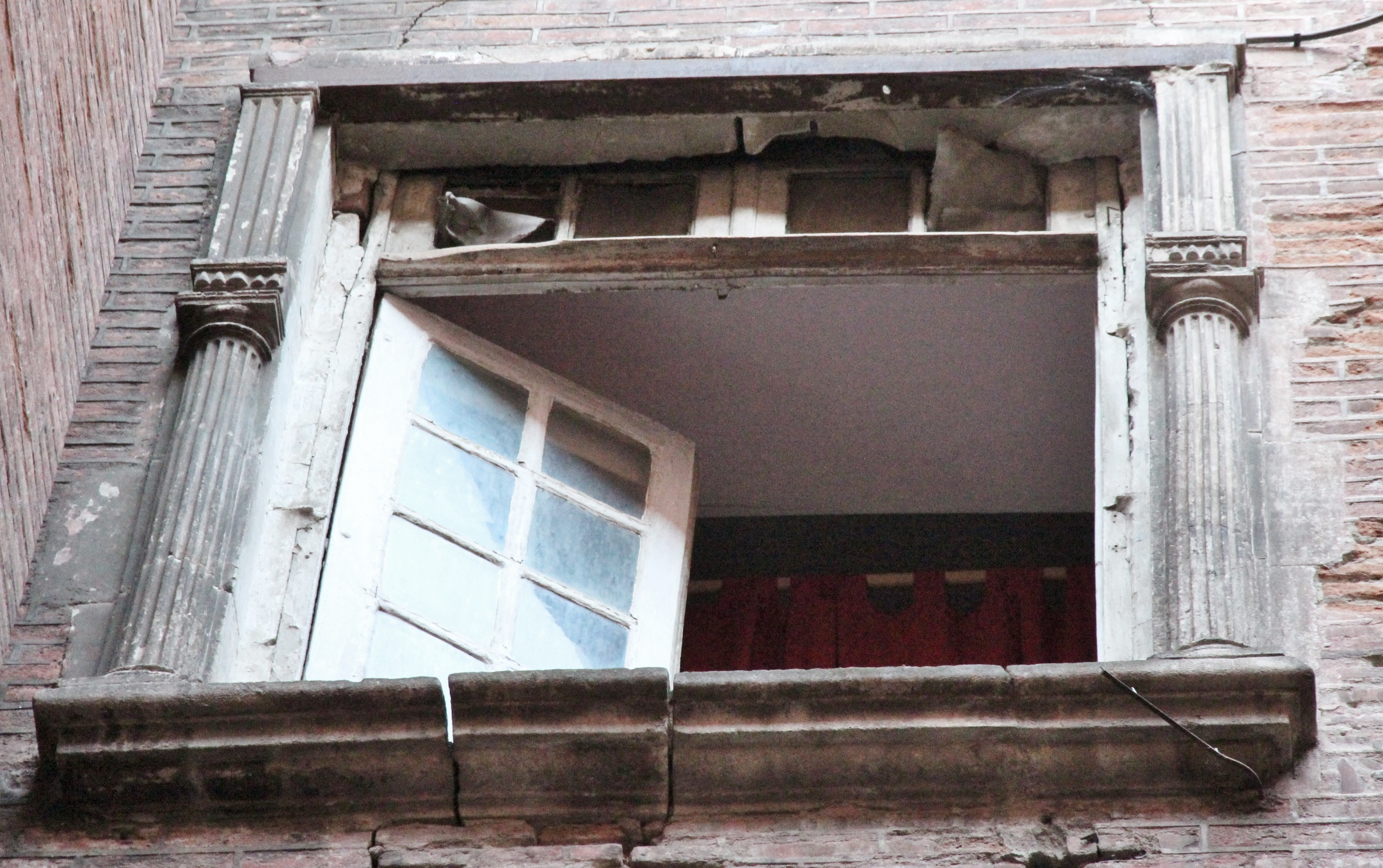

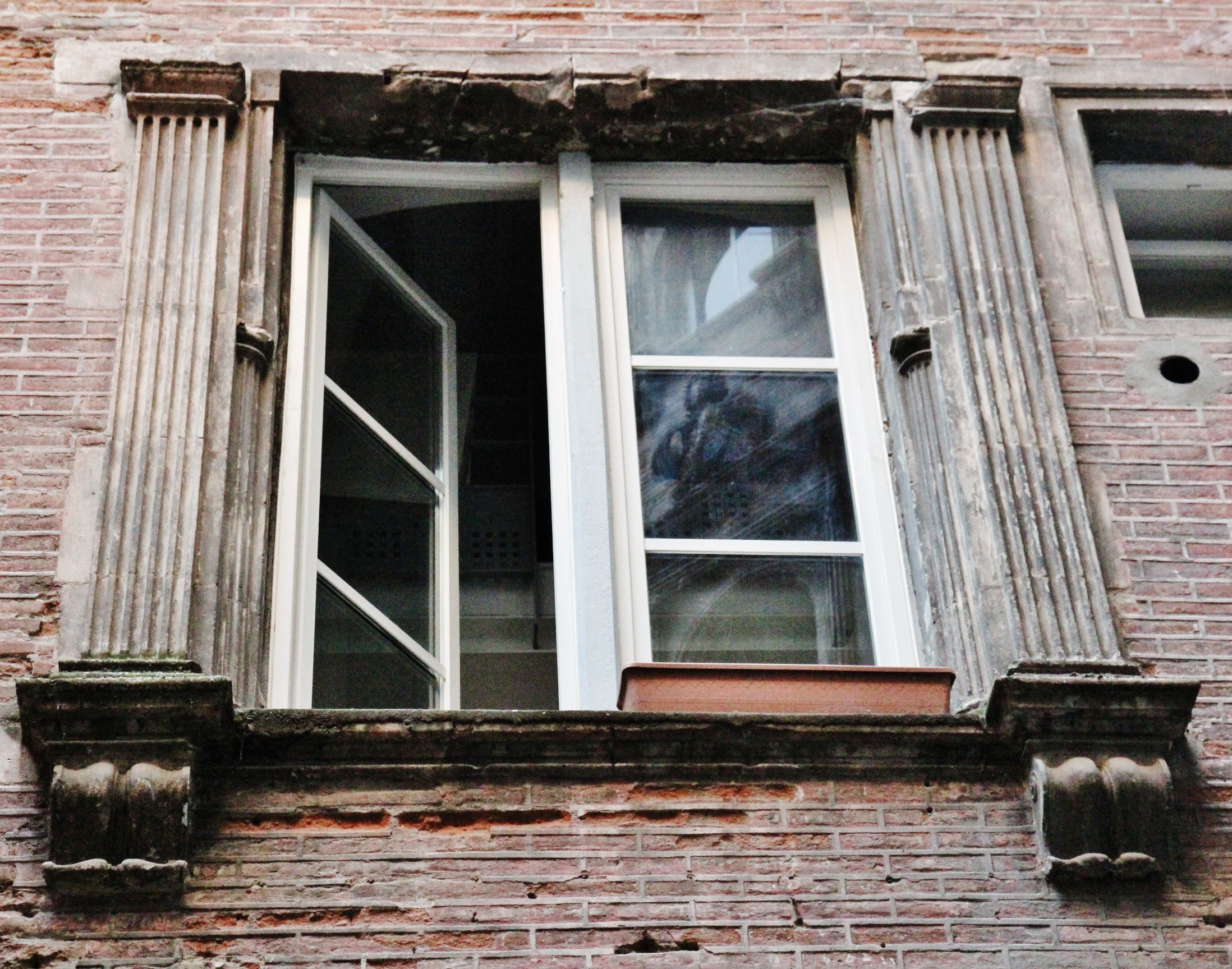

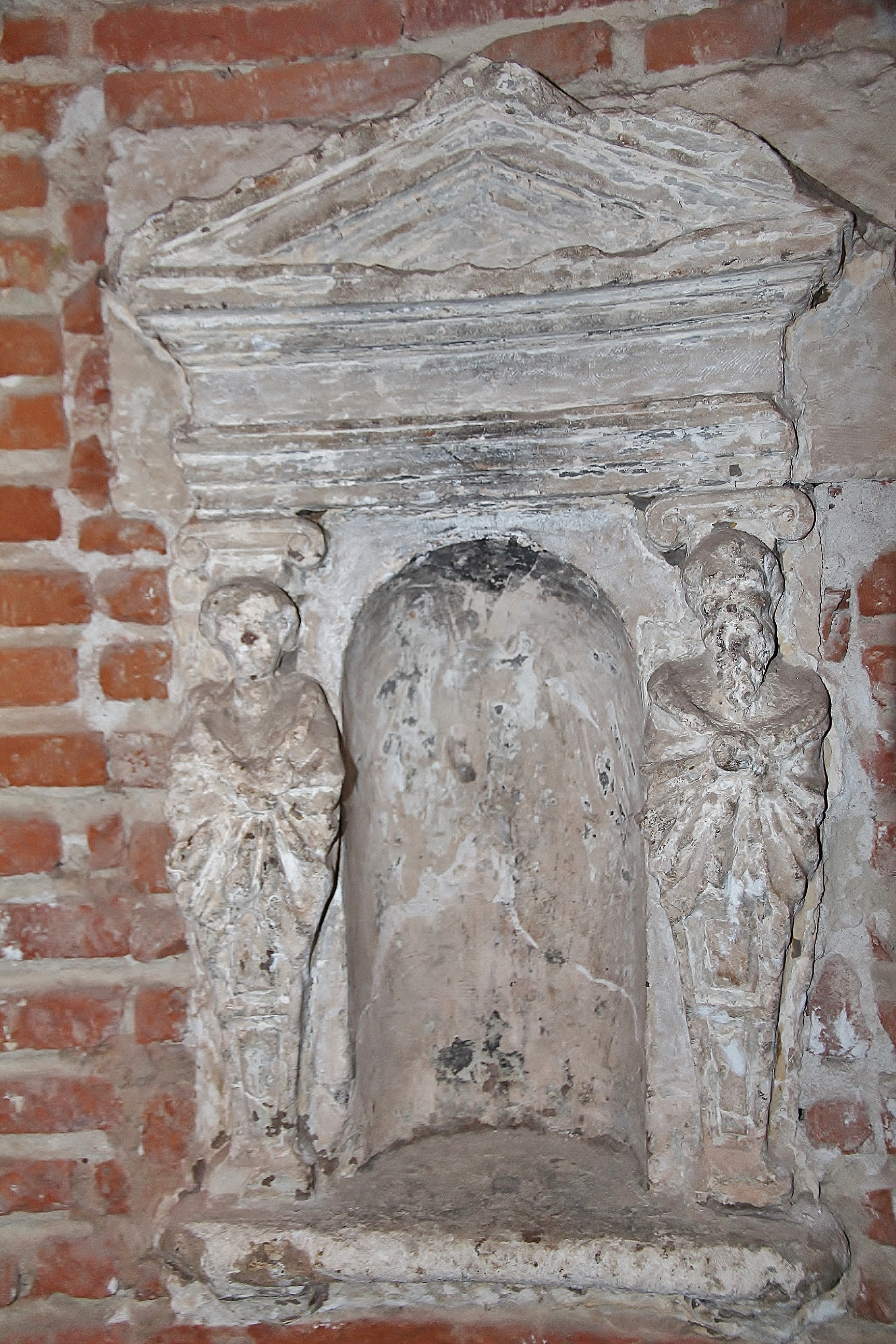

== See also ==
- Renaissance architecture of Toulouse

== Bibliography ==
- Guy Ahlsell de Toulza, Louis Peyrusse, Bruno Tollon, Hôtels et Demeures de Toulouse et du Midi Toulousain, Daniel Briand éditeur, Drémil Lafage, 1997
