= Hôtel de La Mamye =

16th century hôtel particulier (palace)

Coordinates: 43.5974°N 1.4420°E

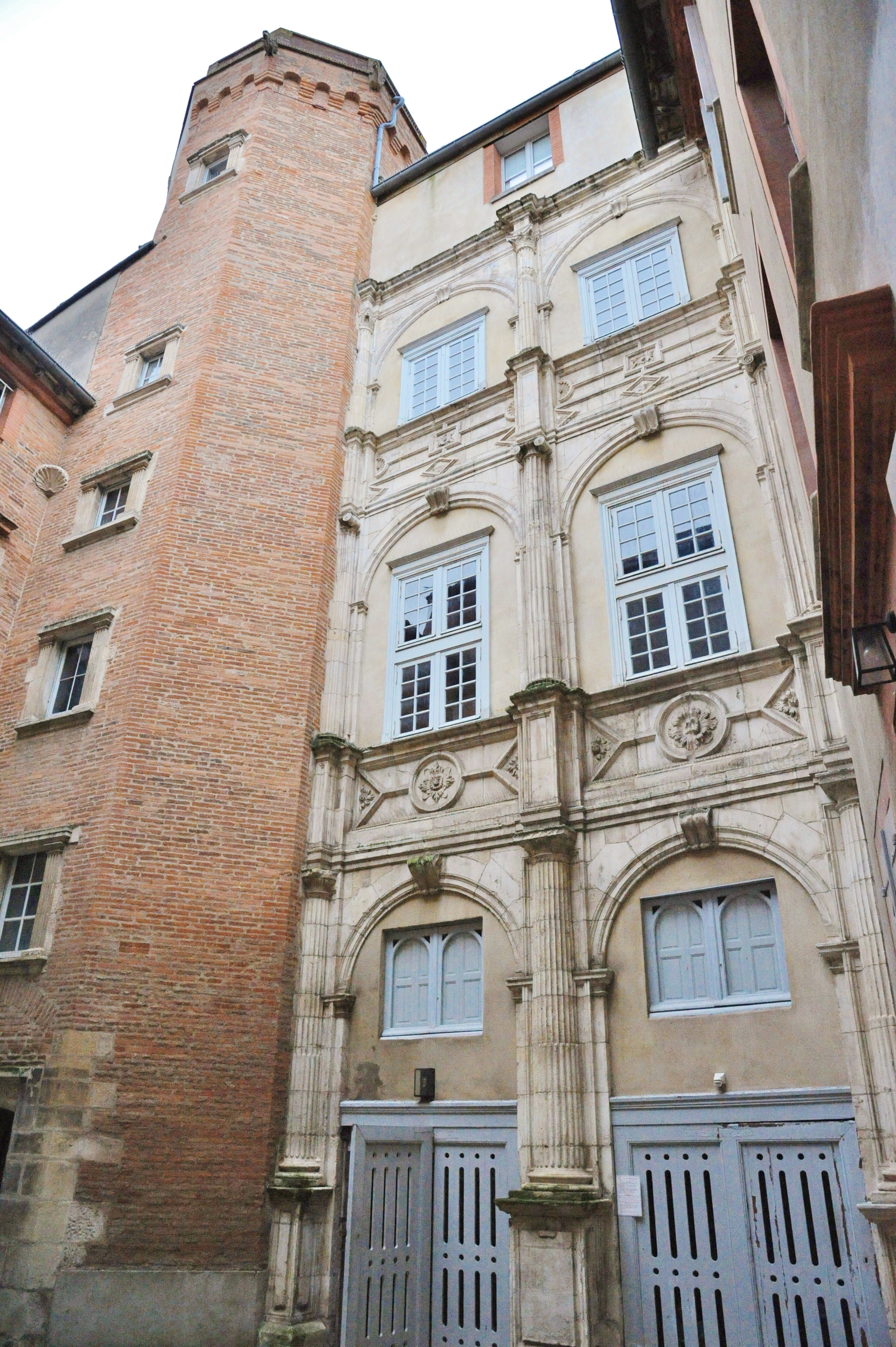
The courtyard of the Hôtel de La Mamye.

The Hôtel de La Mamye in Toulouse, France, is a Renaissance hôtel particulier (palace) of the 16th century.

== History ==
It was built from 1540 for N. de La Mamye and redesigned throughout the 16th century for its descendants, the councilor to the Parliament Guillaume de La Mamye, then Pierre de La Mamye.

The most interesting parts of the hotel are visible in the inner courtyard and date from the 1540s. Large Doric, Ionic, and then Corinthian columns follow one another at each level of the elevation, recalling prestigious Roman monuments such as the Colosseum or the Theatre of Marcellus. The courtyard also features a large polygonal Renaissance stair tower.

The building is organized around a courtyard and a garden. The elevations are of brick, the stone is reserved for the frames of the bays, except for the south elevation of the court entirely in stone.

== Pictures ==
Hôtel de la Mamye

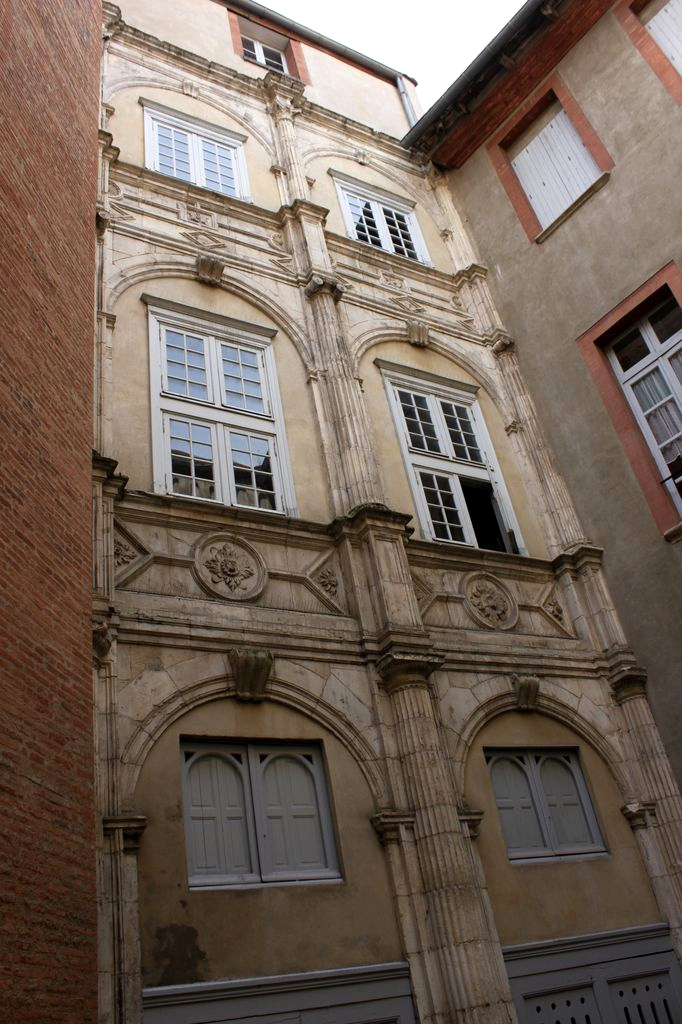
Renaissance facade.

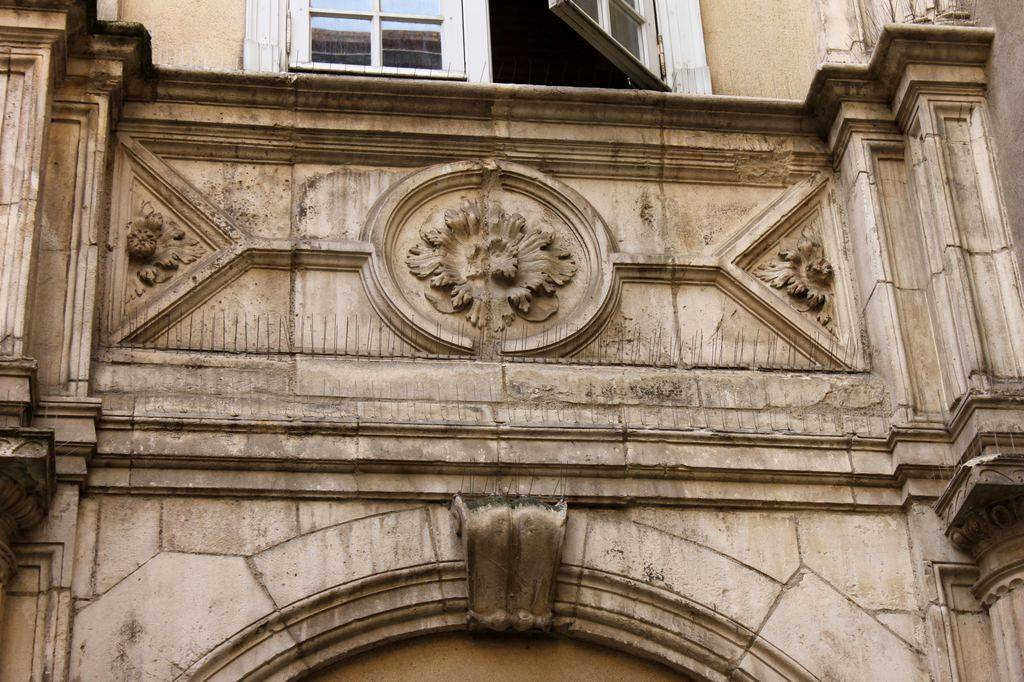

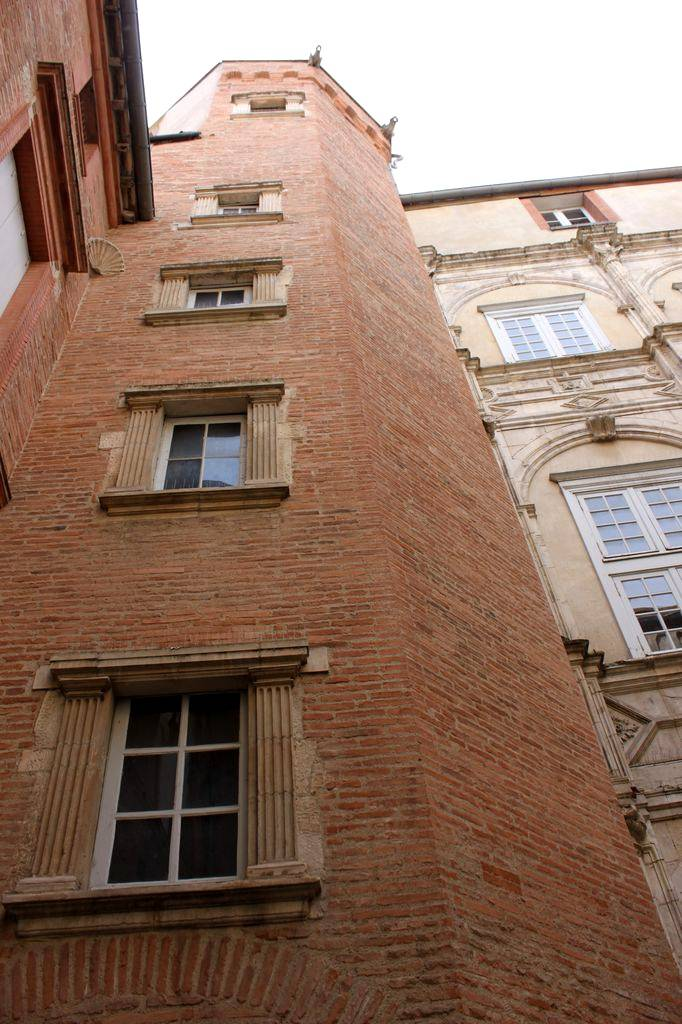
The stair tower.

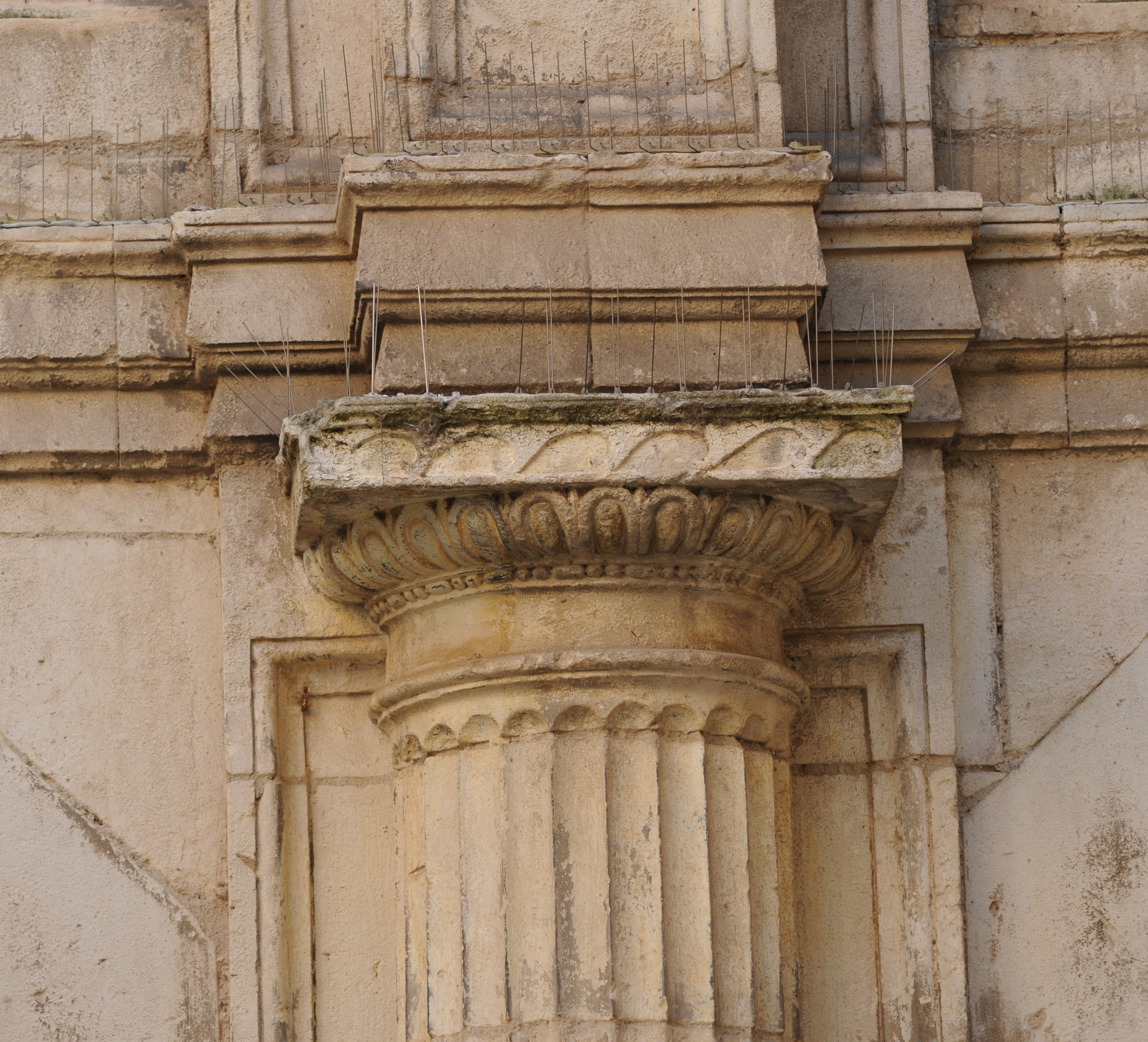
Doric capital.

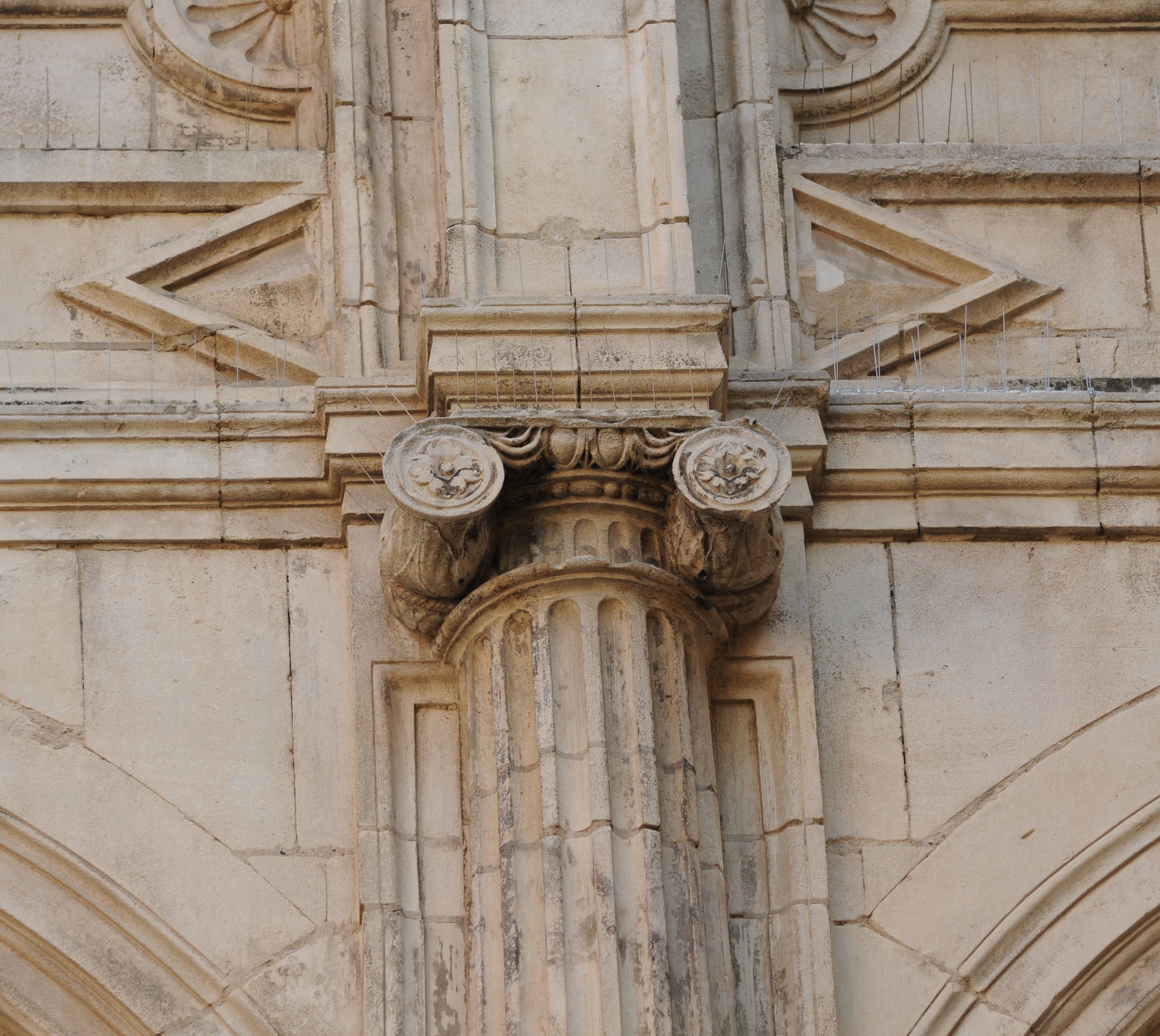
Ionic capital.

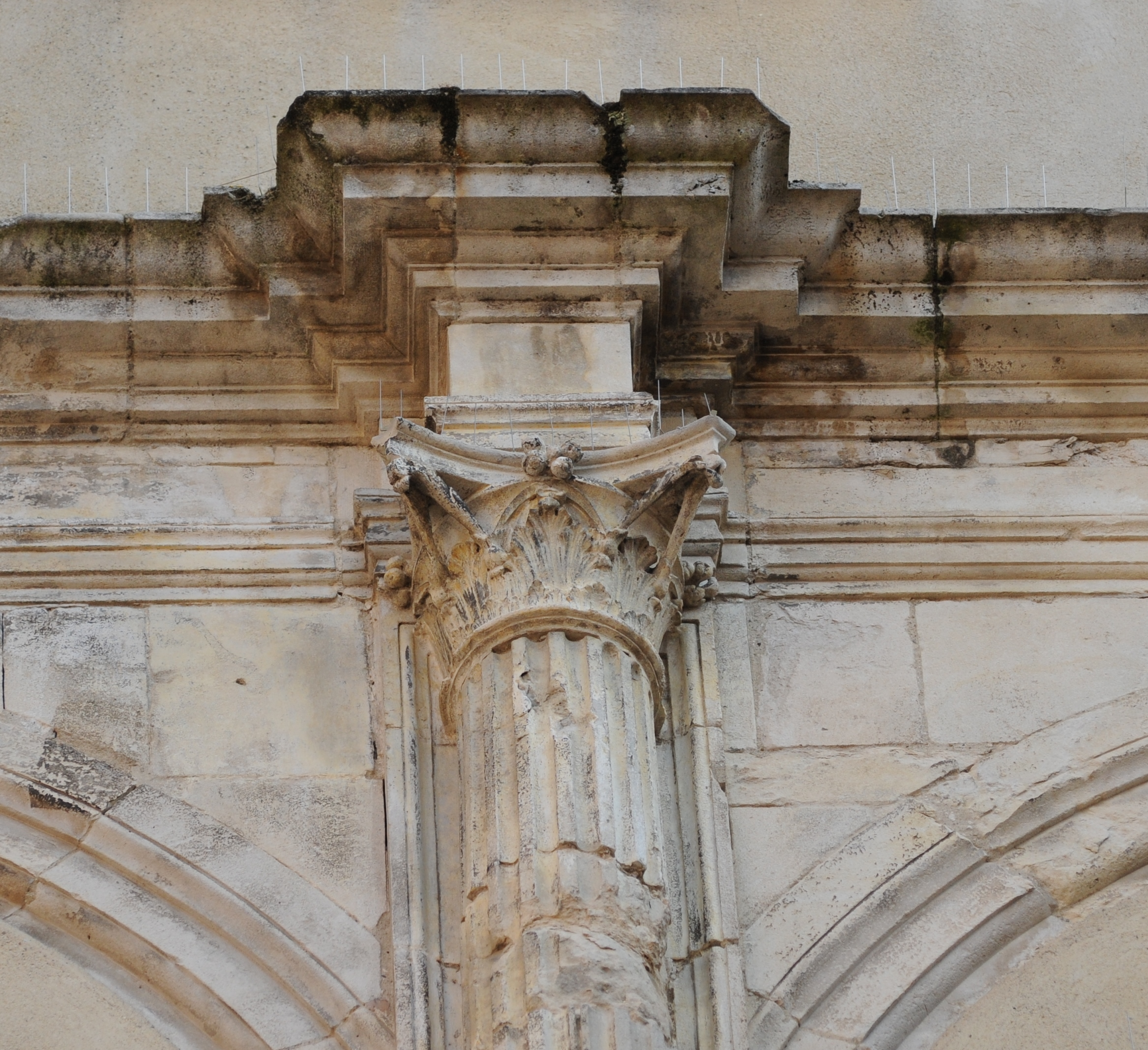
Corinthian capital.

== See also ==
- Renaissance architecture of Toulouse

== Bibliography ==
- Guy Ahlsell de Toulza, Louis Peyrusse, Bruno Tollon, Hôtels et Demeures de Toulouse et du Midi Toulousain, Daniel Briand éditeur, Drémil Lafage, 1997
- Jules Chalande, « Histoire des rues de Toulouse », Mémoires de l'Académie des Sciences et Belles-Lettres de Toulouse, 11e série, tome II, Toulouse, 1914, p. 227-228.
