= Hôtel Prouvost =

- Interactive map of the Hôtel Prouvost area

General information
- Type: hôtel particulier
- Location: 19 rue du Grand-Chemin et 6 rue Rémy-Cogghe, Roubaix, France
- Coordinates: 50°41′29″N 3°09′57″E
- Completed: 1878
- Client: Charles Prouvost-Scrépel

Design and construction
- Architect: Auguste Dupire

The Hôtel Prouvost is a historic hôtel particulier in Roubaix, France. It was built in 1878 for Charles Prouvost-Scrépel. It has been listed as an official historical monument since 1998.
