= Hôtel Mansencal =

Hôtel particulier in Toulouse, France

Coordinates: 43.5964°N 1.4478°E

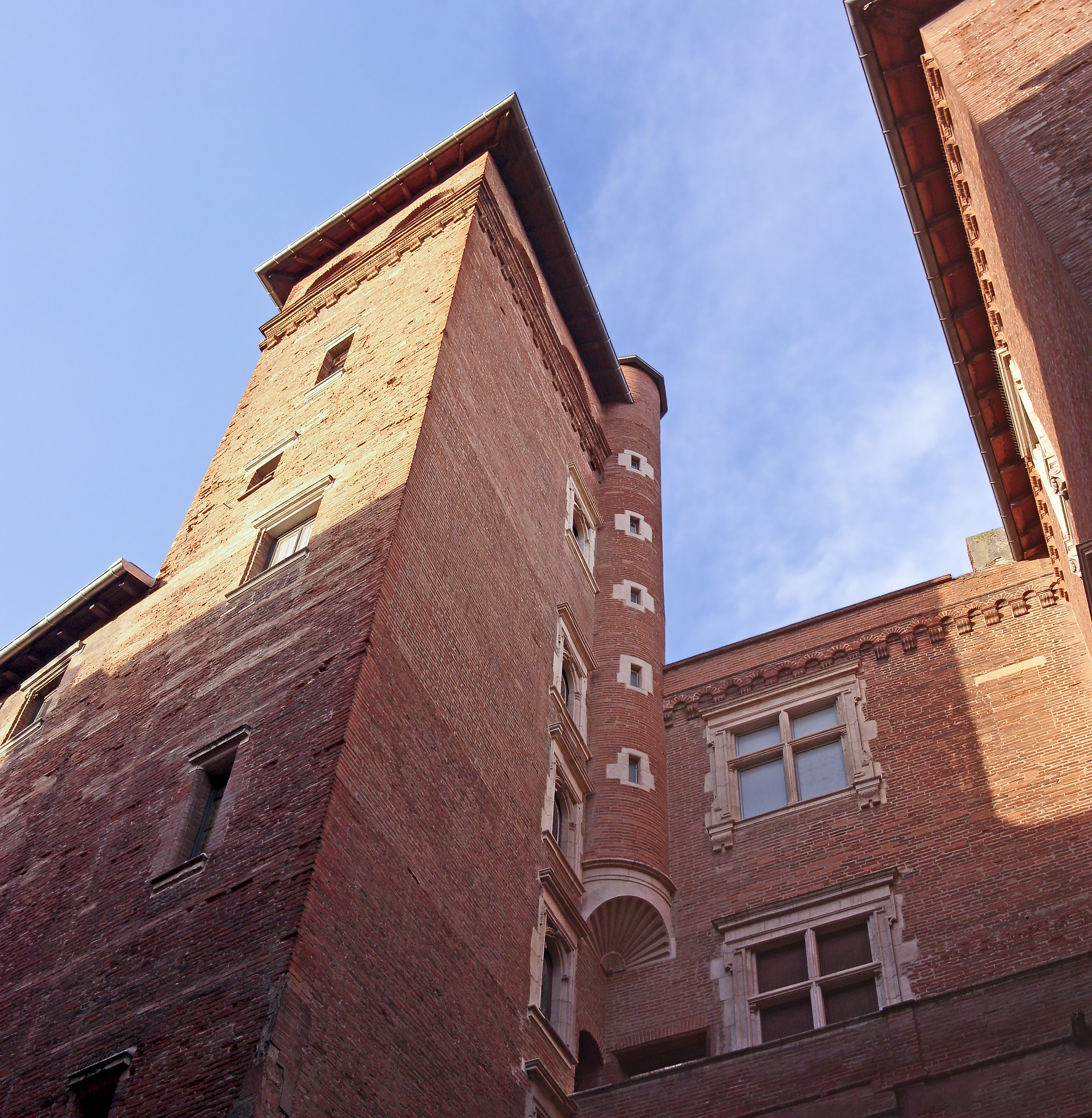
The tower, its corner turret, and the courtyard facades

The Hôtel Mansencal in Toulouse, France, is a Renaissance hôtel particulier (palace) of the 16th century. It is a listed historical monument since 1925.

== History ==
The Hotel Mansencal is a mansion located at 1 rue Espinasse, in the historic center of Toulouse. Constructed in the middle of the 16th century (between 1540 and 1560) for an important Toulouse parliamentarian, Jean de Mansencal, it was deeply altered in the following centuries. The façade on the garden in particular was mutilated by the destruction of four spans out of six.

== Description ==
The street façade is pierced with rectangular windows with stone frames. The porte cochere, with its portal decorated with fluted pilasters, opens onto a courtyard formed by two buildings. The left wing consists of a staircase tower with a corner turret attached to it. This high tower of 30 meters has the shape of a regular square which nevertheless contains a circular staircase. The latter ends with a Corinthian pillar from which eight ribs support a cylindrical arch. The façade on the garden was the most impressive of the hotel and, although it retains only two spans out of the six that had been built, it retains its 16th century Renaissance elevation. The spans offer an example of superposition of orders on three levels, the pilasters actually develop in a traditional way: Doric, Ionic, Corinthian. The windows are inscribed in semicircular arches and have wide double-sided doorframes.

== Pictures ==
Hôtel Mansencal

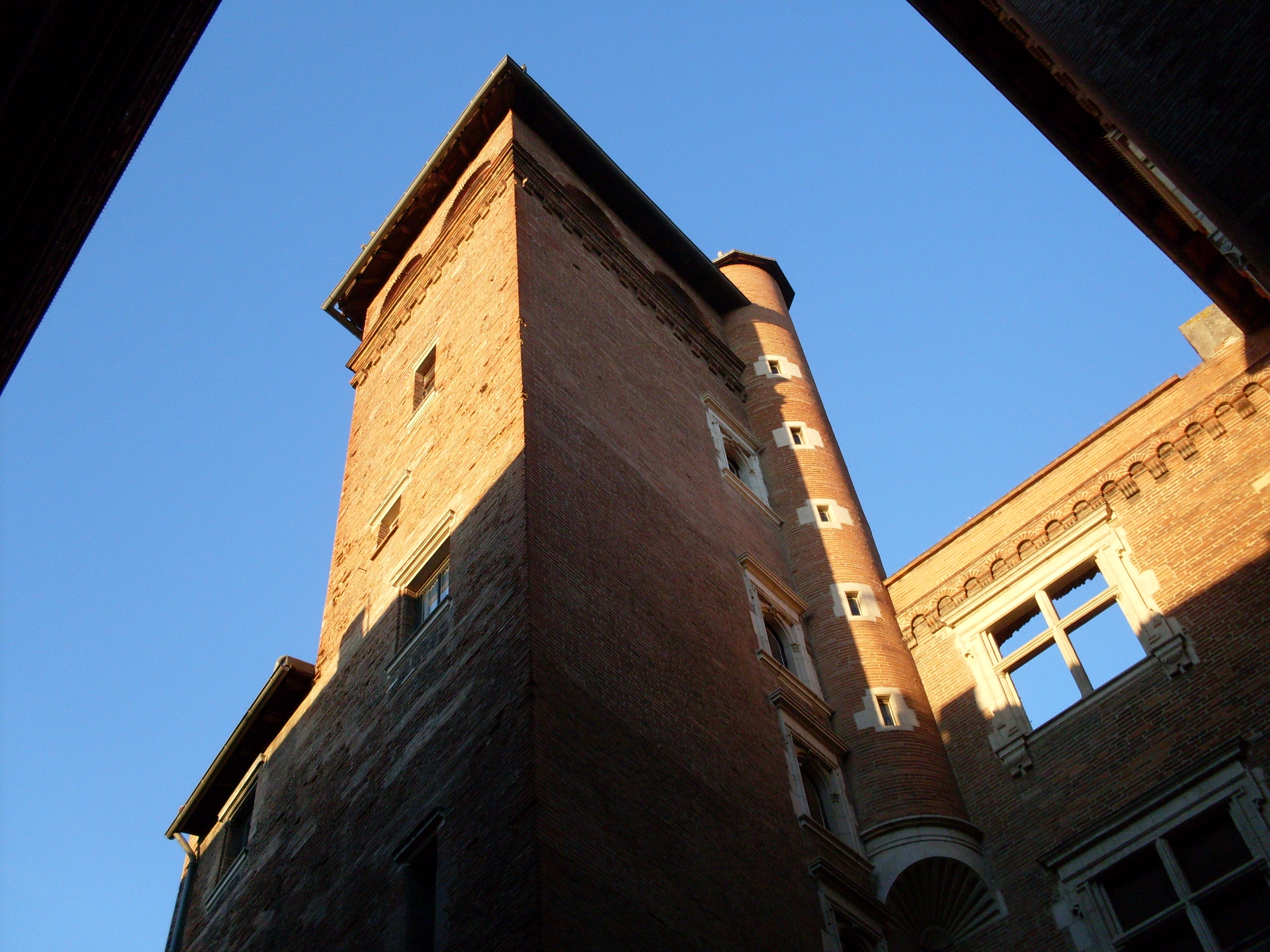
The tower

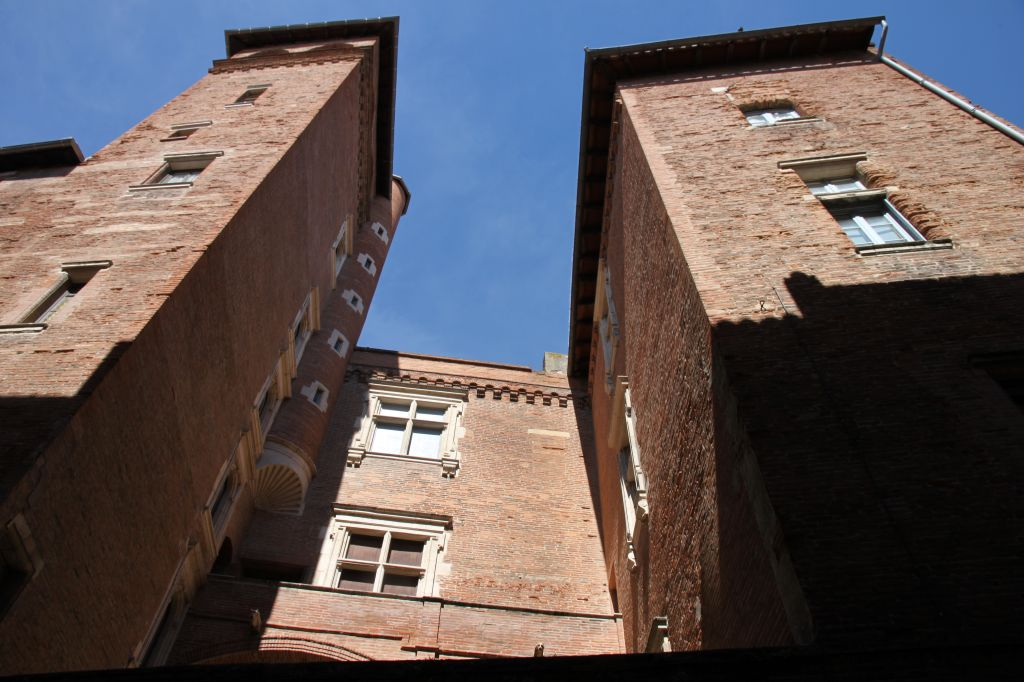
The street facade

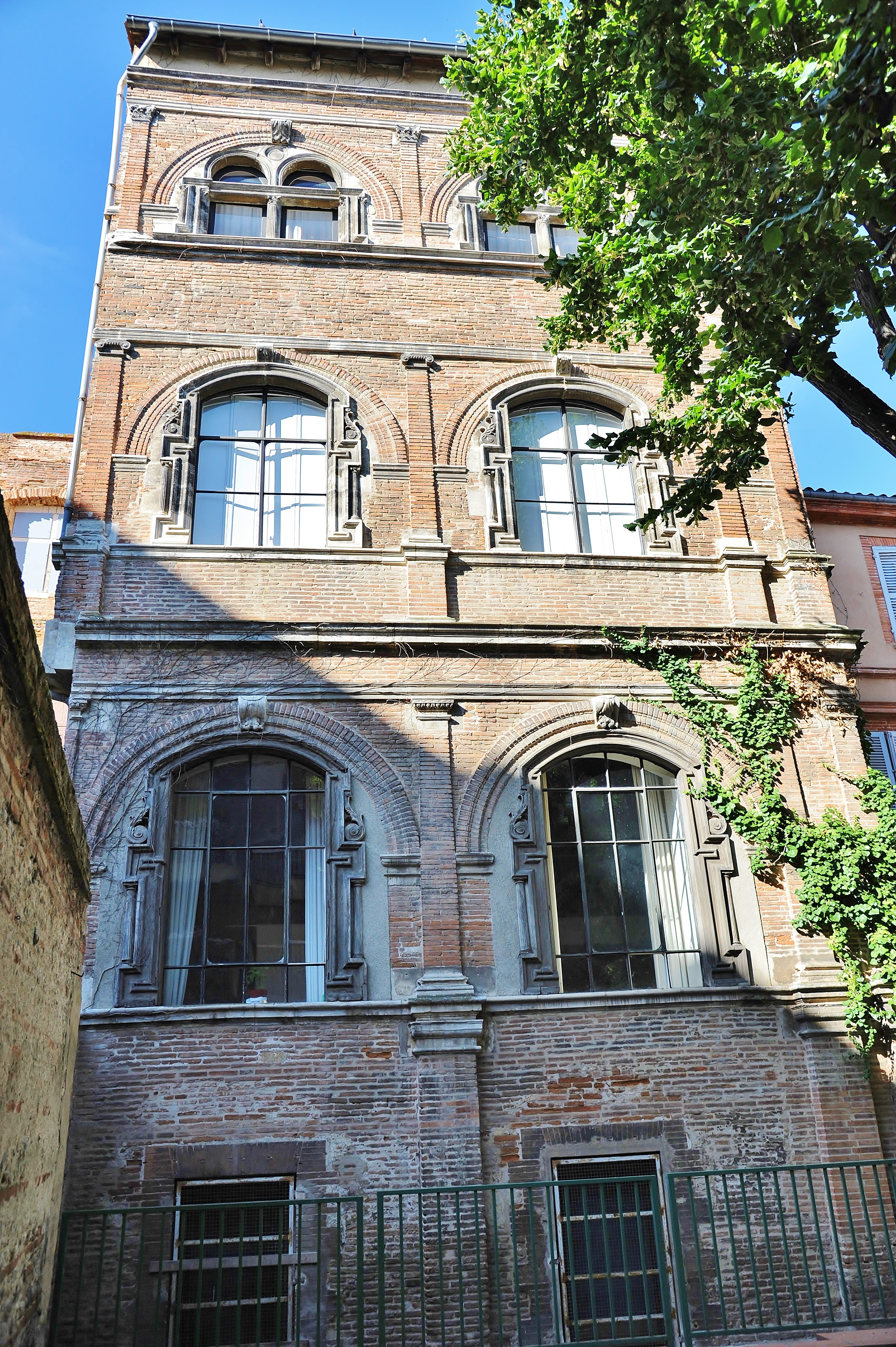
The rear facade

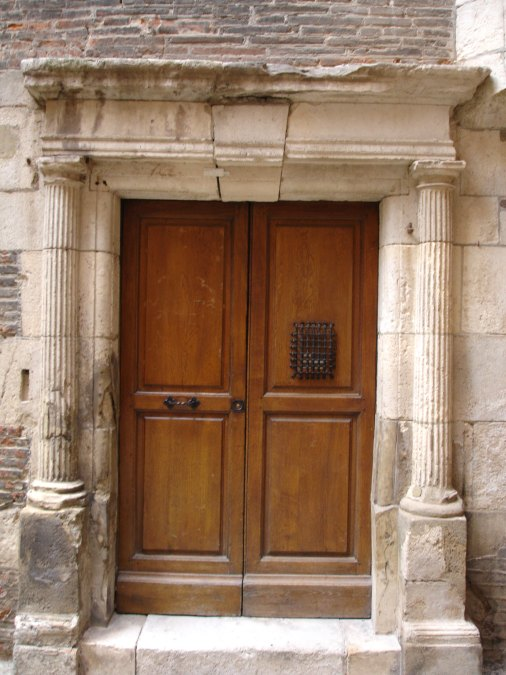
Door of the tower in the courtyard

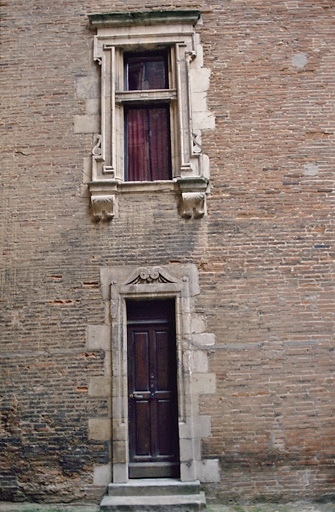
Door in the courtyard
Renaissance windows

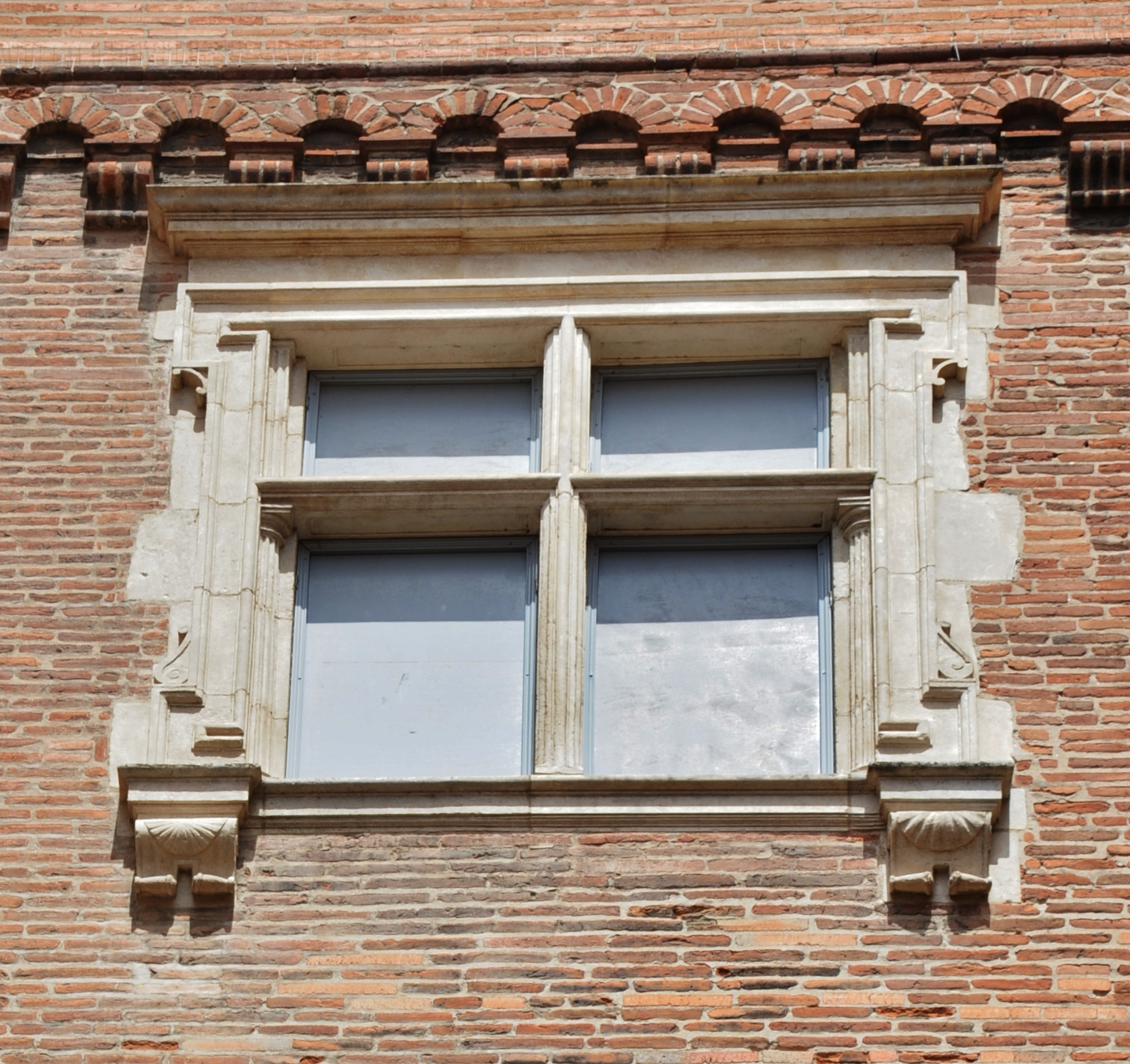

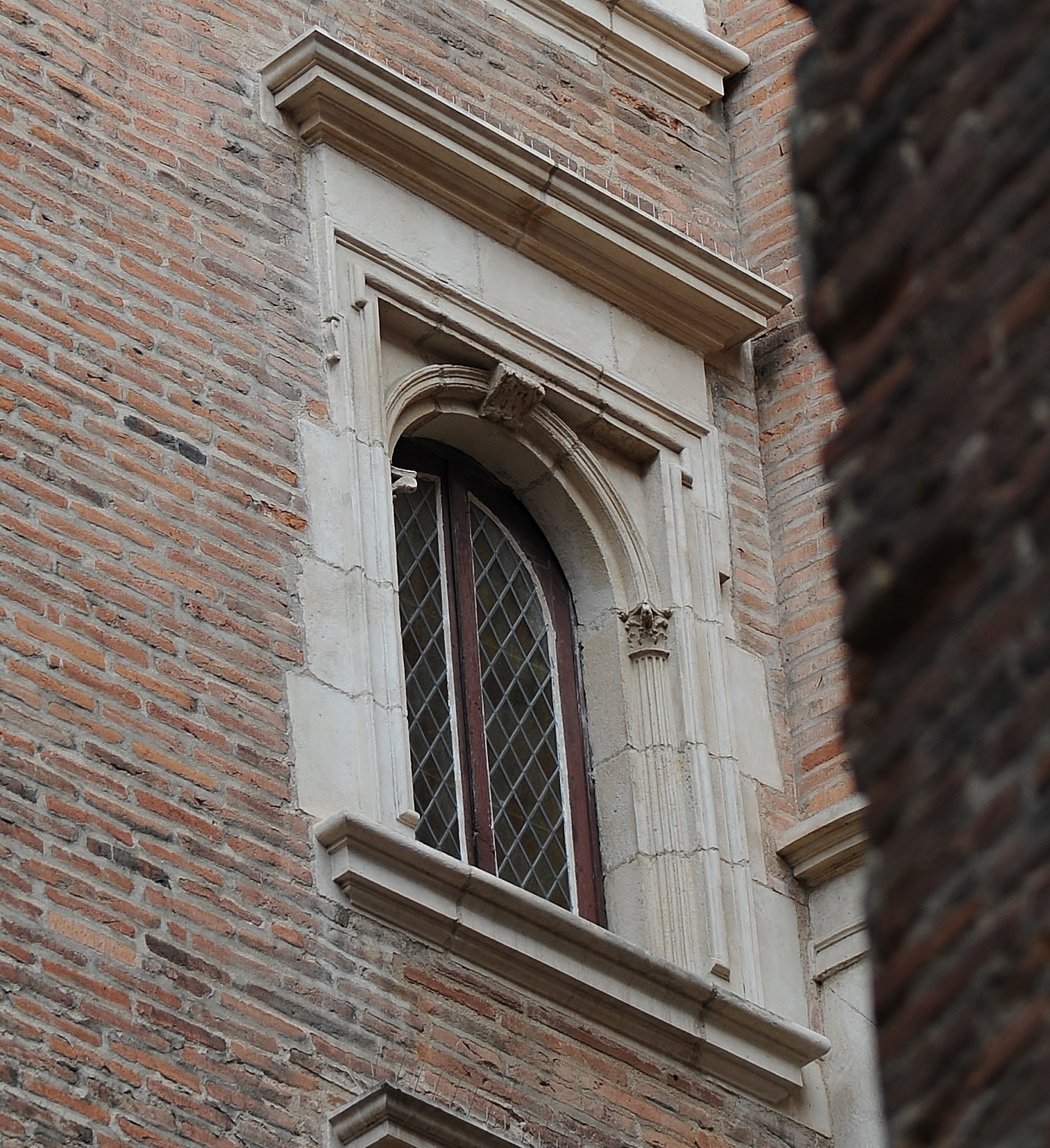

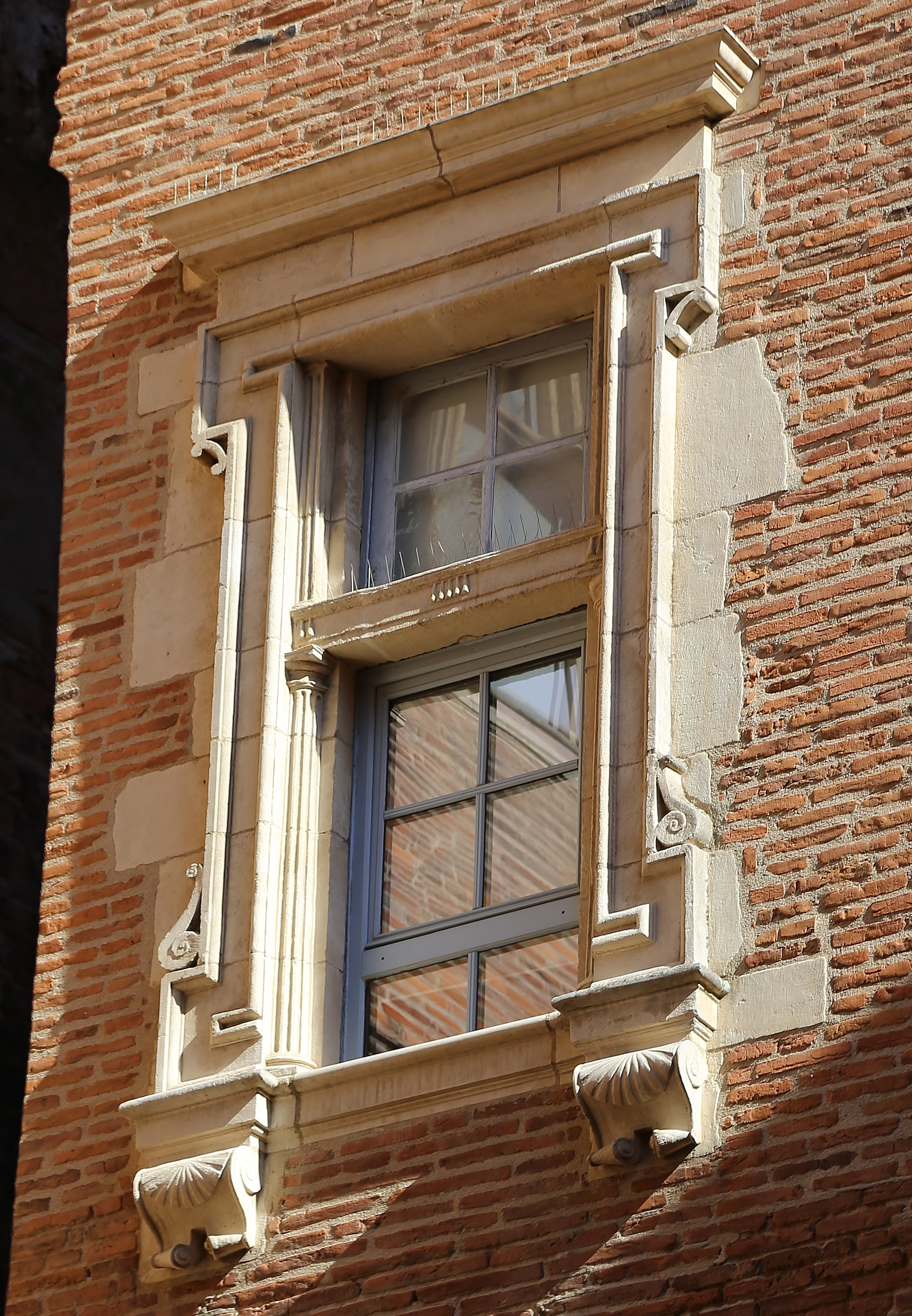

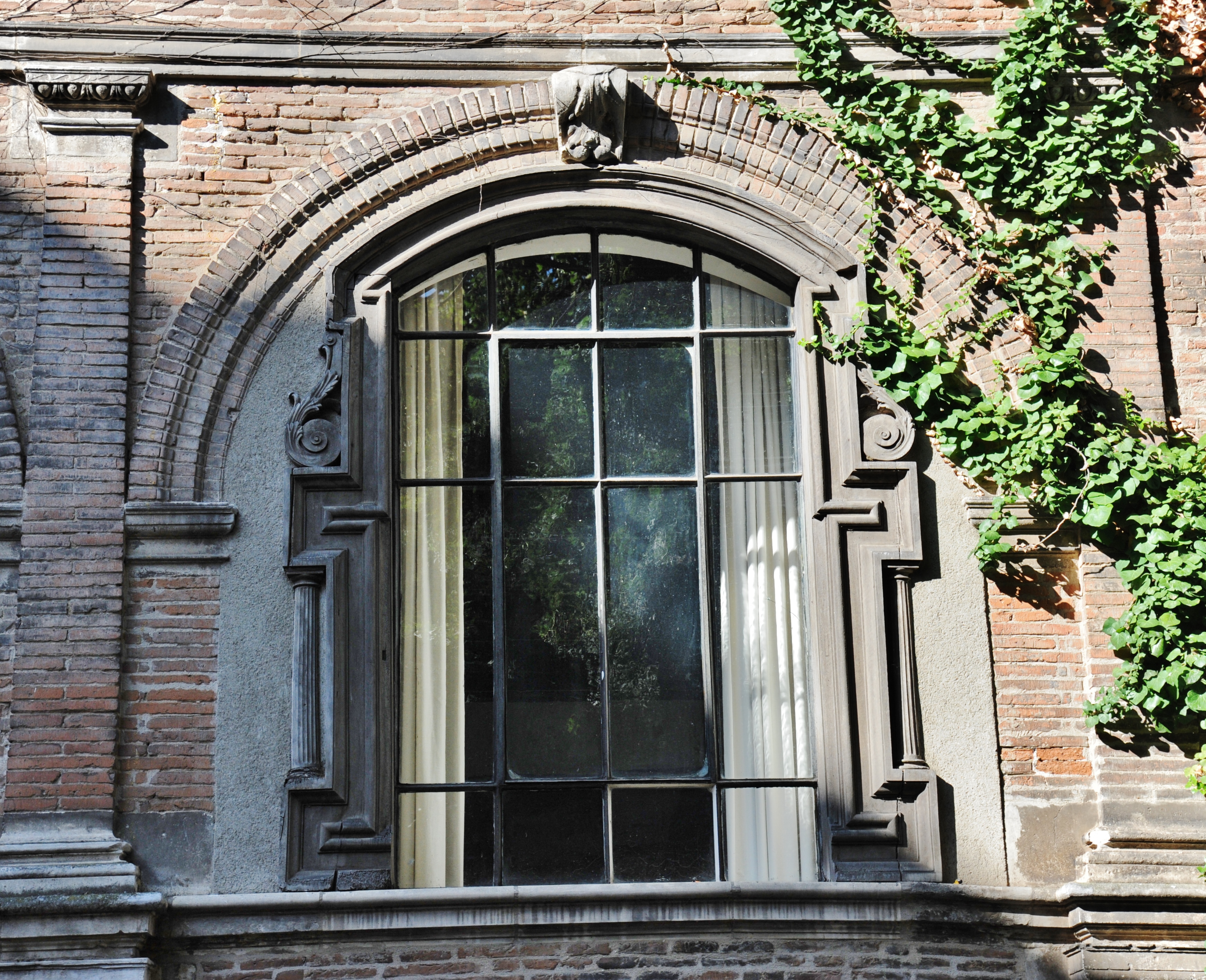

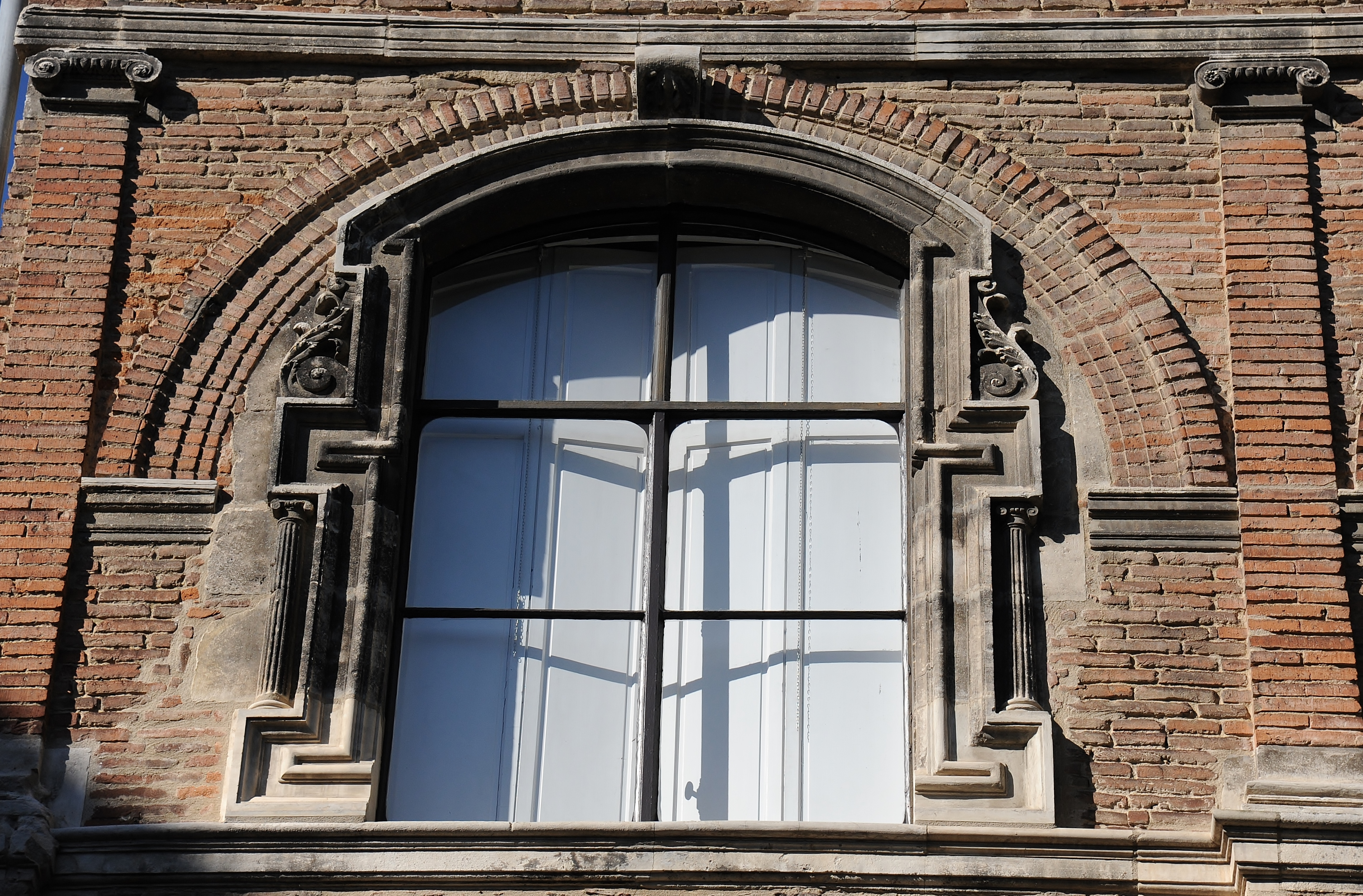

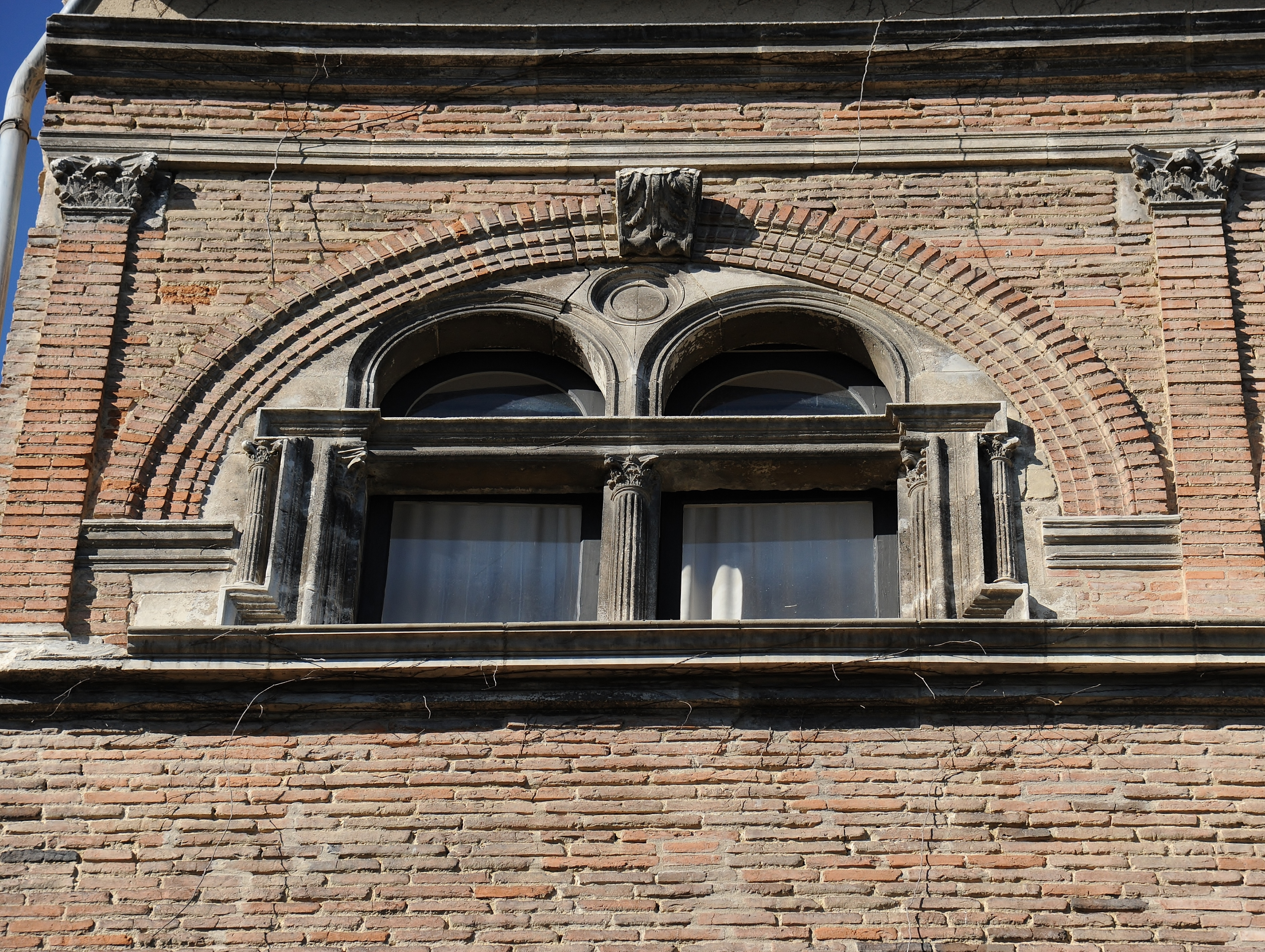

== See also ==
- Renaissance architecture of Toulouse

== Bibliography ==
- Guy Ahlsell de Toulza, Louis Peyrusse, Bruno Tollon, Hôtels et Demeures de Toulouse et du Midi Toulousain, Daniel Briand éditeur, Drémil Lafage, 1997
