= Hôtel particulier =

French term for a grand town house

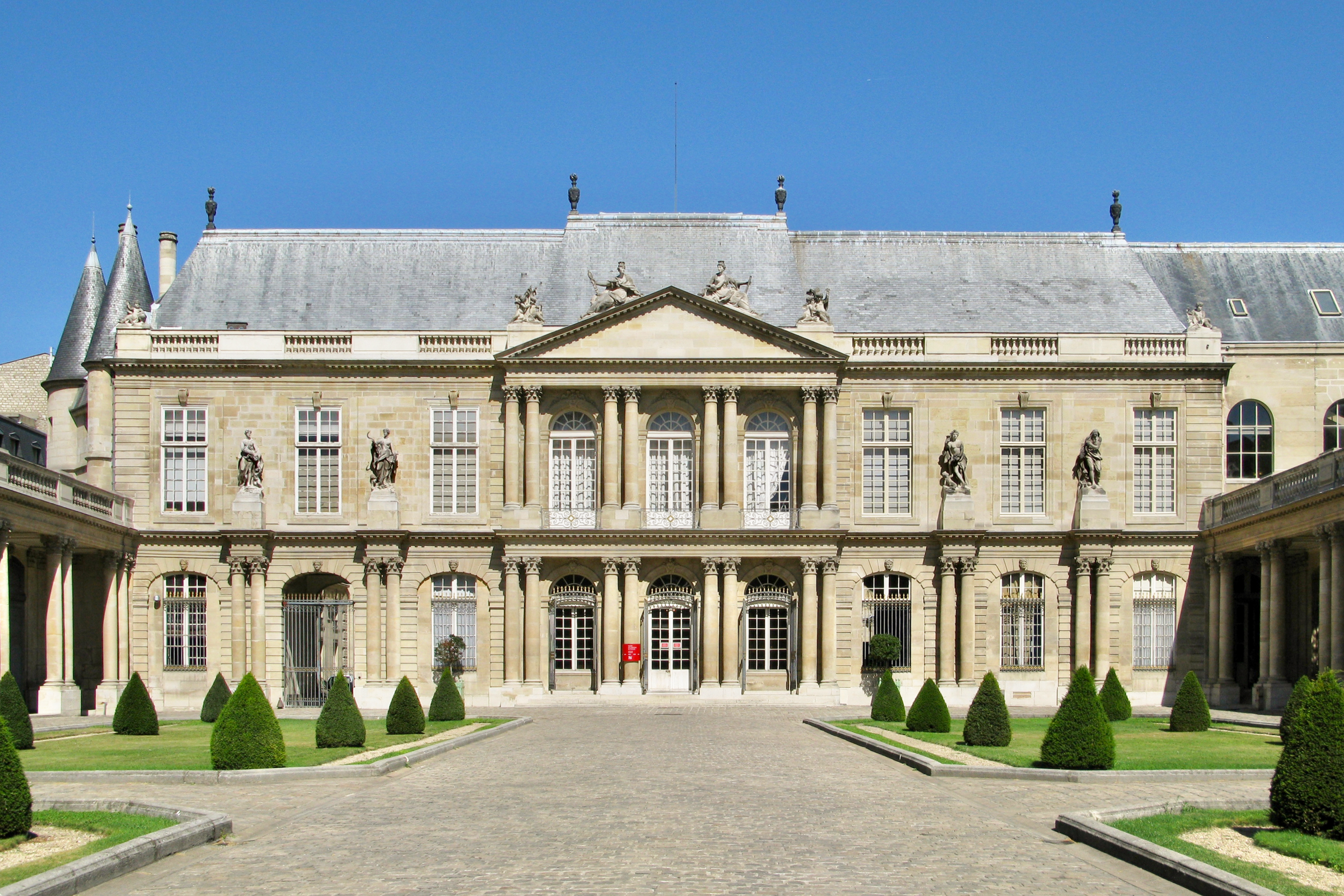
The Hôtel de Soubise in Paris now houses part of the French National Archives.

Hôtel particulier (French: [otɛl paʁtikylje]) is the French term for a grand urban mansion, comparable to a British townhouse. Whereas an ordinary maison (house) was built as part of a row, sharing party walls with the houses on either side and directly fronting on a street, an hôtel particulier was often free-standing and, by the 18th century, would always be located entre cour et jardin – between the cour d'honneur (an entrance court) and the garden behind. There are hôtels particuliers in many large cities in France.

== Etymology and meaning ==
The word hôtel represents the Old French "hostel" from the Latin hospitālis "pertaining to guests", from hospes, a stranger, thus a guest. The adjective particulier means "personal" or "private".

The English word hotel developed a more specific meaning as a commercial building accommodating travellers; modern French also uses hôtel in this sense. For example, the Hôtel de Crillon on the Place de la Concorde was built as an hôtel particulier and is today a public hotel.

In French, an hôtel de ville or mairie is a town hall and not a hotel, same for the police station that can be called an hôtel de police. Other official bodies might give their name to the structure in which they maintained a seat: besides Paris, several other French cities have an Hôtel de Cluny, maintained by the abbey of Cluny. The Hôtel de Sens was built as the Paris residence of the archbishop of Sens. The Hôtel de Bourgogne in Paris was a theatre, taking its name from the former Paris residence of the Dukes of Burgundy on the site. The Hôtel de la Marine, now a museum, took its name when it was the naval ministry building.

Hôtel-Dieu ("hostel of God") is the old name given to the principal hospital in French towns (and those in Quebec), such as the Hôtel-Dieu de Beaune. The Hôtel des Invalides in Paris retains its early sense of a hospital for war wounded.

== Examples ==
=== In Aix-en-Provence ===
- Hôtel d'Arbaud-Jouques
- Hôtel de Boisgelin
- Hôtel Boyer de Fonscolombe
- Hôtel de Caumont
- Hôtel de Forbin
- Hôtel de Gantès
- Hôtel de Grimaldi-Régusse
- Hôtel du Poët
- Hôtel Silvy
- Hôtel de Simiane
- Hôtel de Valbelle
- Hôtel de Villeneuve d'Ansouis

=== In Beaucaire ===
- Hôtel de Clausonnette
- Hôtel de Linage
- Hôtel de Margallier

=== In Blois ===
- Hôtel d'Alluye

=== In Bordeaux ===
- Palais Rohan
- Hôtel de Laubardemont
- Hôtel de Ragueneau
- Hôtel Copmartin
- Hôtel de l'Intendance
- Hôtel de Saige
- Hôtel Nairac
- Hôtel de Lalande
- Hôtel Bonnaffé
- Hôtel Gradis
- Hôtel Victoria
- Château Labottière
- Petit hôtel Labottière
- Hôtel Leberthon
- Hôtel de Poissac
- Hôtel de Basquiat
- Hôtel Saint-Marc
- Hôtel Fenwick
- Hôtel Frugès

=== In Paris ===
- Hôtel de Soubise
- Hôtel Salomon de Rothschild
- Hôtel Lambert
- Hôtel Matignon
- Hôtel de Sens
- Hôtel de Rambouillet
- Hôtel Biron
- Hôtel d'Evreux
- Hôtel de Cluny
- Hôtel Carnavalet
- Hôtel de Salm
- Hôtel Grimod de La Reynière
- Hôtel Jacquemart-André
- Hôtel de Marigny
- Hôtel Mortemart
- Hôtel de Noirmoutier
- Hôtel de Lauzun
- Hôtel de Beauvais
- Hôtel de Boisgelin
- Hôtel de Besenval
- Hôtel Bonaparte

=== In Rennes ===
- Hôtel de Blossac

=== In Toulouse ===
- Hôtel d'Assézat
- Hôtel d'Astorg et de Saint-Germain
- Hôtel de Bagis
- Hôtel de Bernuy
- Hôtel de Boysson-Cheverry
- Hôtel de Brucelles
- Hôtel de Buet
- Hôtel Dahus
- Hôtel Dumay
- Hôtel de Felzins
- Hôtel Jean de Pins
- Hôtel de La Mamye
- Hôtel Mansencal
- Hôtel Thomas de Montval
- Hôtel d'Ulmo
- Hôtel du Vieux-Raisin

=== In Vesoul ===
- Hôtel de Pétremand

== Gallery ==
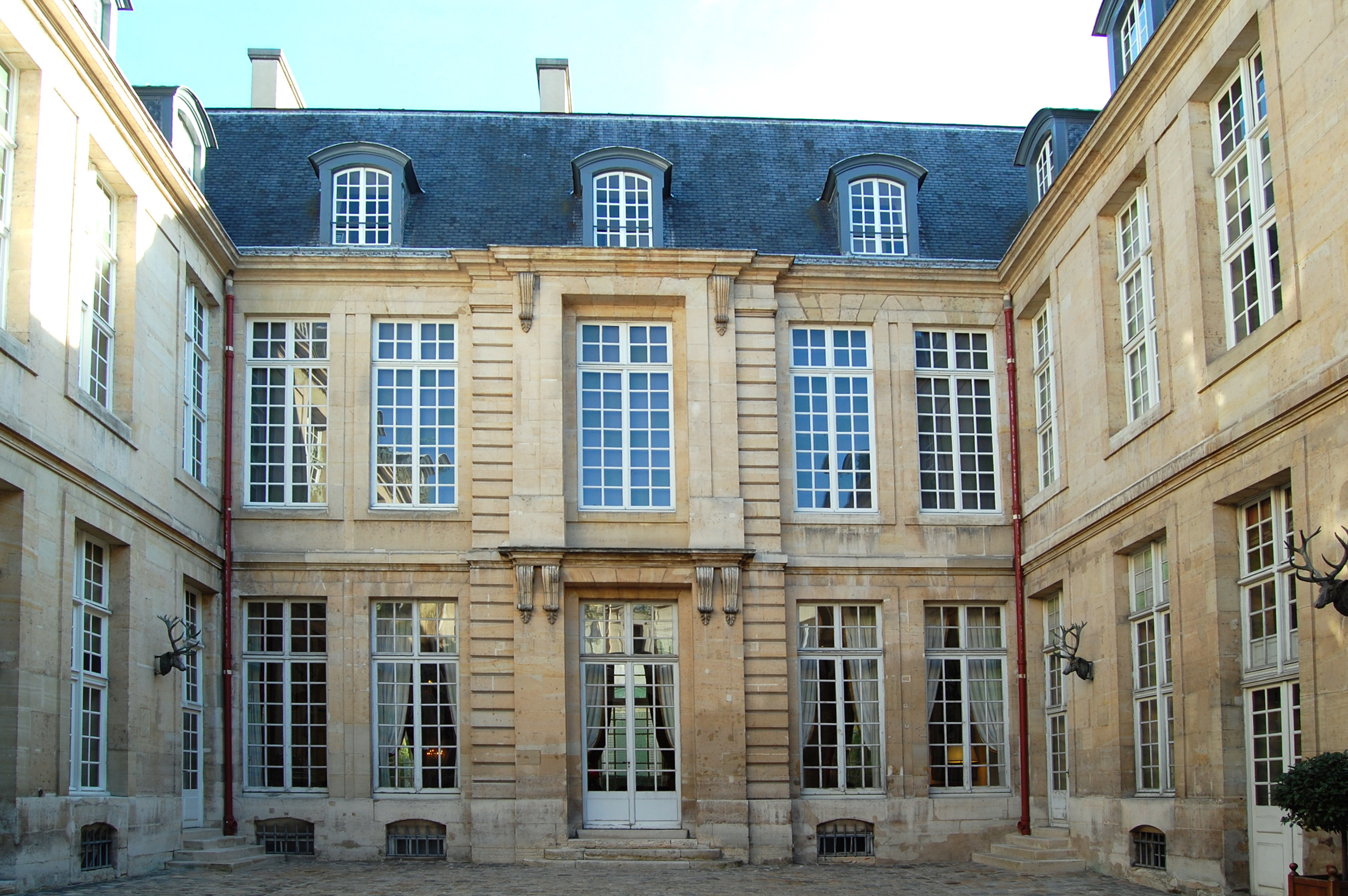
Hôtel de Guénégaud in Paris

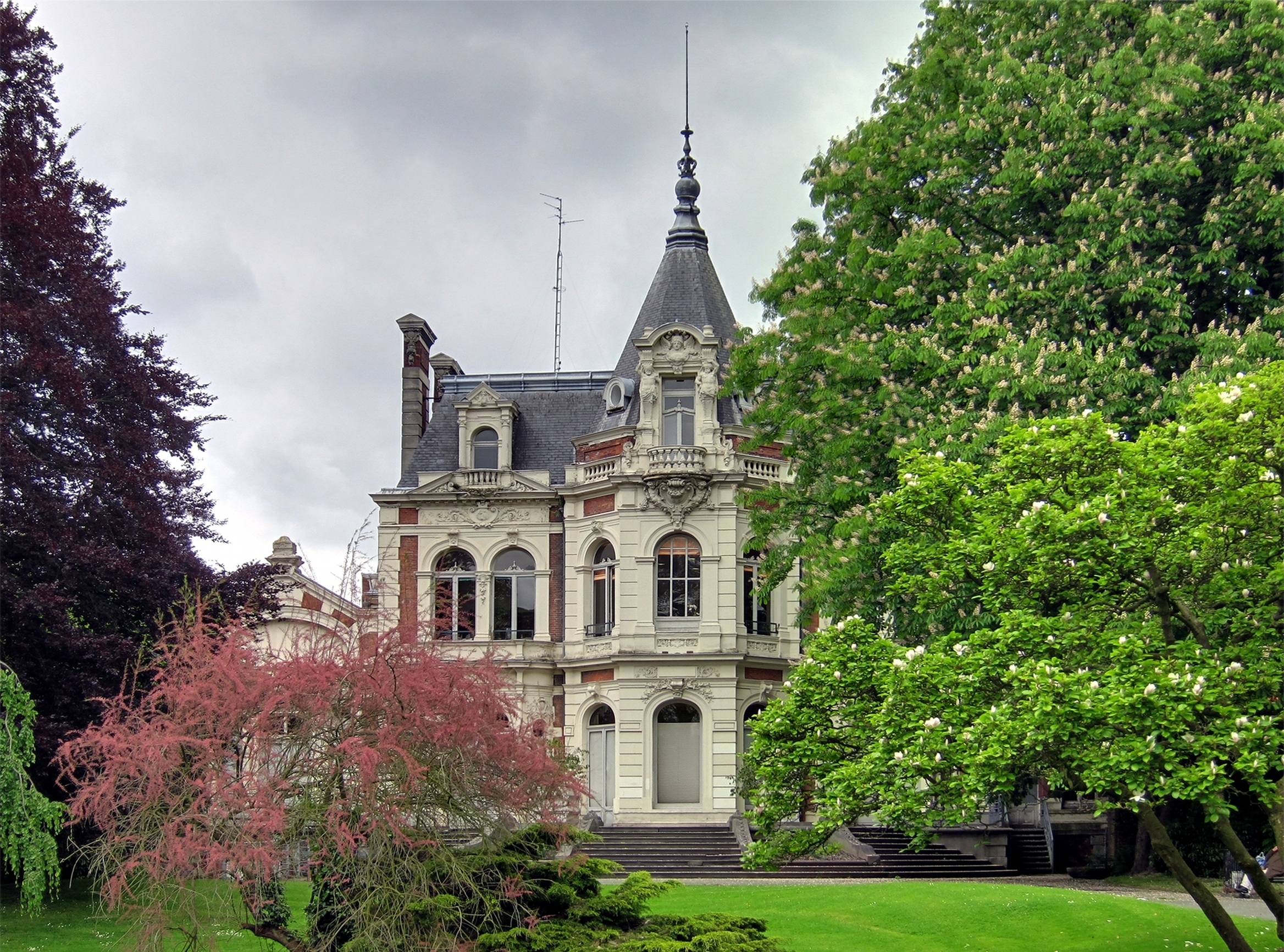
Hôtel Prouvost in Roubaix

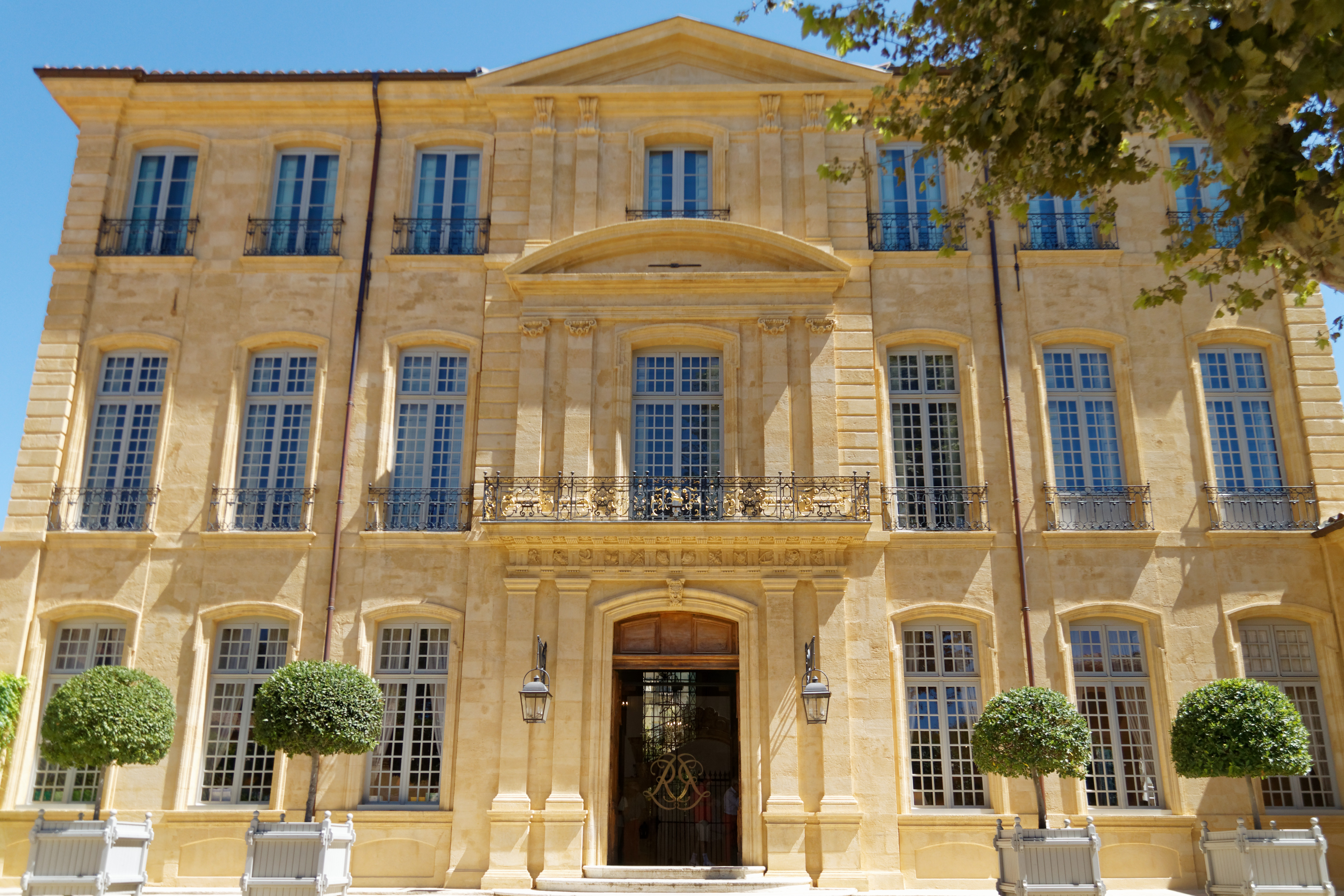
Hôtel de Caumont in Aix-en-Provence

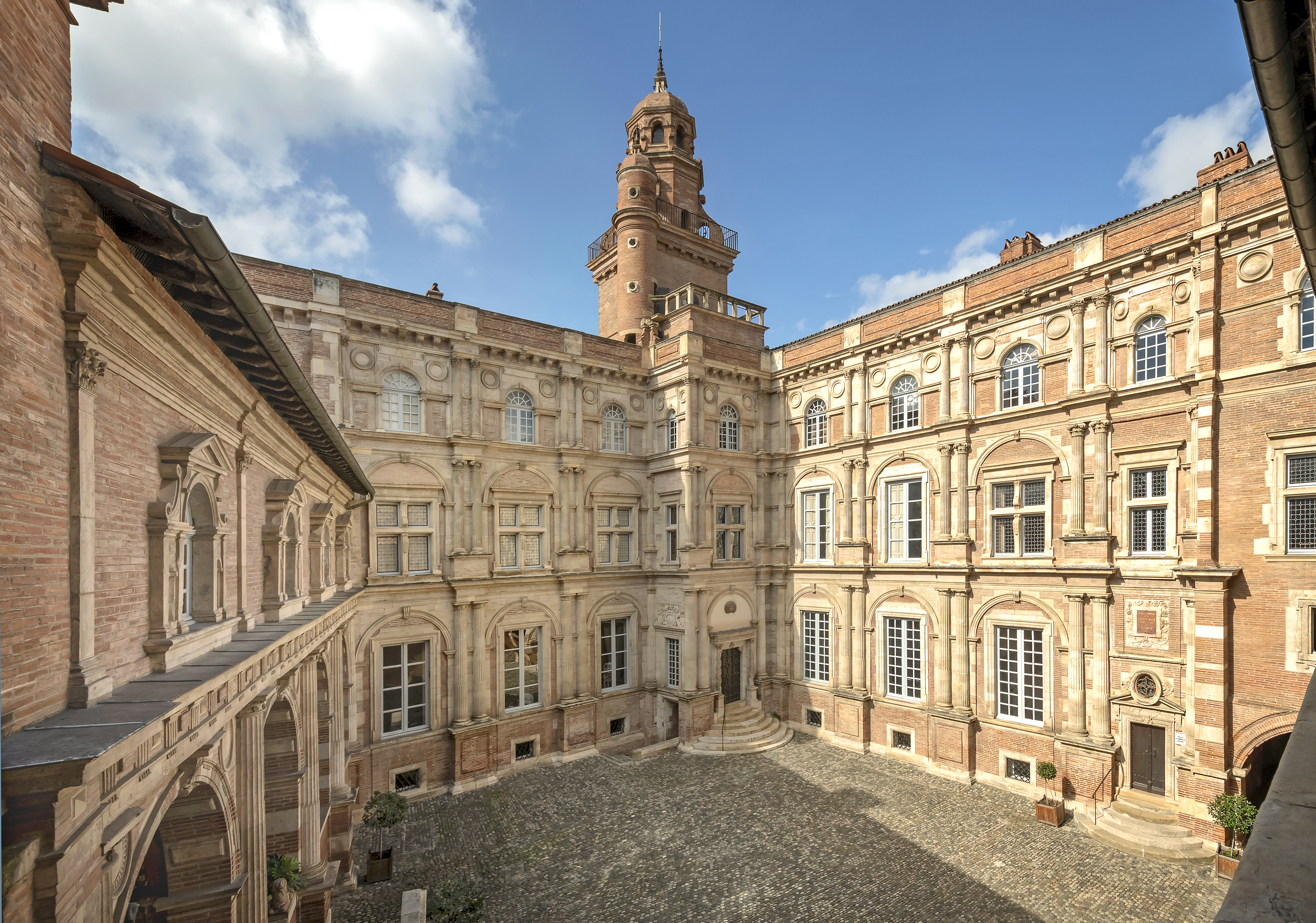
Hôtel d'Assézat in Toulouse

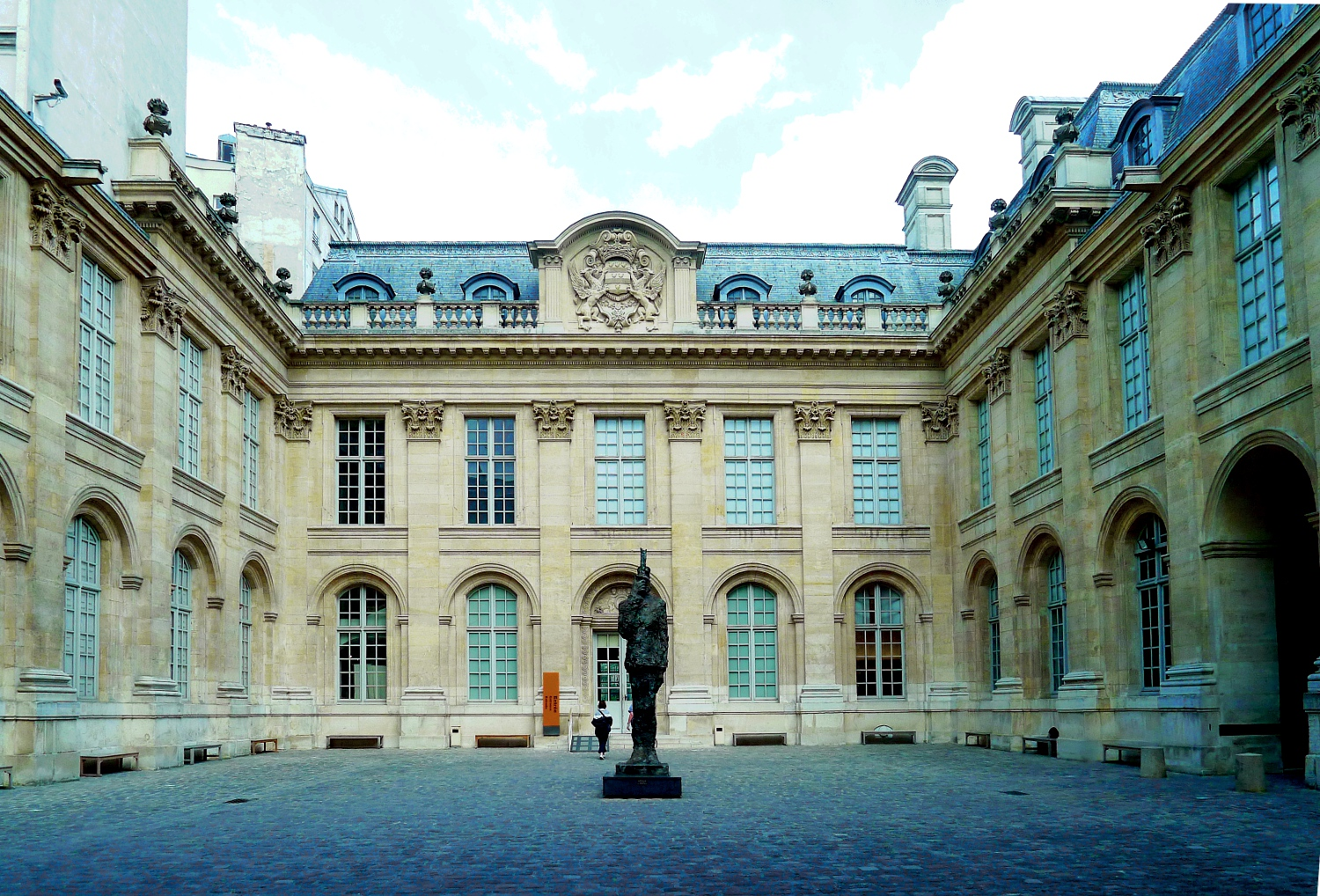
Hôtel de Saint-Aignan in Paris

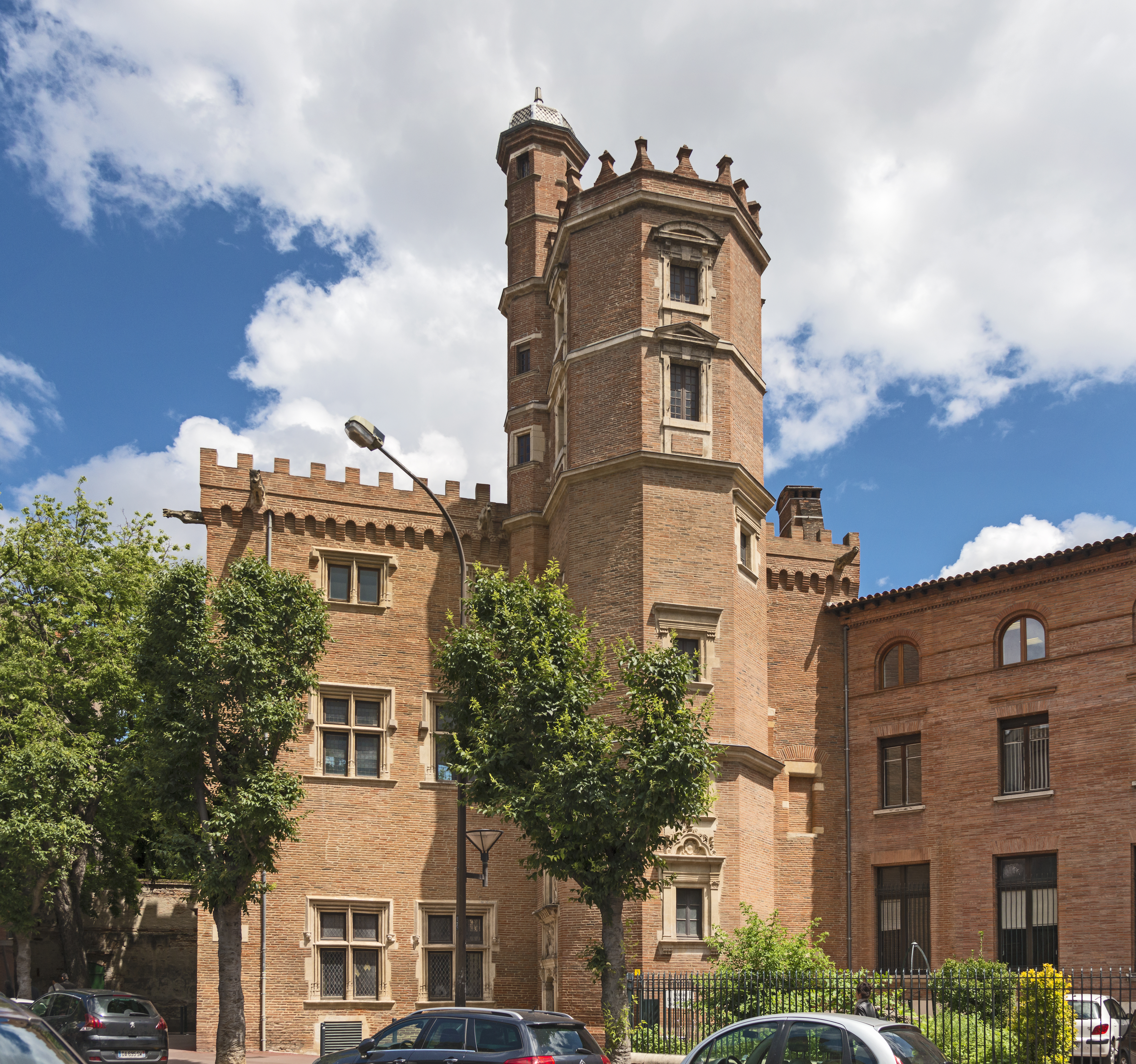
Hôtel Dahus in Toulouse

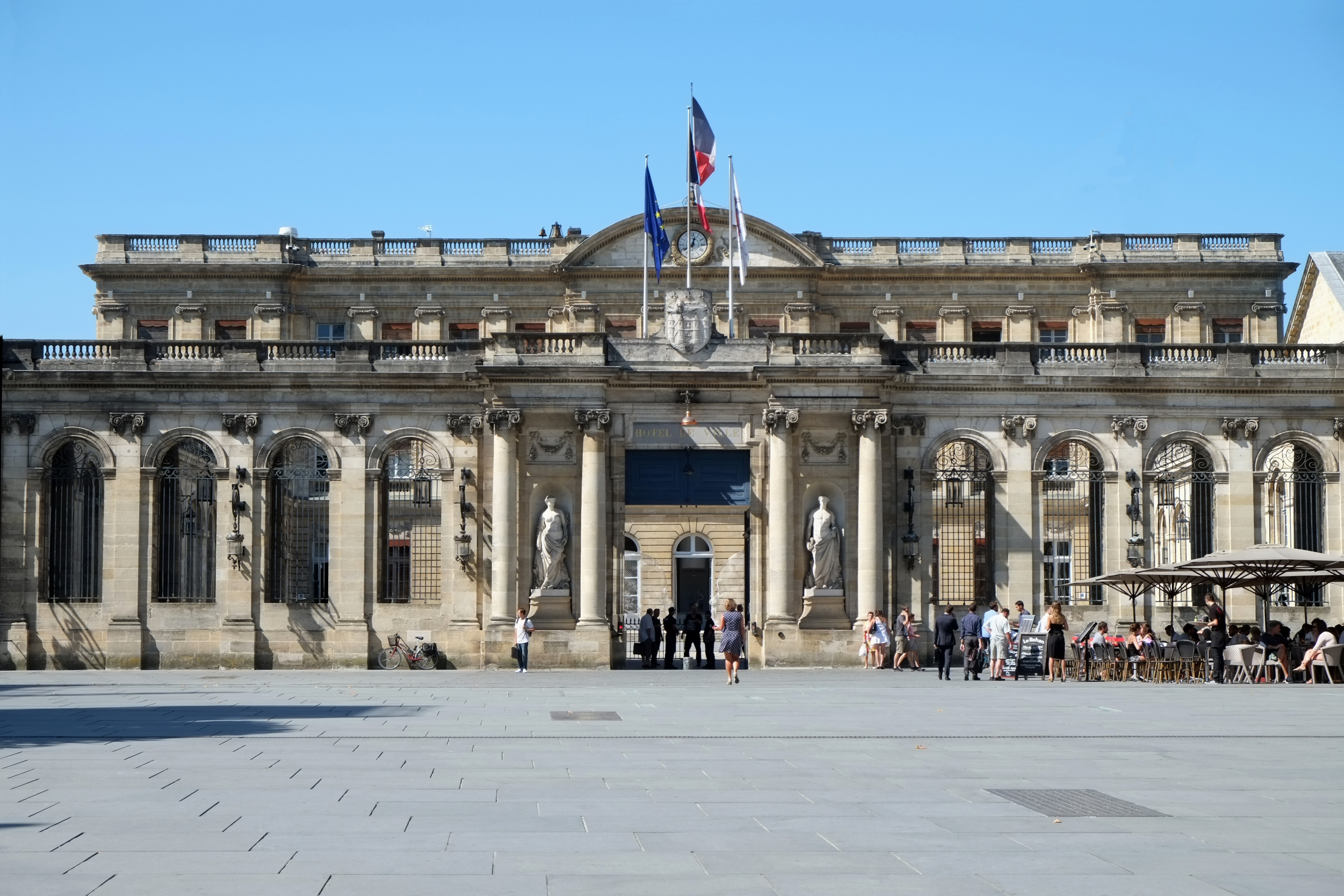
Palais Rohan, in Bordeaux

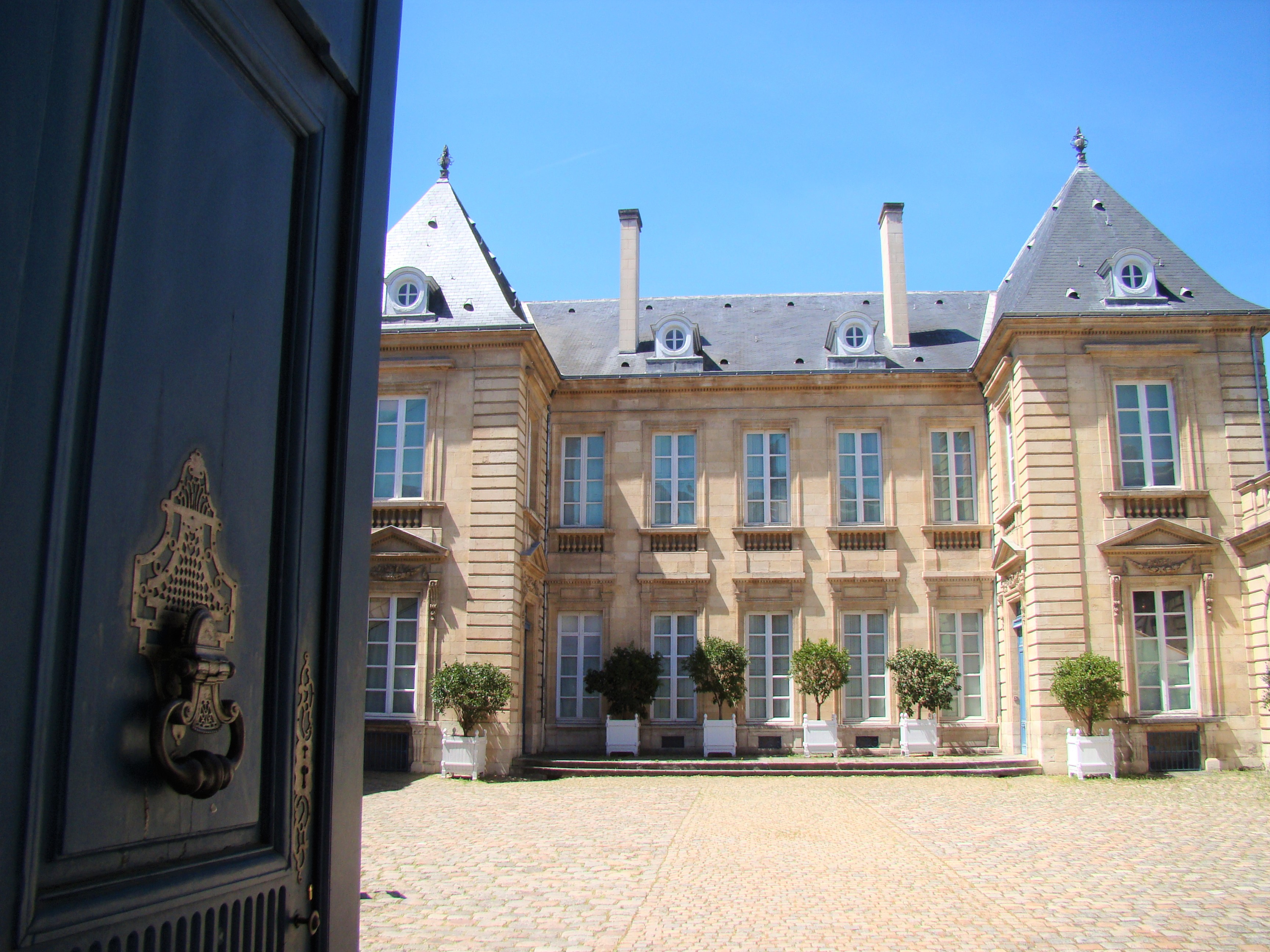
Hôtel de Lalande, in Bordeaux

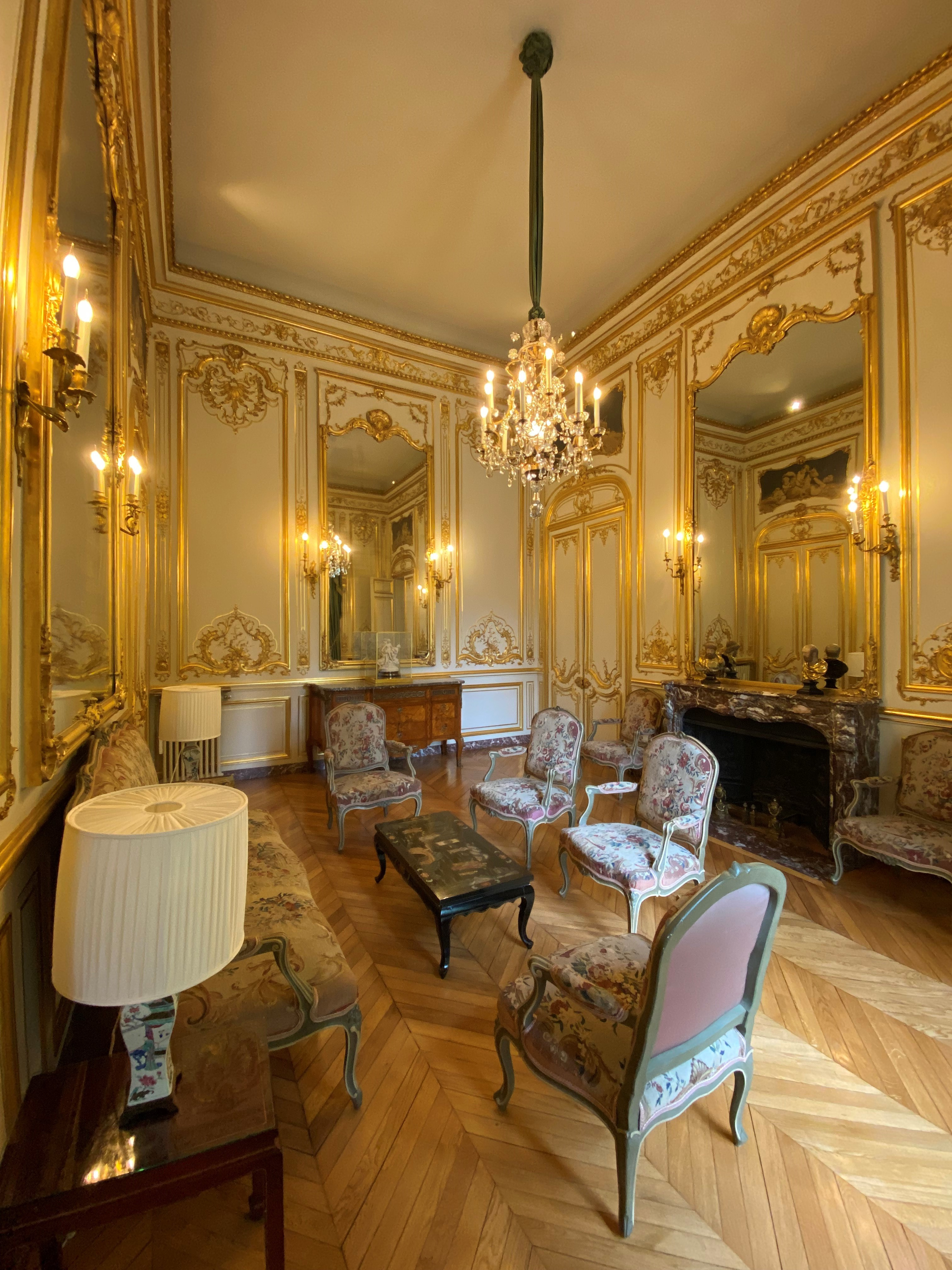
Hôtel de Besenval in Paris

== See also ==
- List of hôtels particuliers in Paris
- Domus
- Château
- Mansion
- Single-family detached home
