= Hôtel de Bernuy =

- Hôtel Bernuy (French)
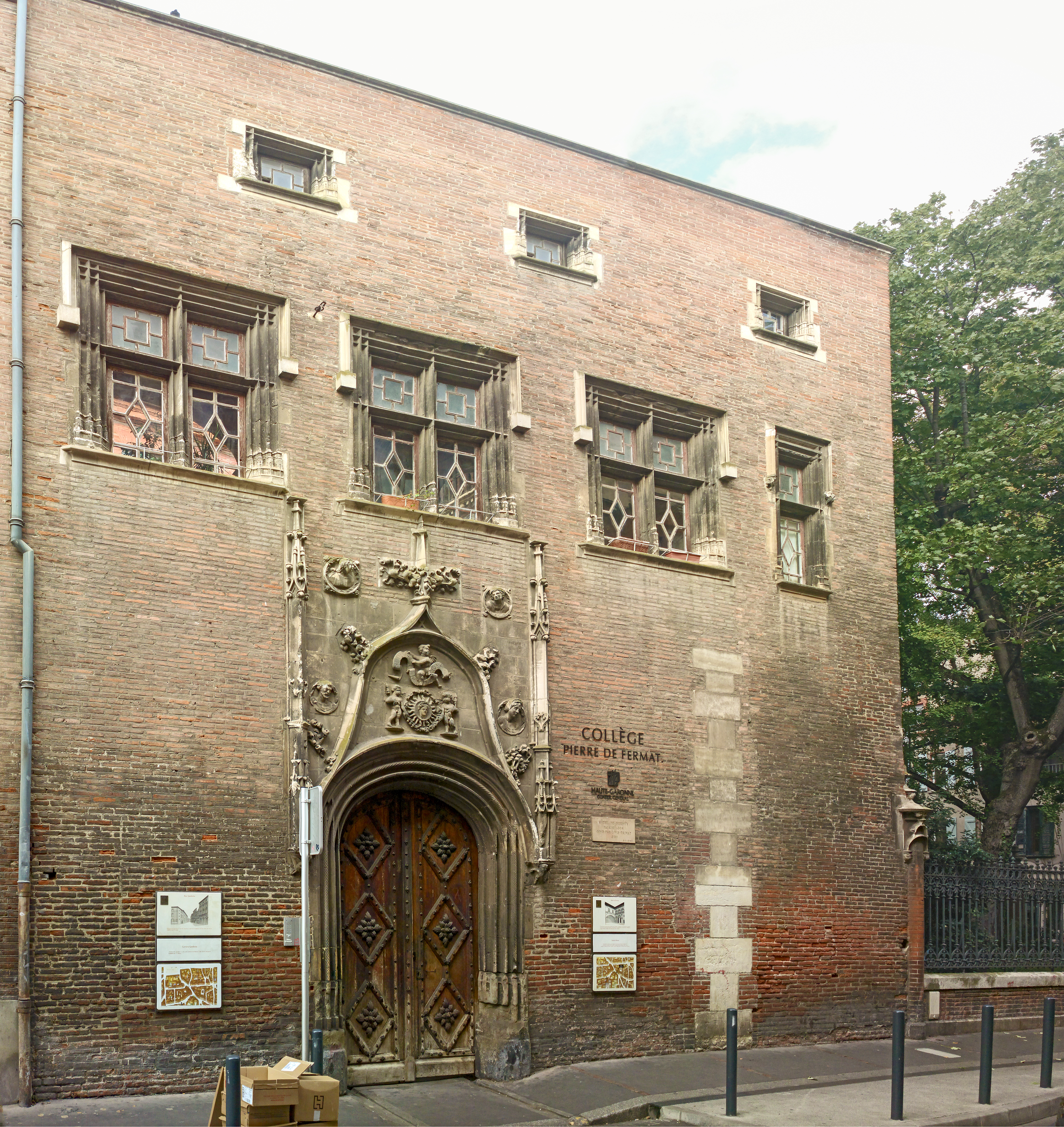
- Facade of the Hôtel de Bernuy

- Location within France
- 43.6028°N 1.4411°E
- Type: Hôtel particulier
- Location: Rue Léon Gambetta, Toulouse, France

History
- Built: 1503–36
- Built for: Jean de Bernuy

Site notes
- Architect: Nicolas Bachelier
- Architectural styles: Renaissance, Gothic, Plateresque
- Current use: Collège Pierre-de-Fermat
- Owner: Toulouse Métropole

Monument historique
- Designated: 1889
- Reference no.: PA00094533

The Hôtel de Bernuy (Occitan: Ostal de Bernuy) in rue Léon Gambetta, Toulouse, France, is a Renaissance hôtel particulier (palace) of the 16th century built by the mason Louis Privat for the wealthy woad merchant, Jean de Bernuy. This townhouse is considered a magnificent example of the introduction of the Renaissance in Toulouse and a symbol of the city's affluence.

== History ==
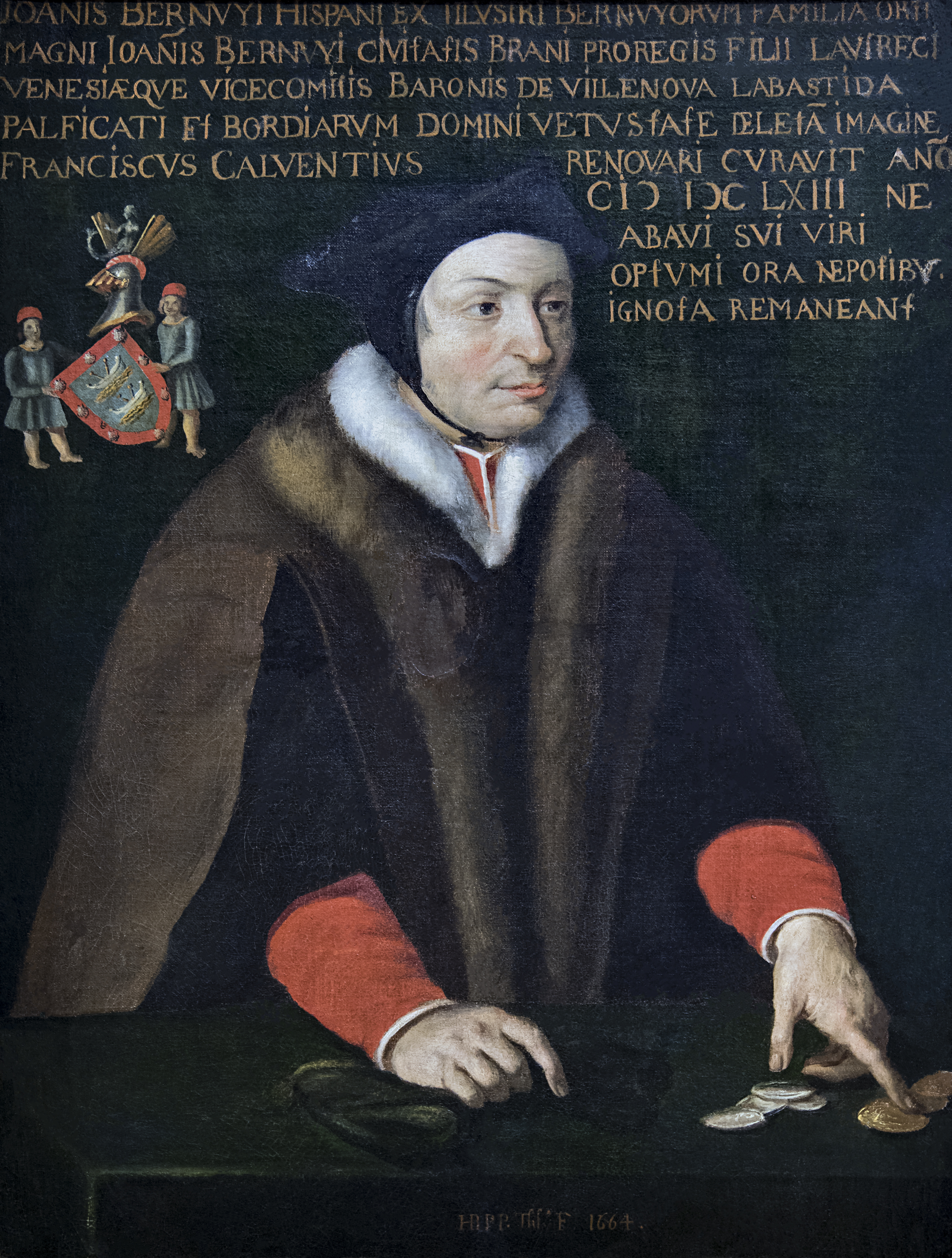
Portrait of Jean de Bernuy

The facade of Hôtel de Bernuy was built between 1503 and 1504, so was the gothic brick courtyard and its tower. The Renaissance stone courtyard was constructed from 1530 to 1536. The owner was a rich woad merchant, Jean de Bernuy, a Spanish Jew who had fled the inquisition and was credit-worthy enough to be the main guarantor of the ransomed King Francis I of France after his capture at the Battle of Pavia by Charles V of Spain.

It is an original example of Renaissance palaces architecture of Toulouse, with a stone decoration of the cour d'honneur (courtyard) influenced by Spanish Plateresque. The use of brick in the gothic courtyard is typical of Toulouse, while the use of stone in the Renaissance courtyard is rare and indicates the wealth of the owner.

== The gothic courtyard and its staircase tower ==
The attention of Bernuy first focused on the back of his plot where his shops stood, and on a small gothic courtyard where he had built in 1504 a great staircase tower. Bernuy wanted his tower to be as high as his father-in-law's, the prosecutor Arnaud du Faur. Raising a tower towards the heavens was prestigious; decorating it with stone and bestowing upon it the marks of a mediaeval feudal lord, even more so. The windows of the tower have been 'bent', that indicates the skill of the stonemason Merigo Cayla.

Pictures of the gothic courtyard and its tower

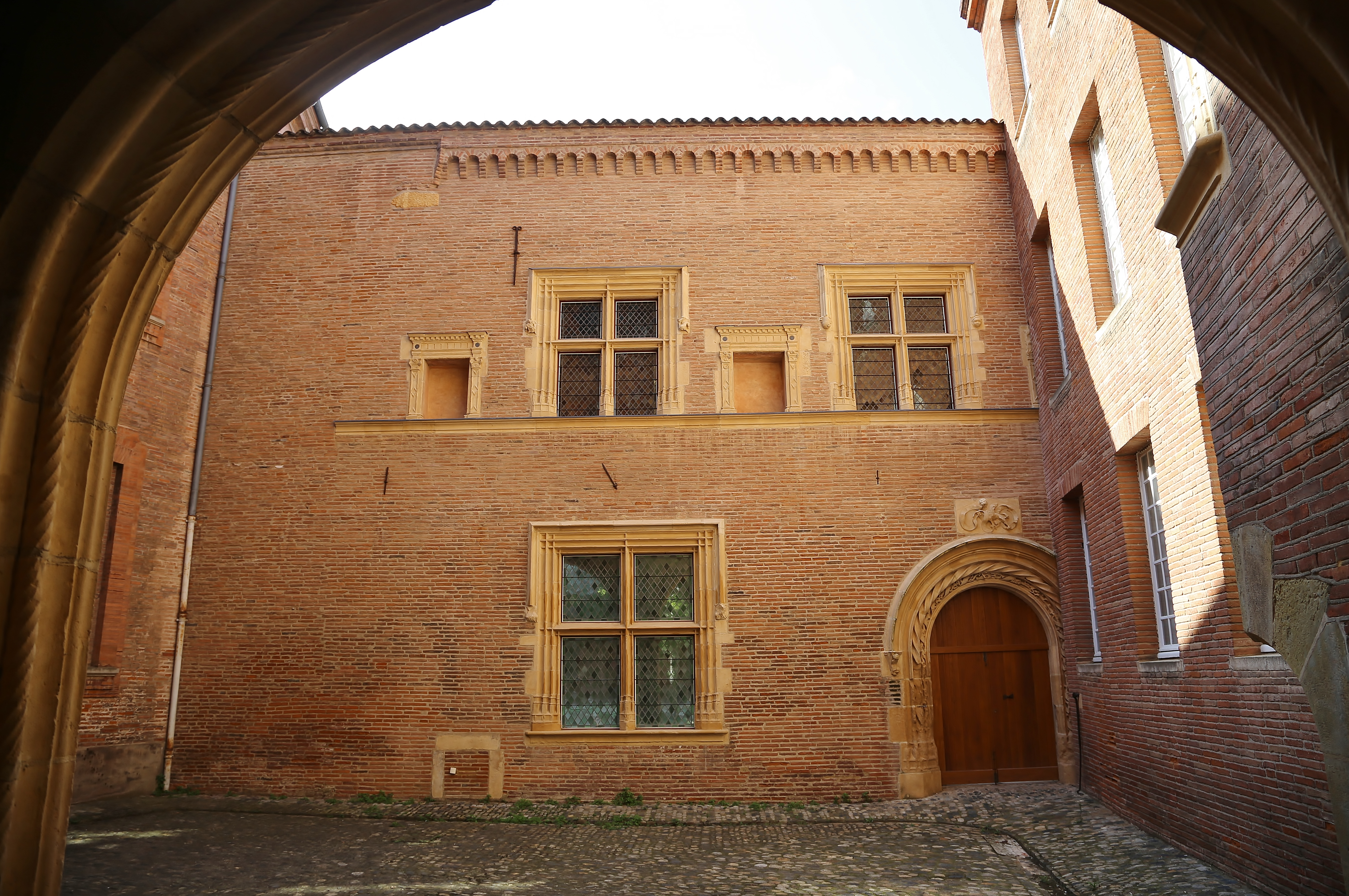
The gothic courtyard

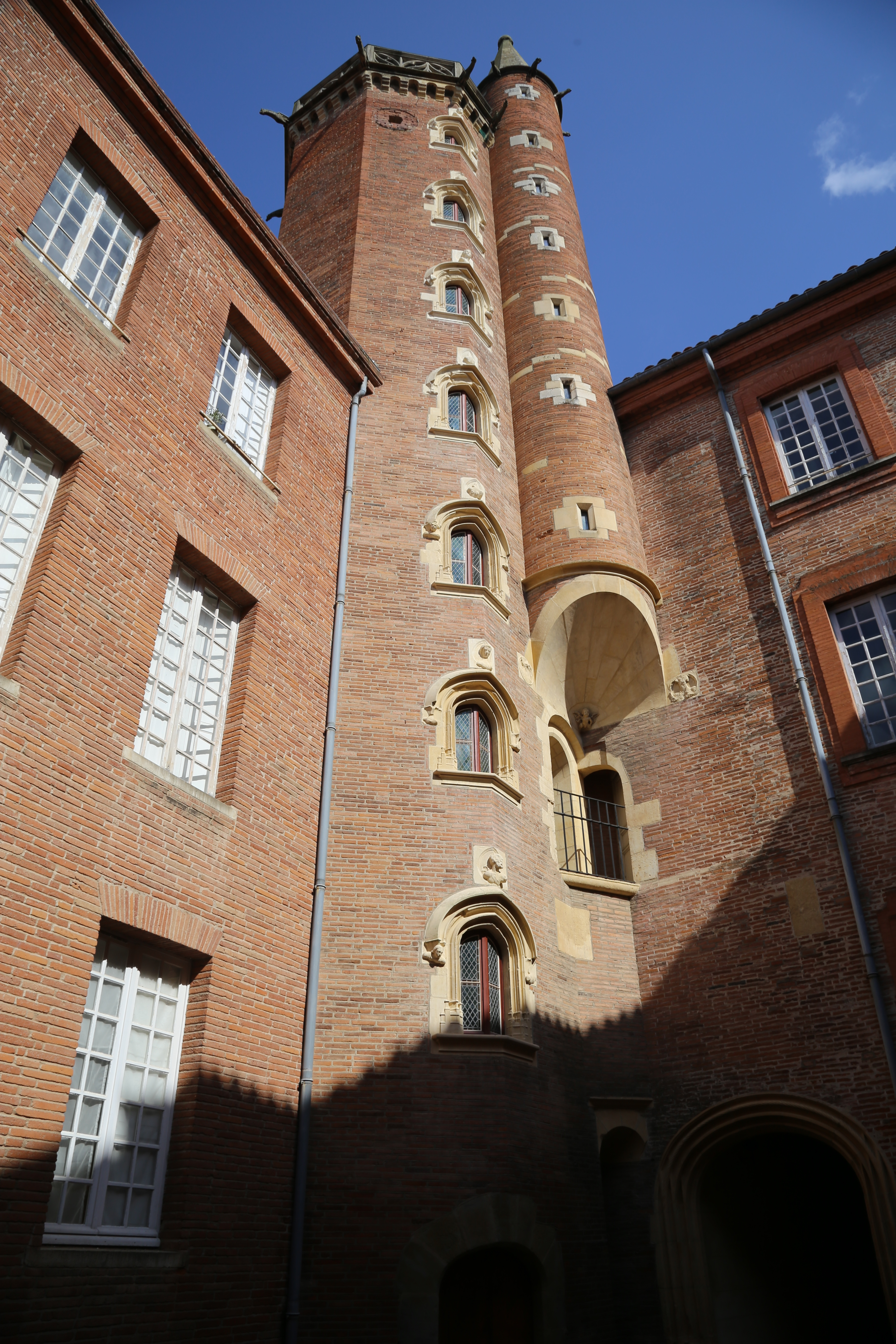
The gothic tower

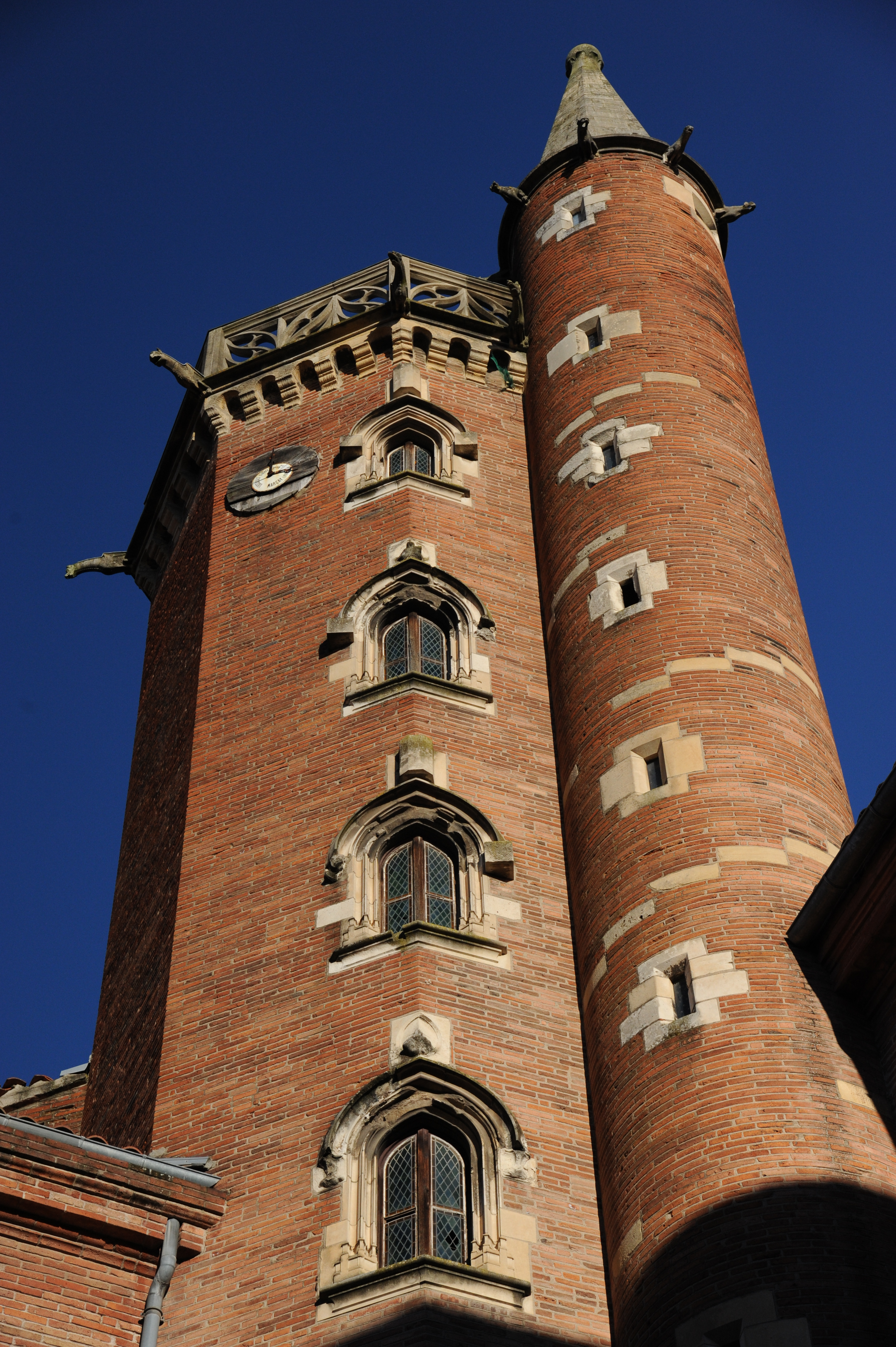
The top of the tower

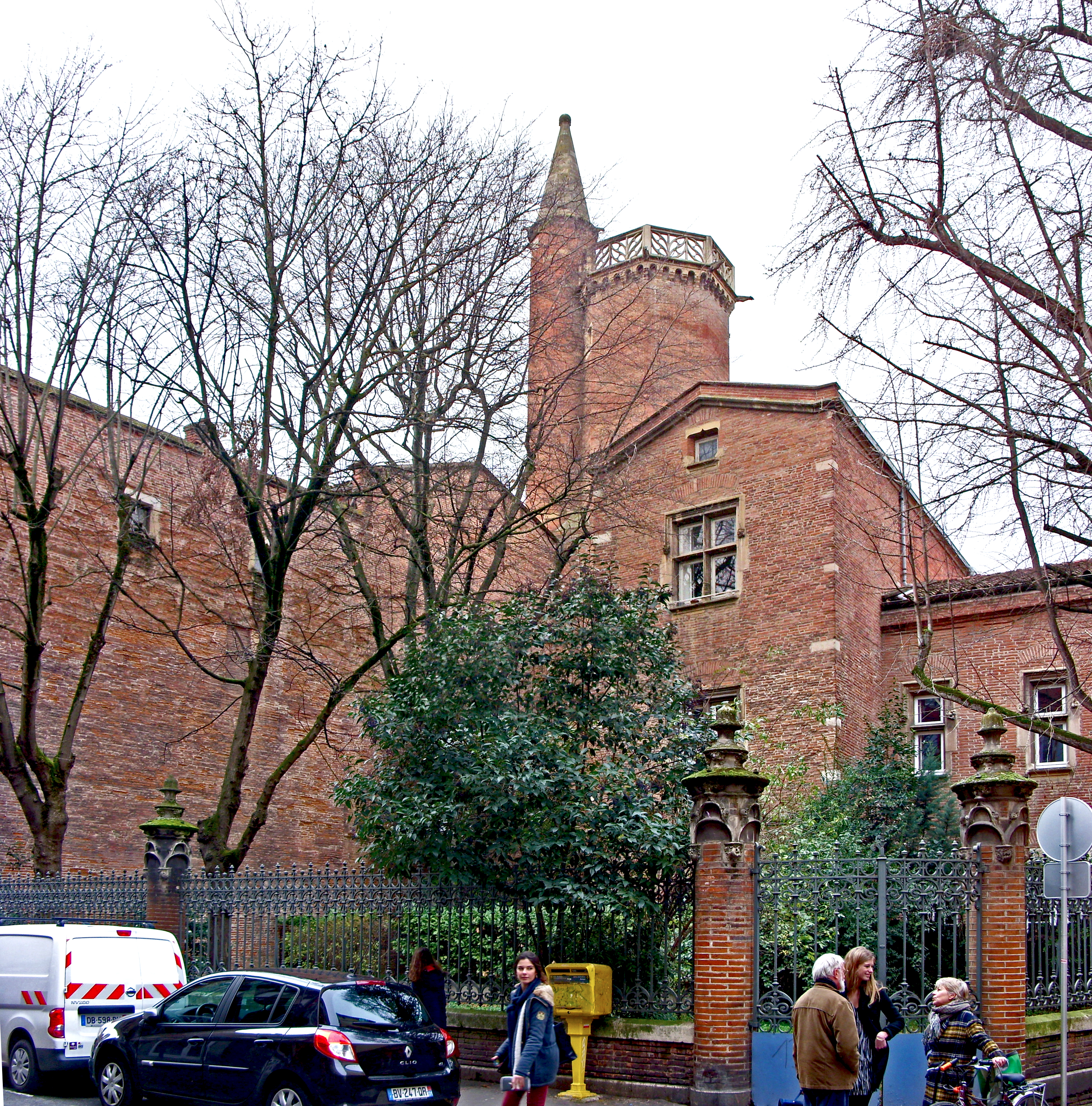
Tower view from the street

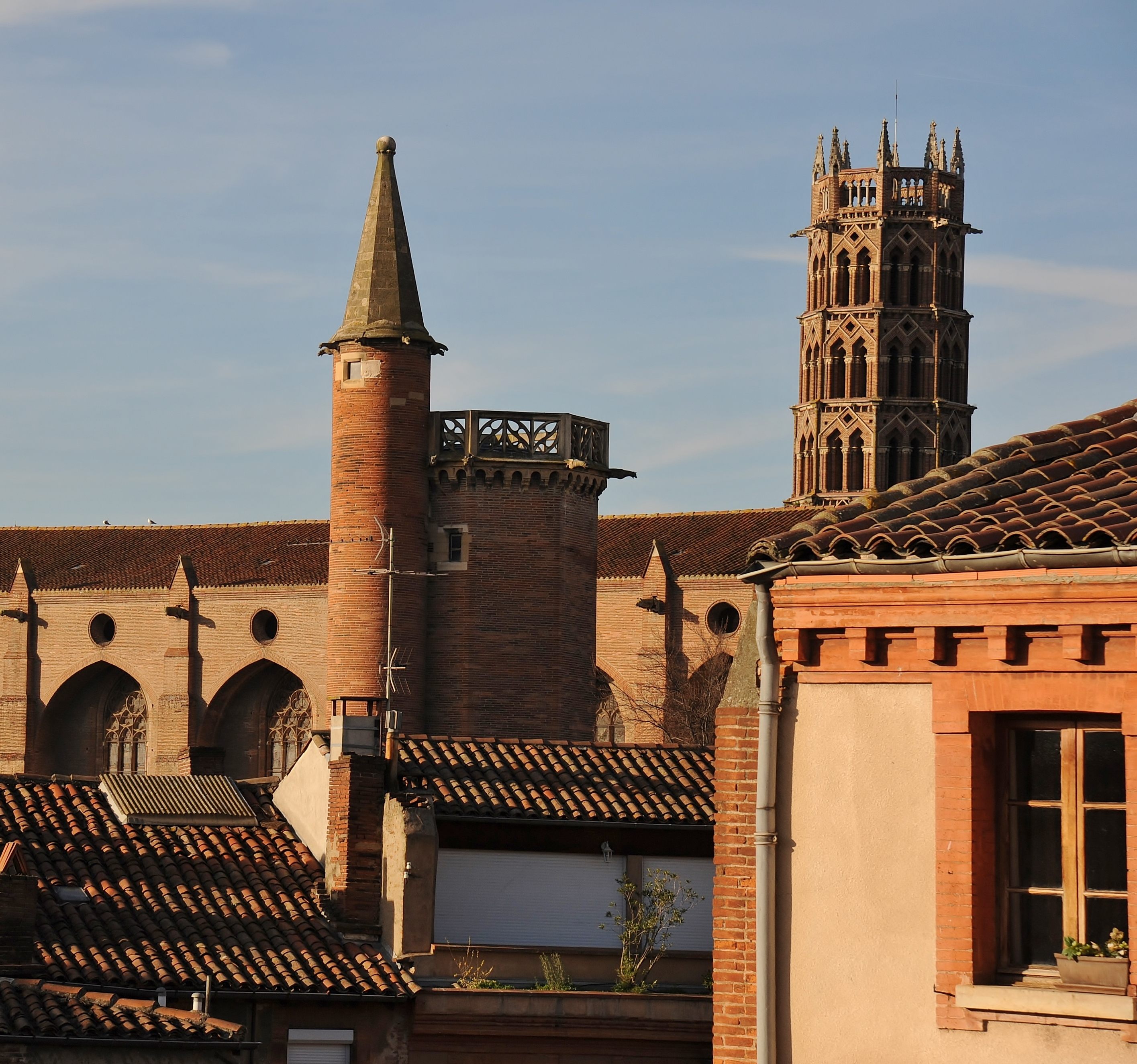
Bernuy's tower above the roofs

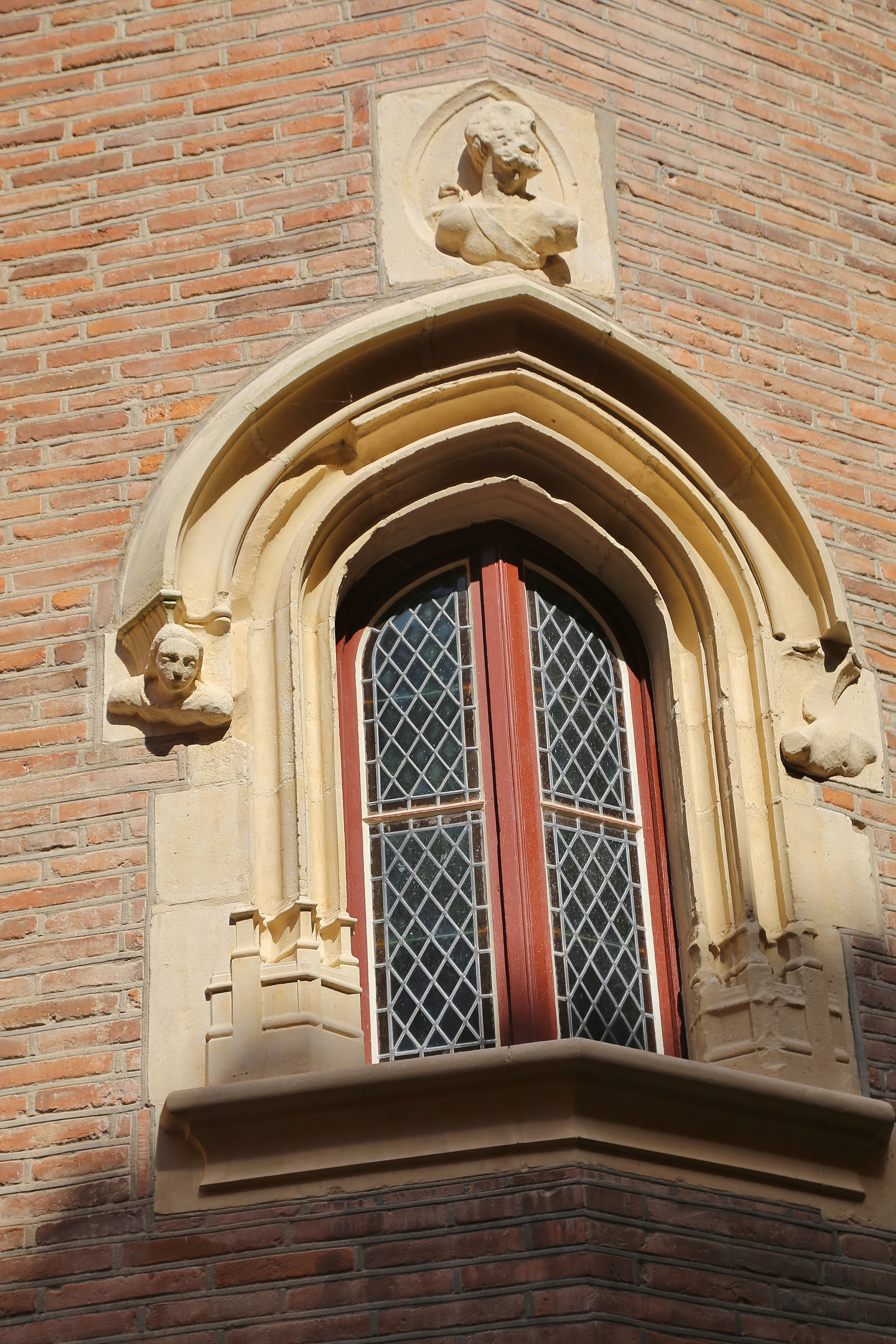
Window of the tower

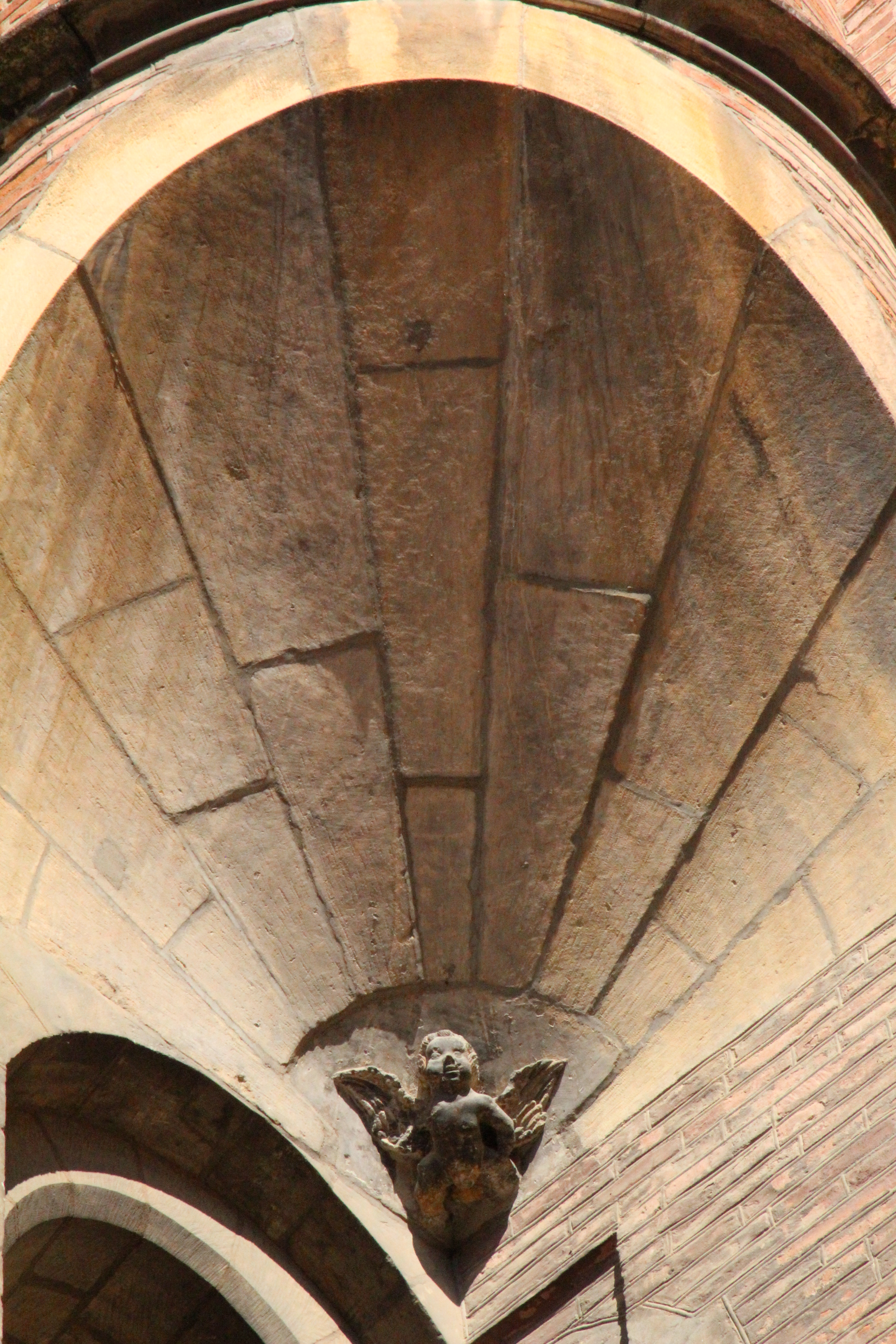
Turret base

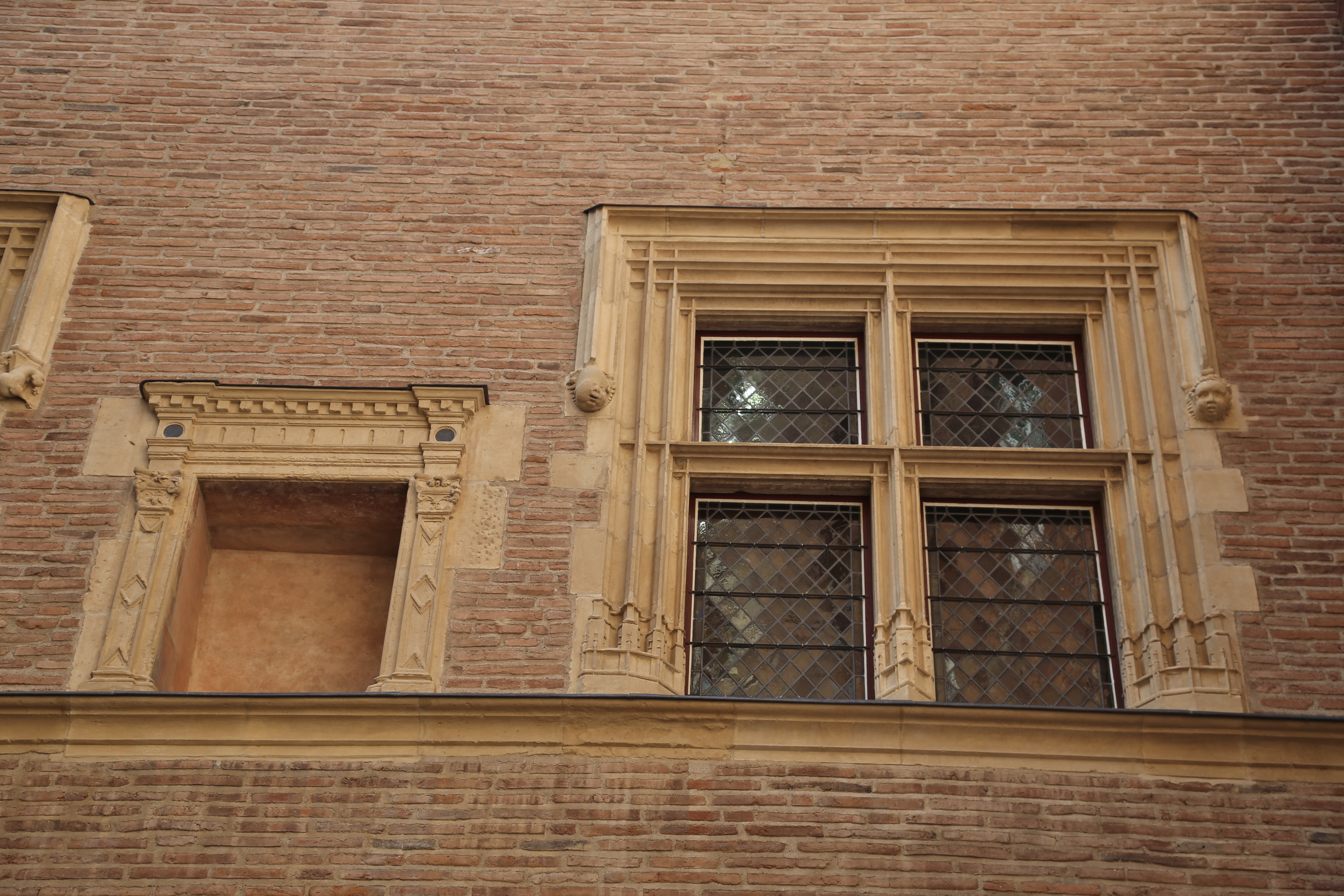
Windows

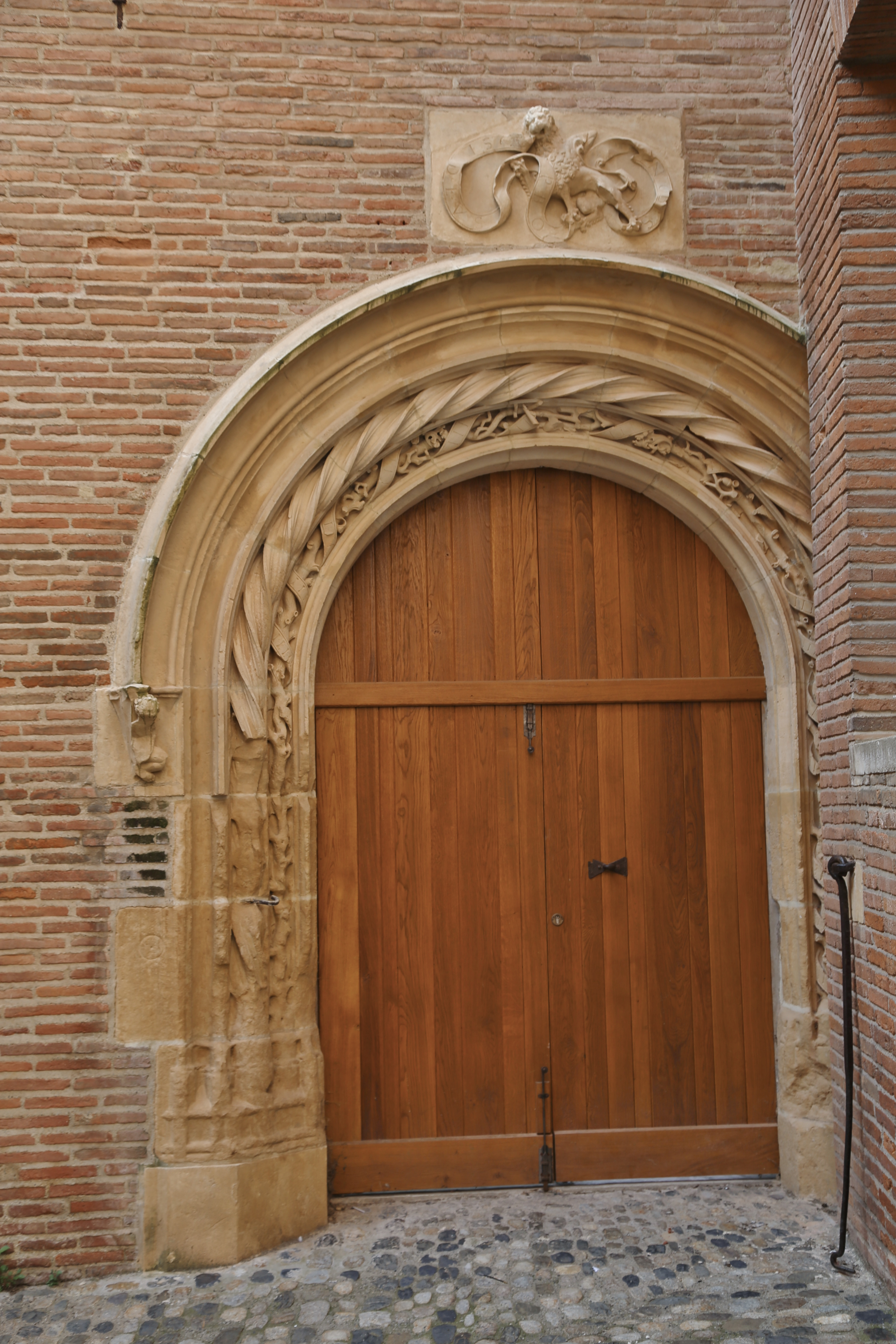
Door

== The main gate ==
In 1504 Merigo Cayla was commissioned to build the main gate. Crowned with an ogee arch decorated with cabbage leaf and bordered with pinnacles, the gate conforms to the fashion of the period: flamboyant gothic. When Bernuy started to undertake his grand Renaissance courtyard, he instructed the architect Louis Privat to move this gate to rue Gambetta and to bring it up. Privat duly inserted into the brick wall several sculpted ornaments typical of the Renaissance: putti bearing the owner's motto and arms, and portraits medallions. The coexistence of the two styles (gothic and Renaissance) was frequent at that time. It had the advantage of combining prestigious ornaments, both traditional and innovative.

Pictures of the main gate

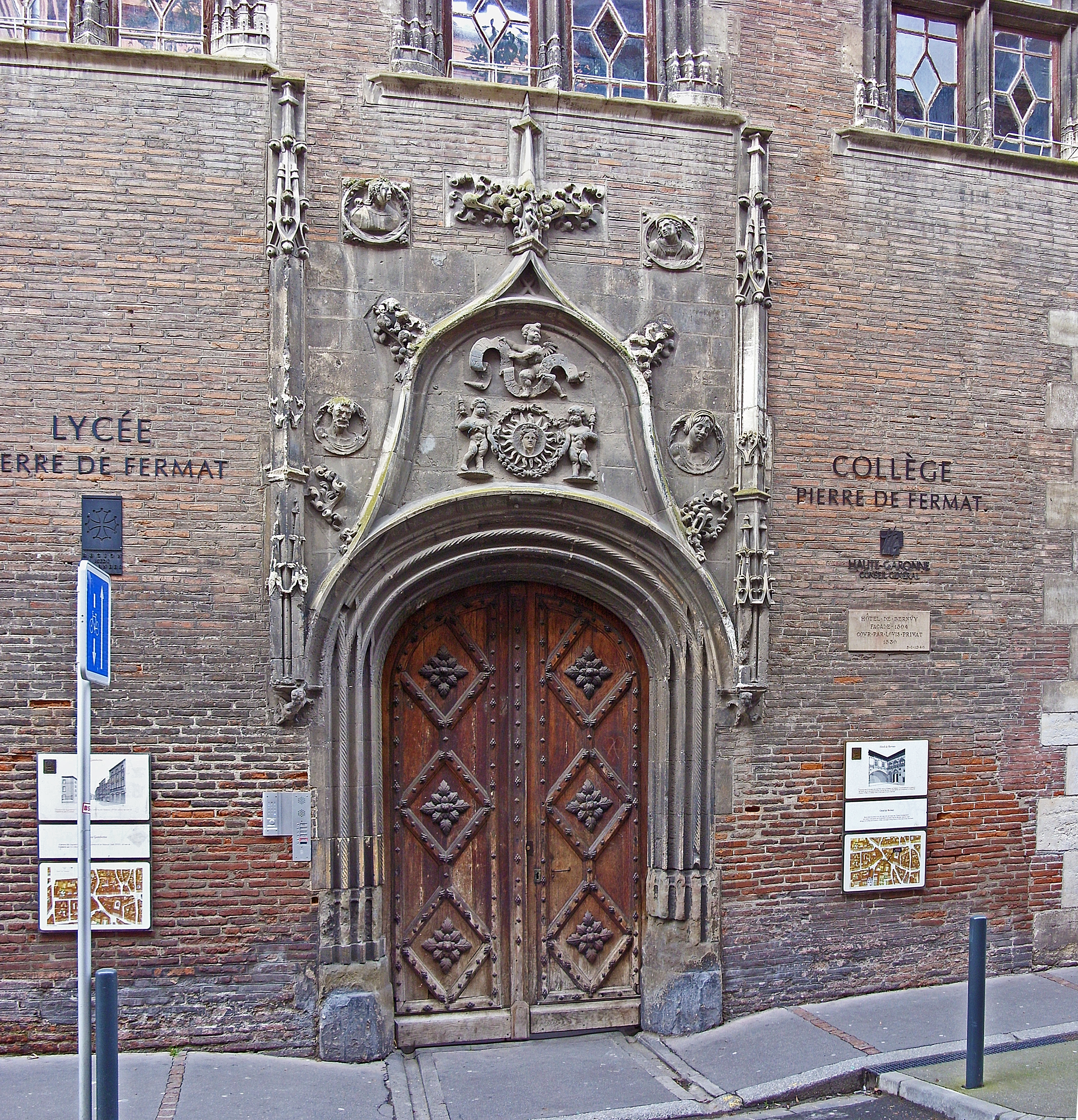
The portal

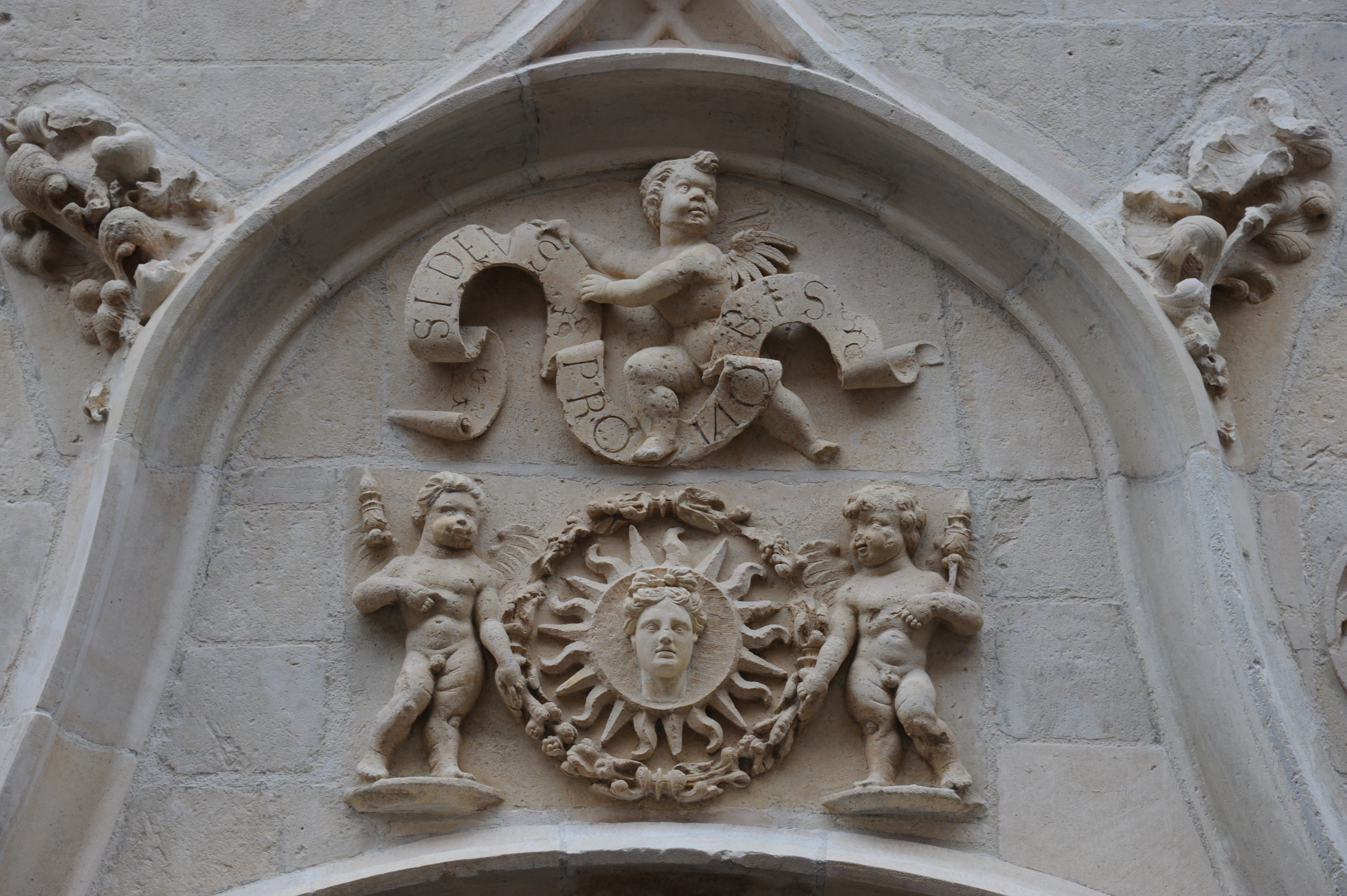
Portal detail

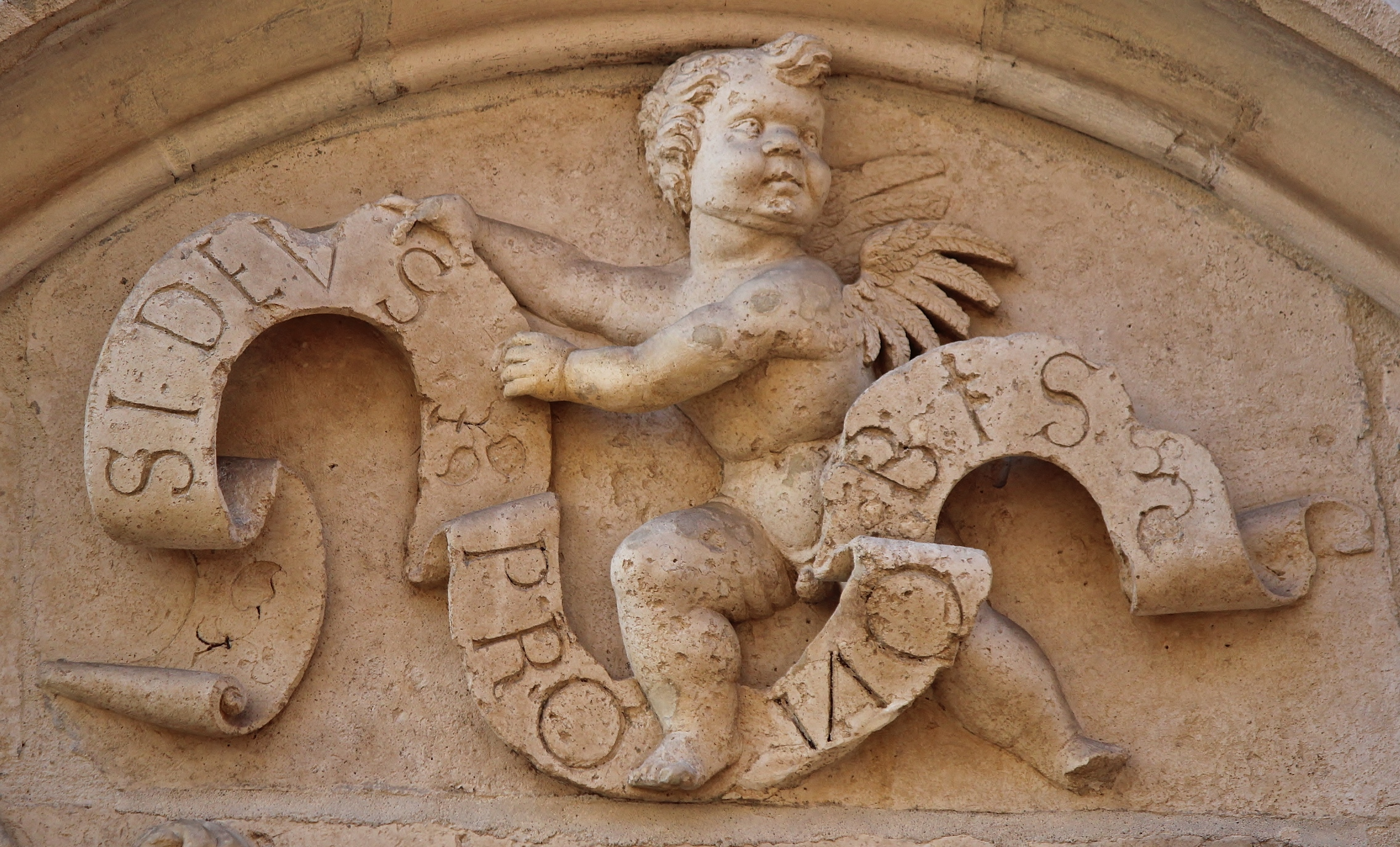
Motto: SI DEUS PRO NOBIS

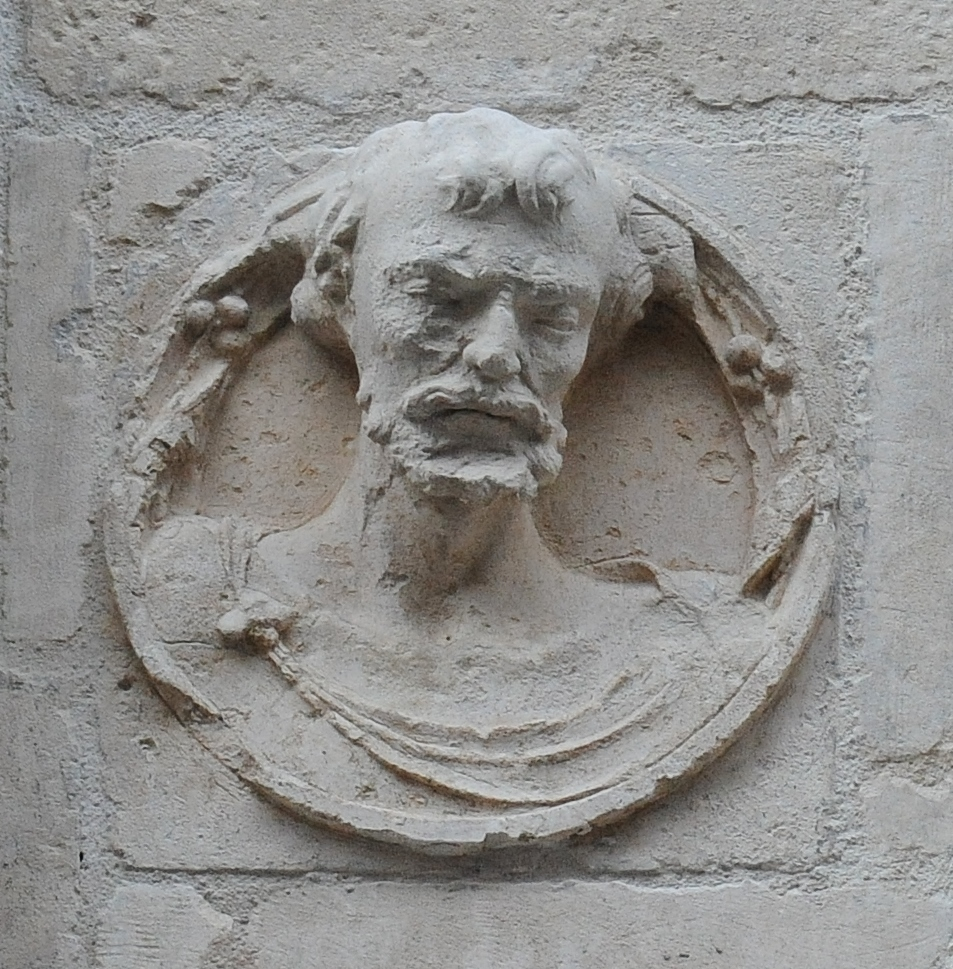
Renaissance medallion

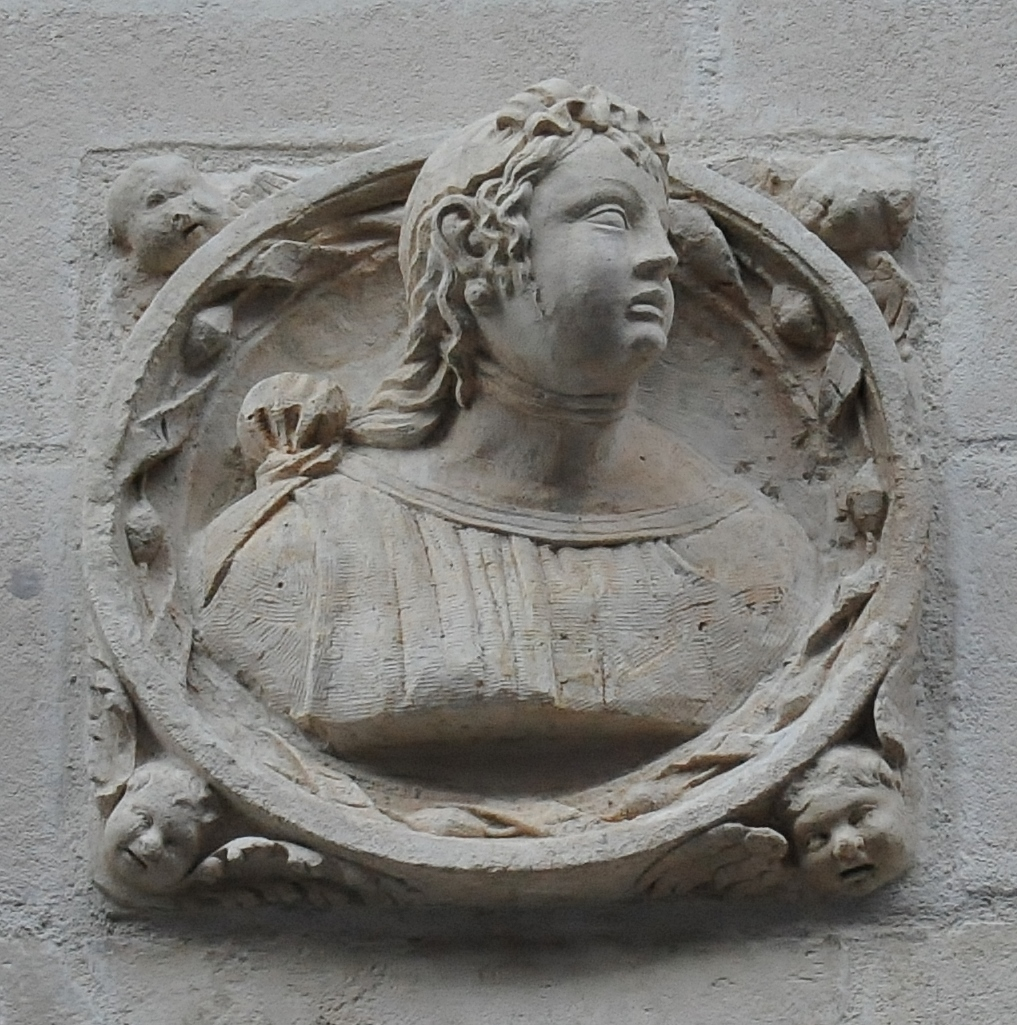
Renaissance medallion

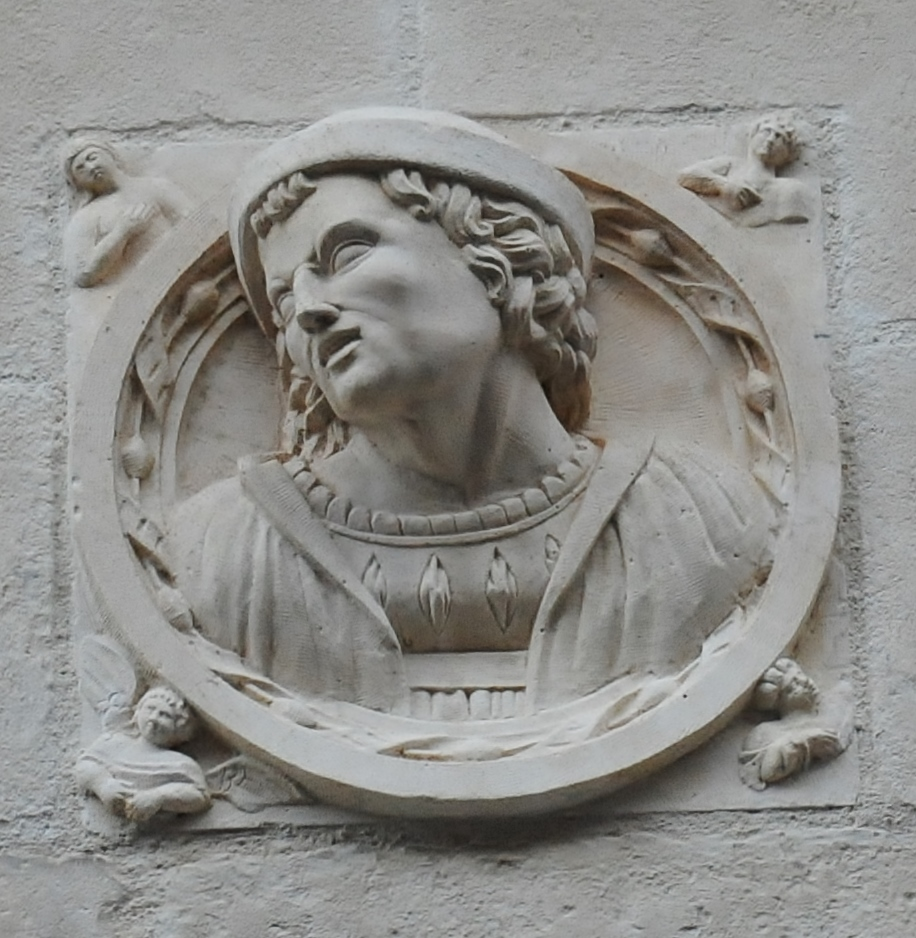
Renaissance medallion

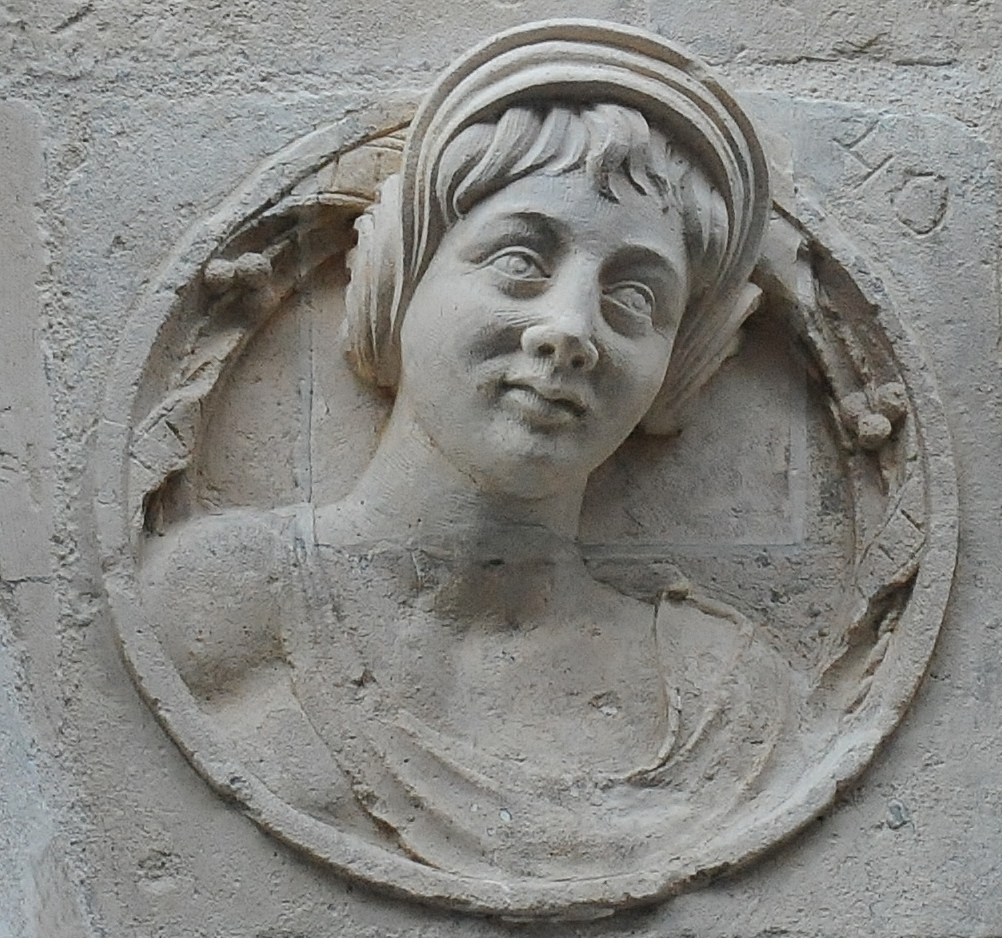
Renaissance medallion

== The Renaissance courtyard ==
Circa 1530, Bernuy asked to architect Louis Privat to separate the personal and professional parts of his hôtel. From 1530 to 1536 he built a new courtyard on rue Gambetta in which he gave free rein to the vocabulary of the Renaissance. The portrait medallions of the owners, shown holding phylacteries (scrolls), seem to welcome the visitors. Tall and powerful candelabra columns punctuating the arcades confer a great sense of monumentality to the courtyard. The upper gallery, supported by the great surbased arch, has windows that feature Corinthian columns, a first in Toulouse. Their design came from a treatise on architecture. The abundant use of stone, unheard of at the time in Toulouse, demonstrated the wealth of the owner.

Considering its ambitious design and extravagant dimensions, the great arch must be the most extraordinary feature of this courtyard. Its unique character also comes from the bespoke treatment of each of the coffers. Their partitions, along with the hanging roses between them, ignore the curve of the arch and are instead perfectly vertical, an effect that must have made the stonemason's work considerably more difficult.

Pictures of the Renaissance courtyard

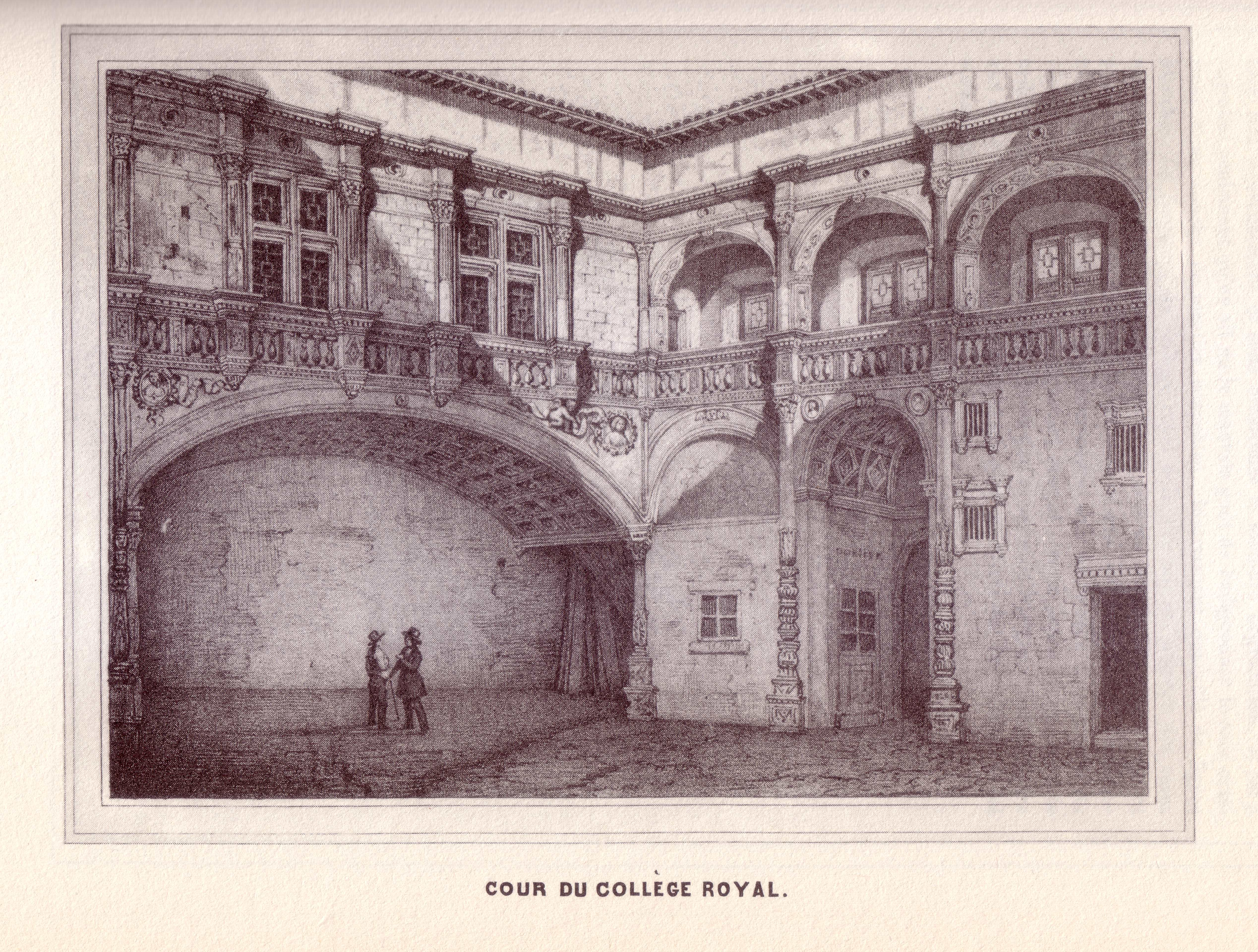
Drawing of the courtyard, 19th century

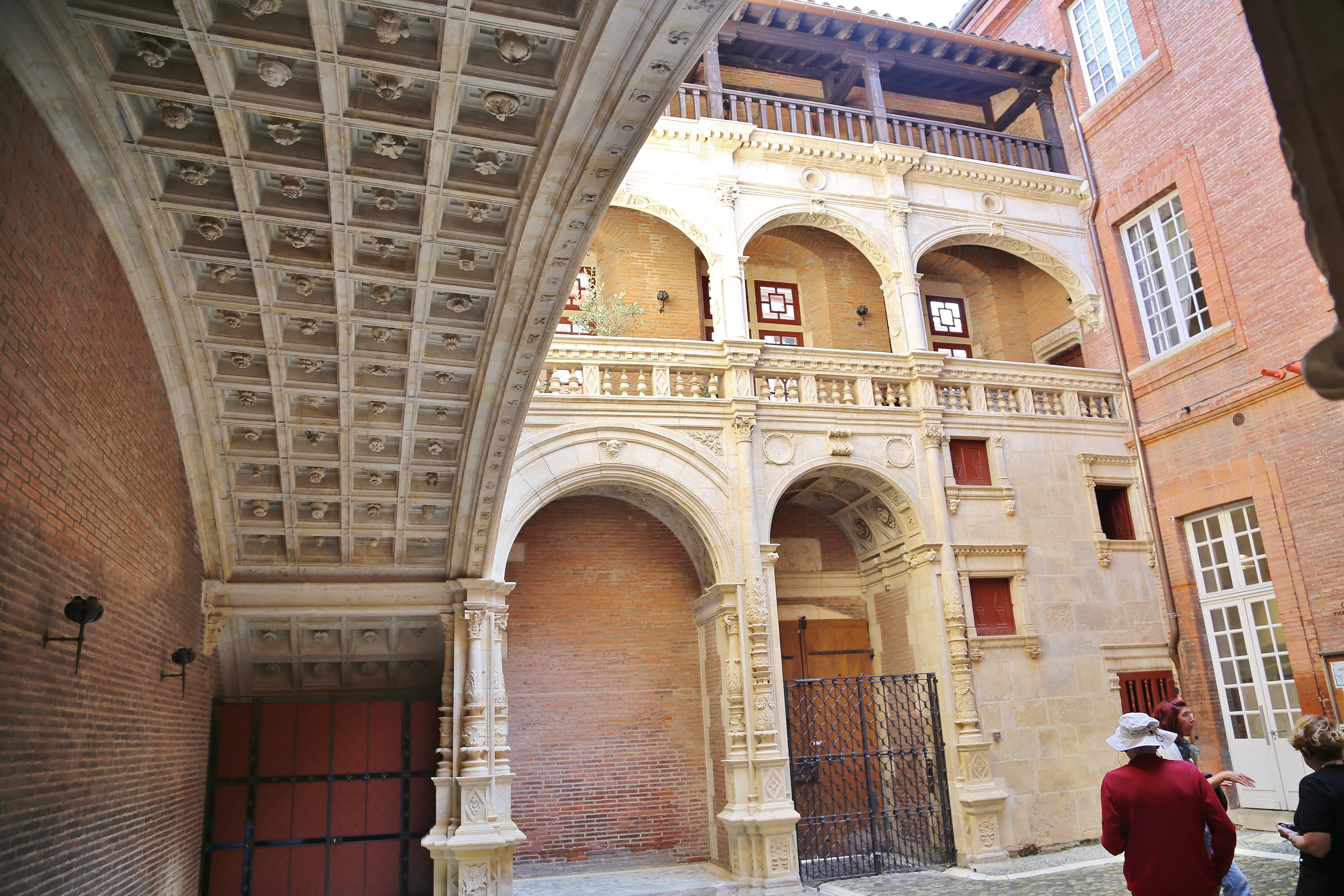
The Renaissance courtyard

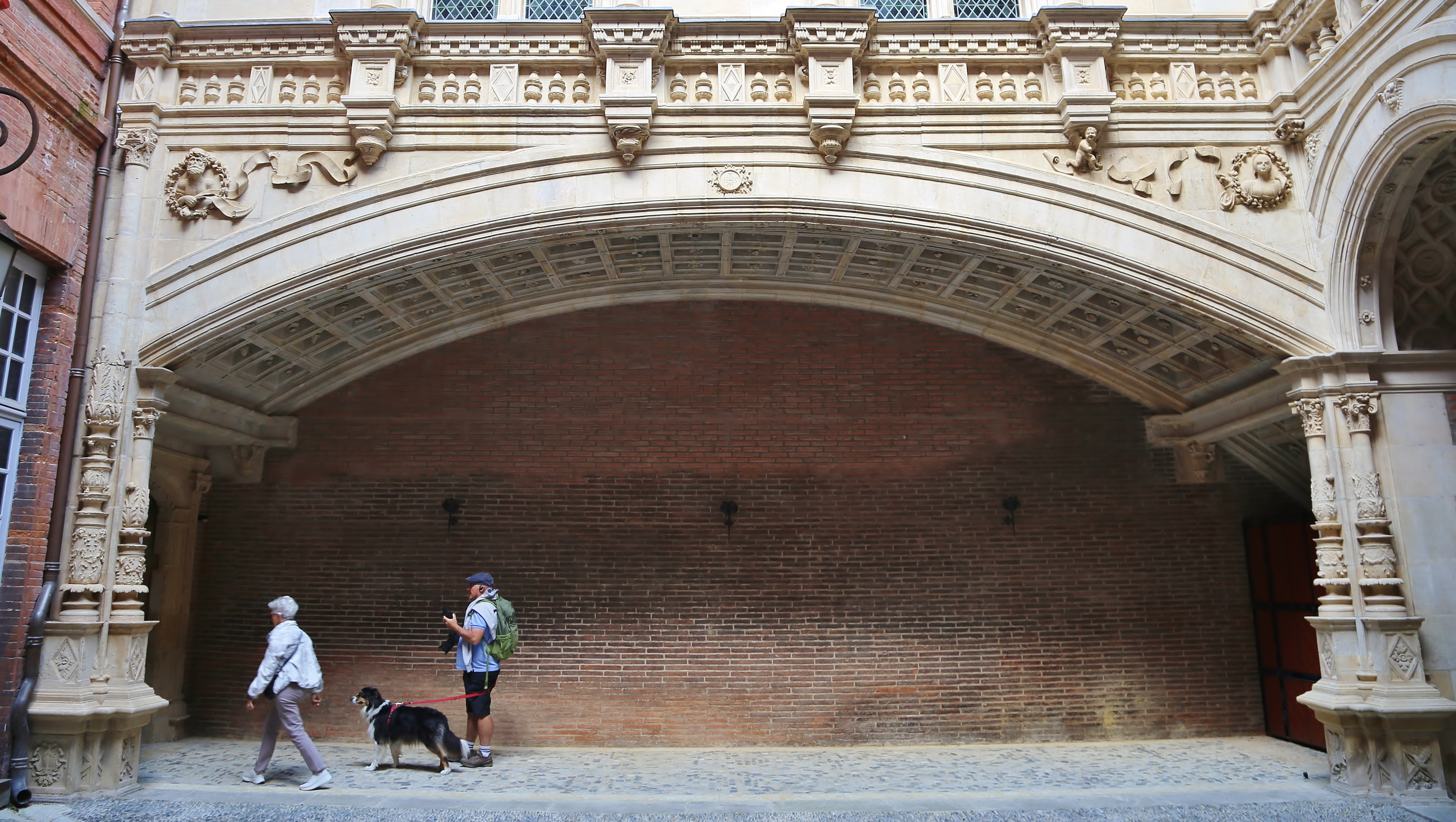
The great arch

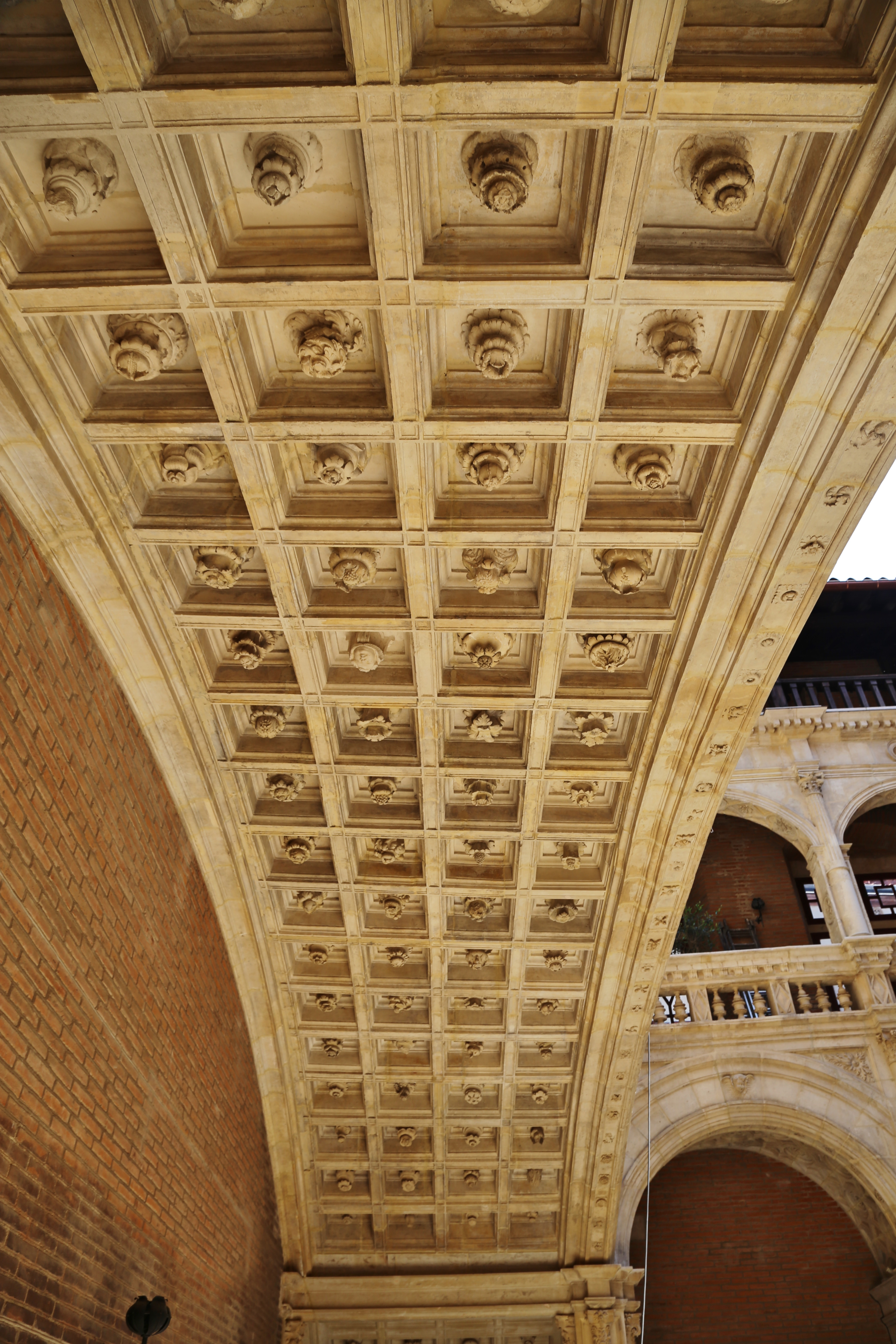
The coffers of the great arch

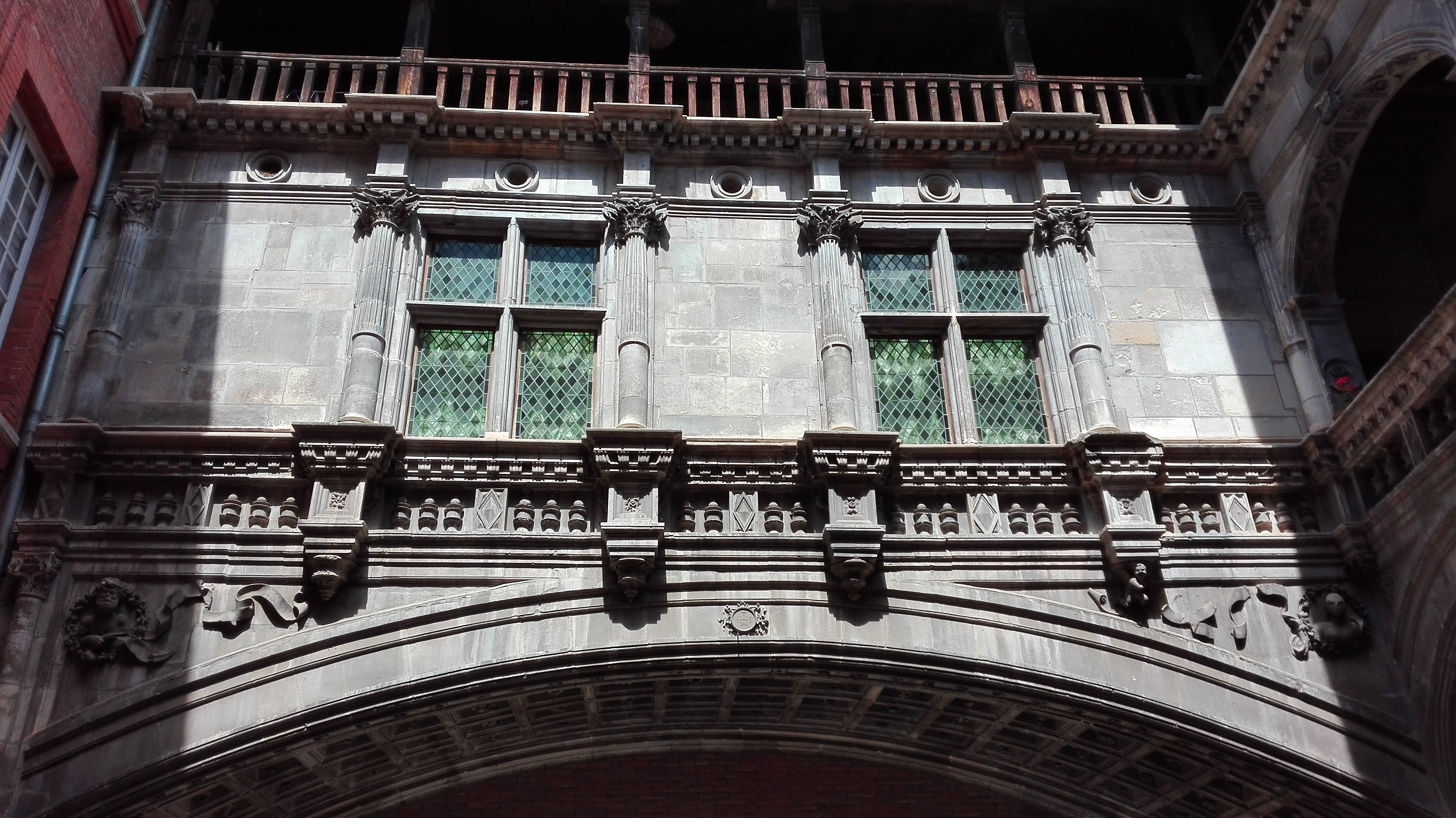
Upper gallery above the great arch

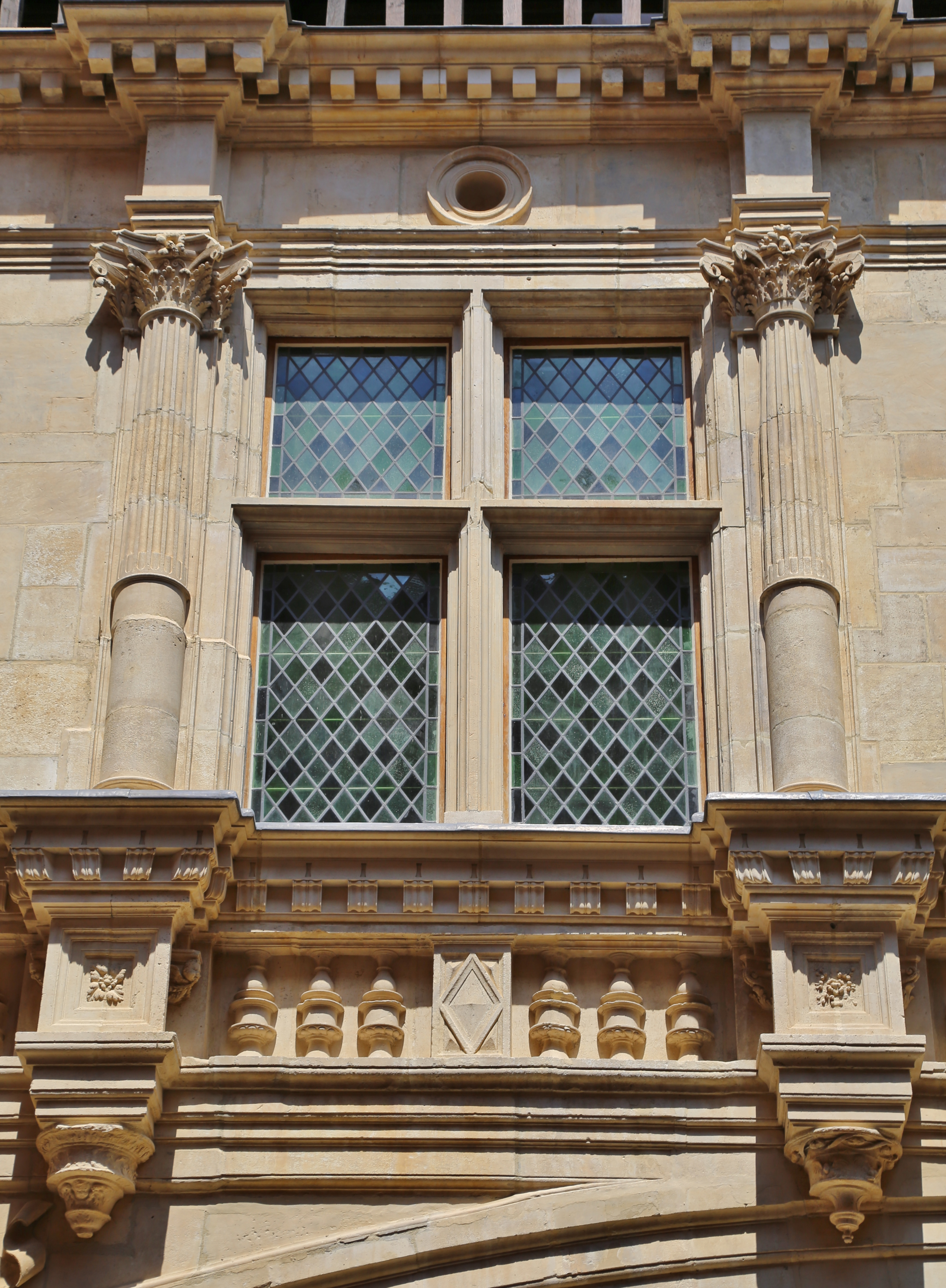
Window with Corinthian columns

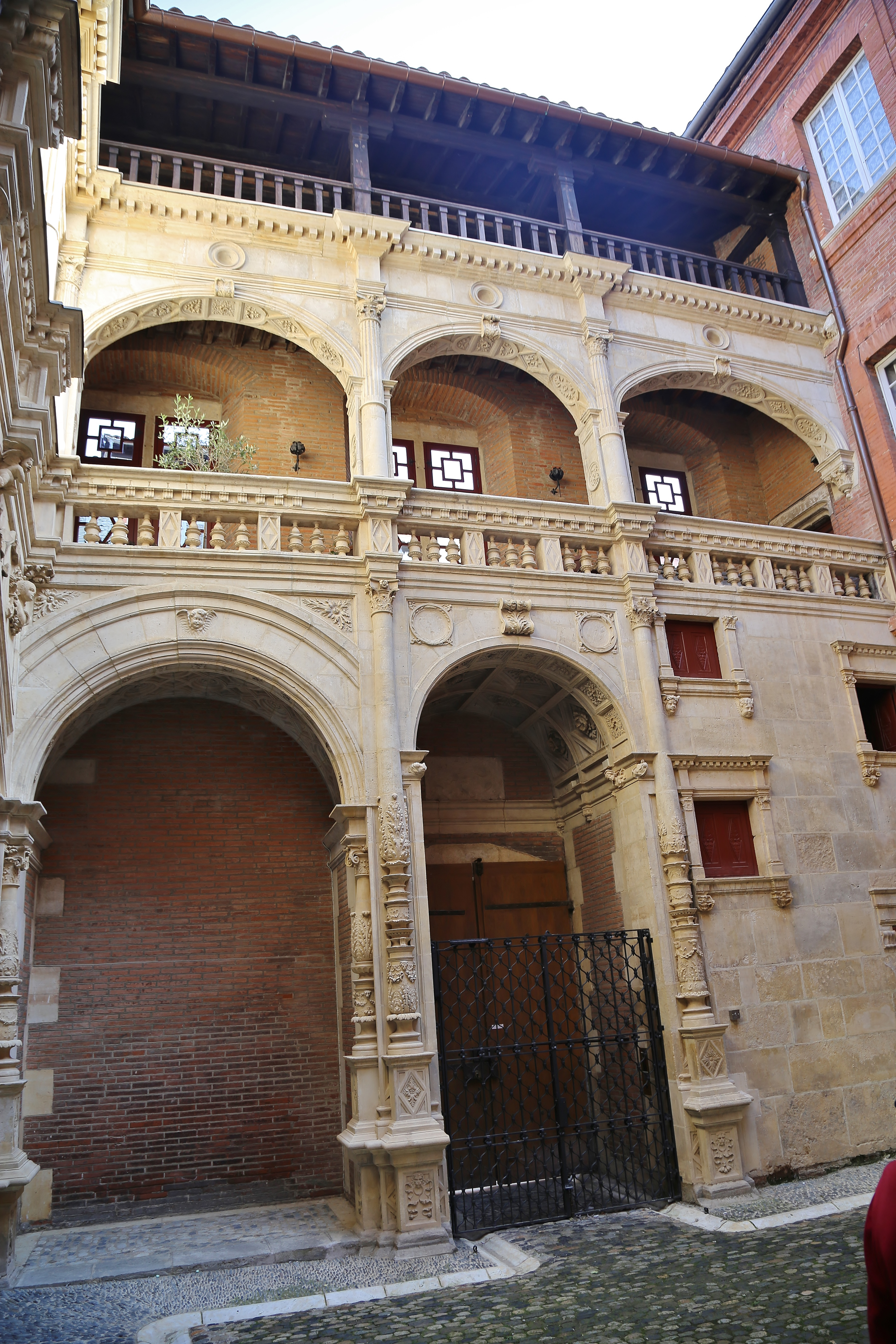
The gallery above the gate

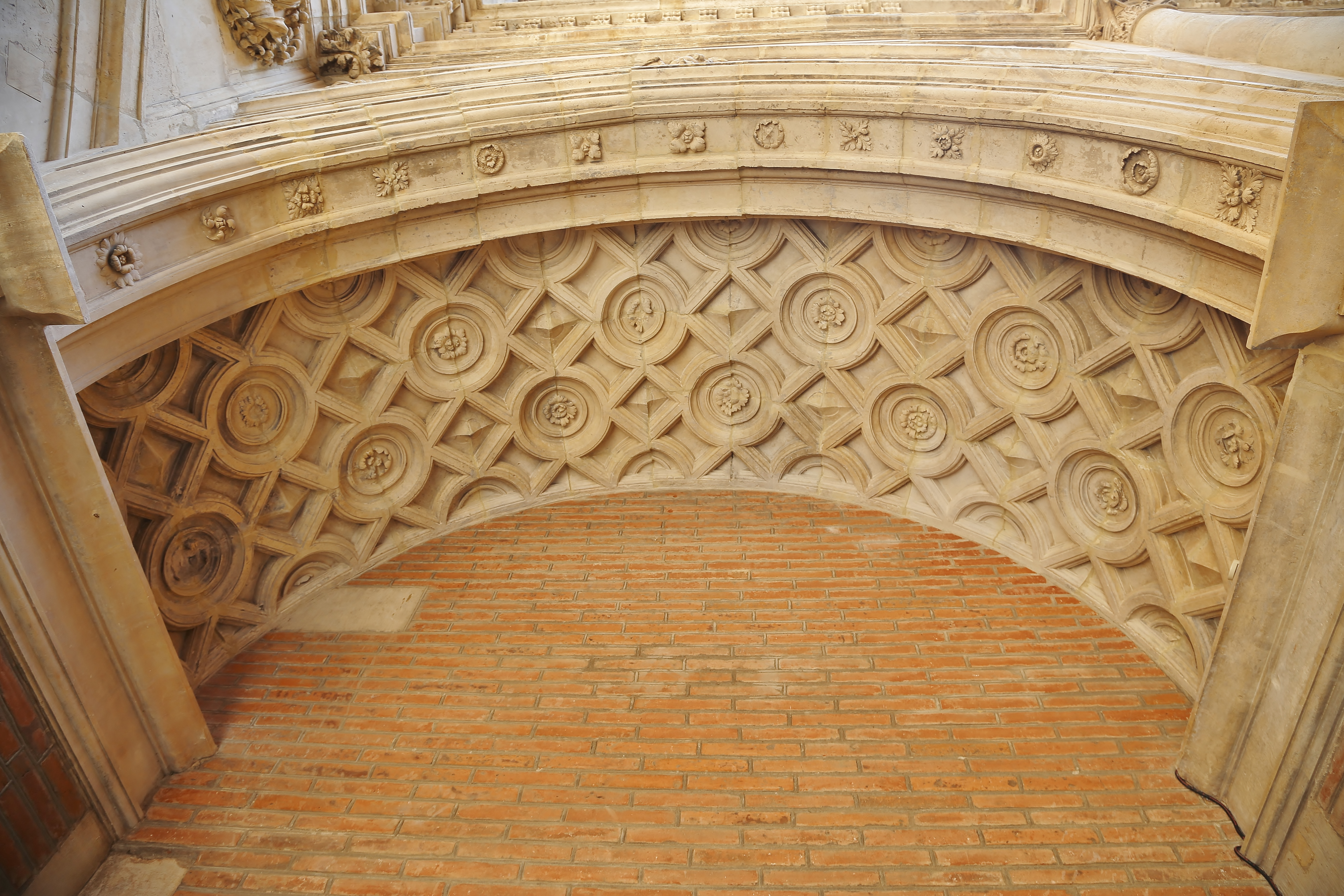
An arch above the gate

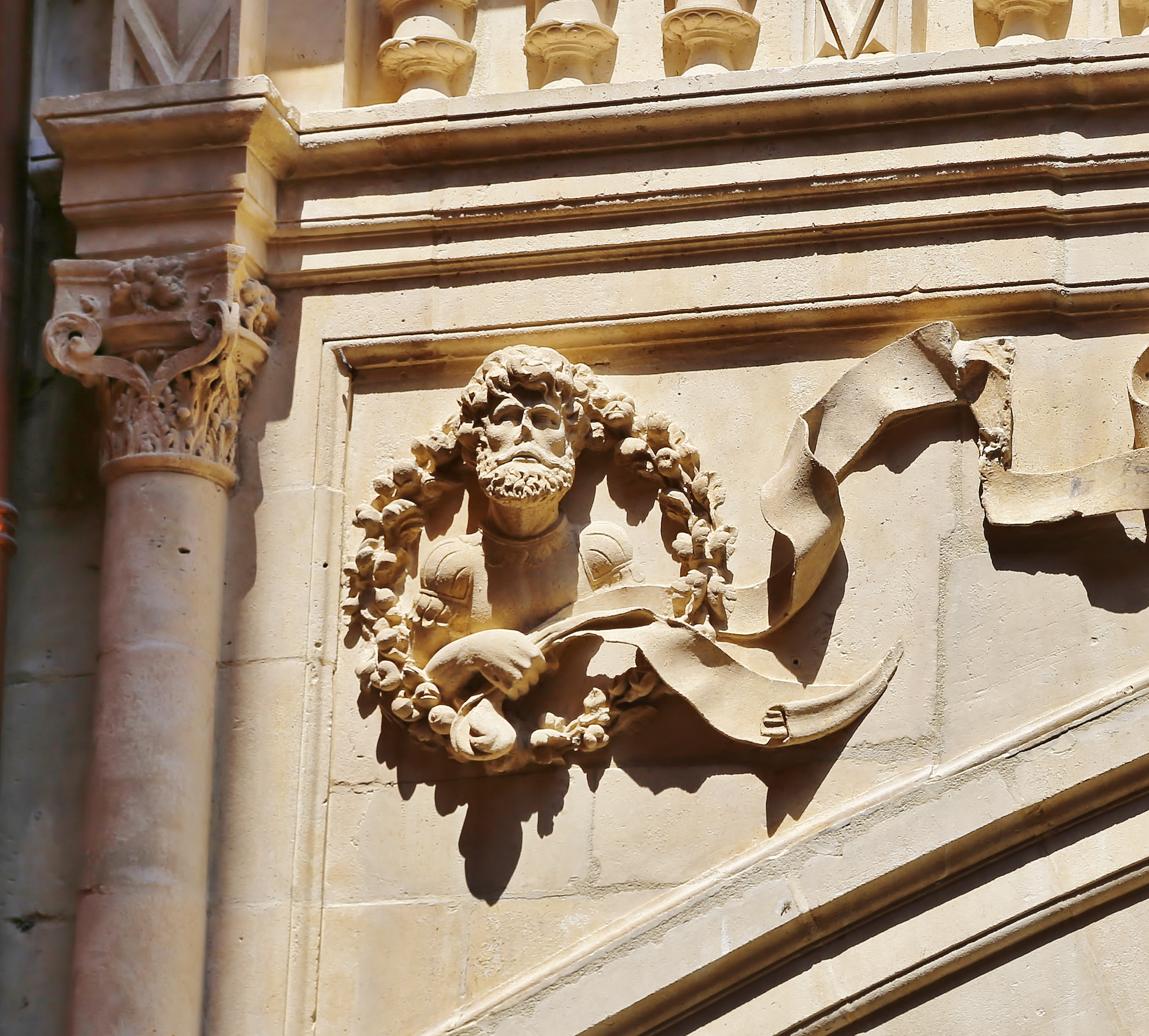
Medallion of Jean de Bernuy in the courtyard

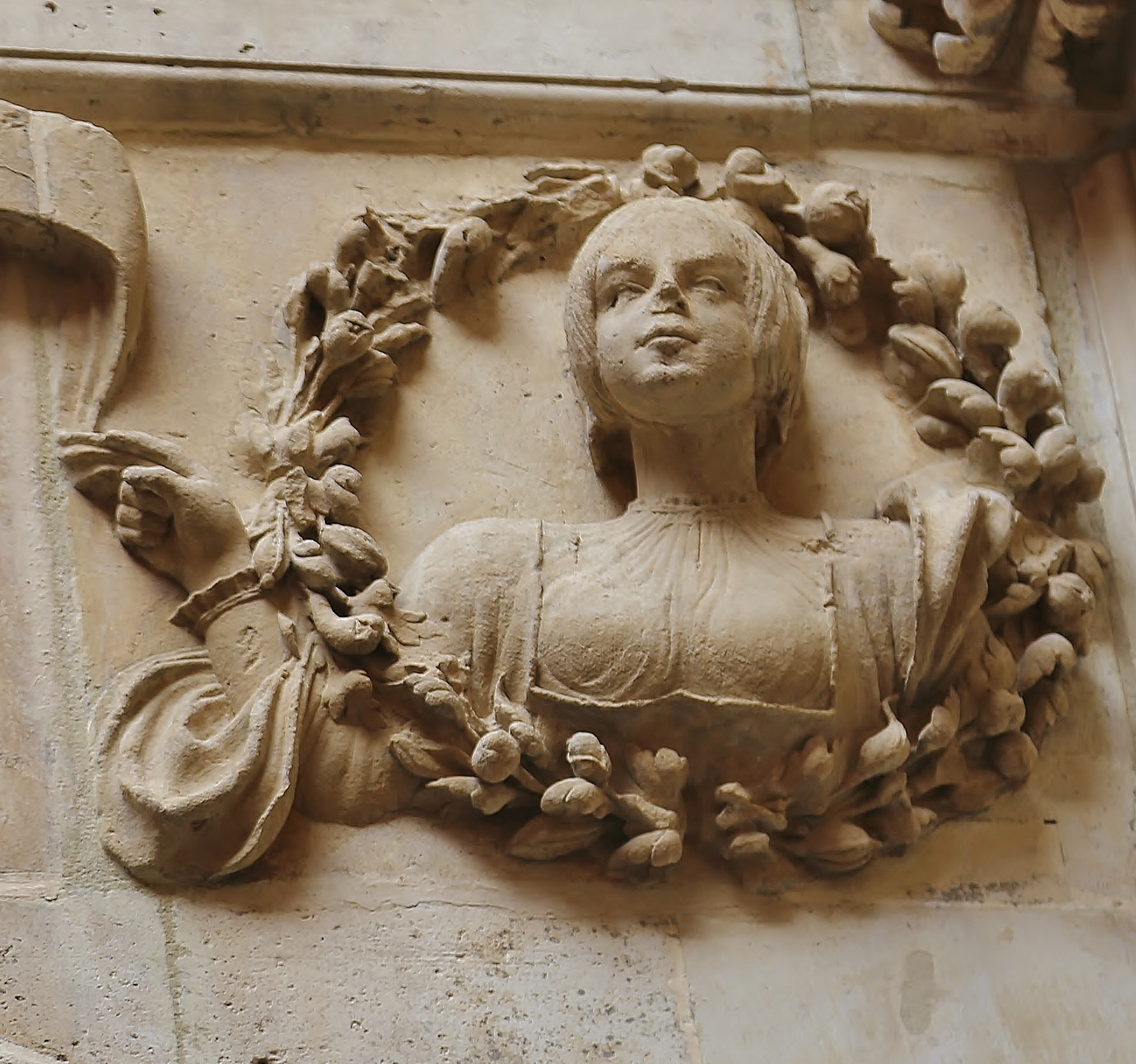
Medallion of Bernuy's wife in the courtyard

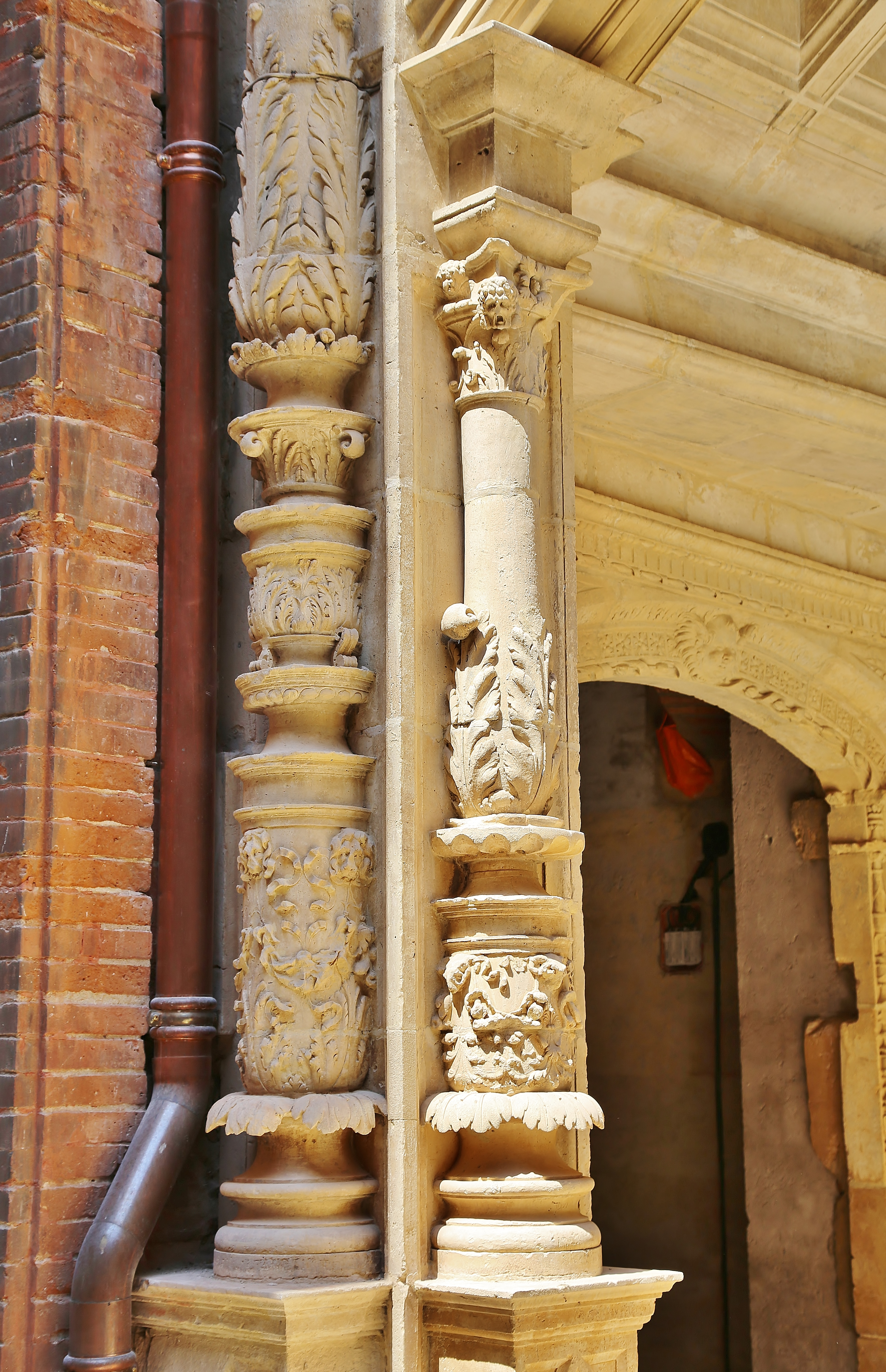
Candelabra columns

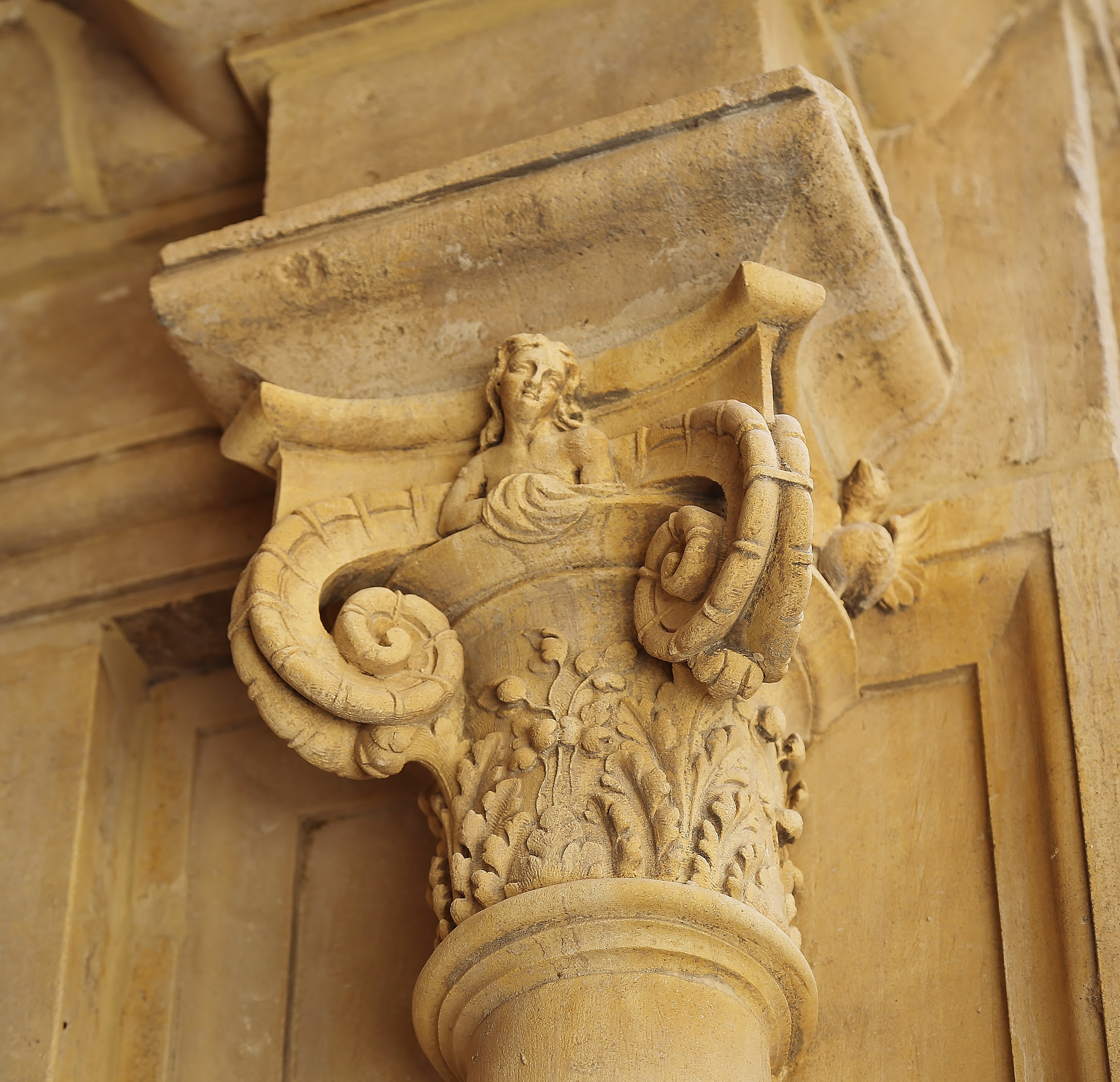
A capital of a column

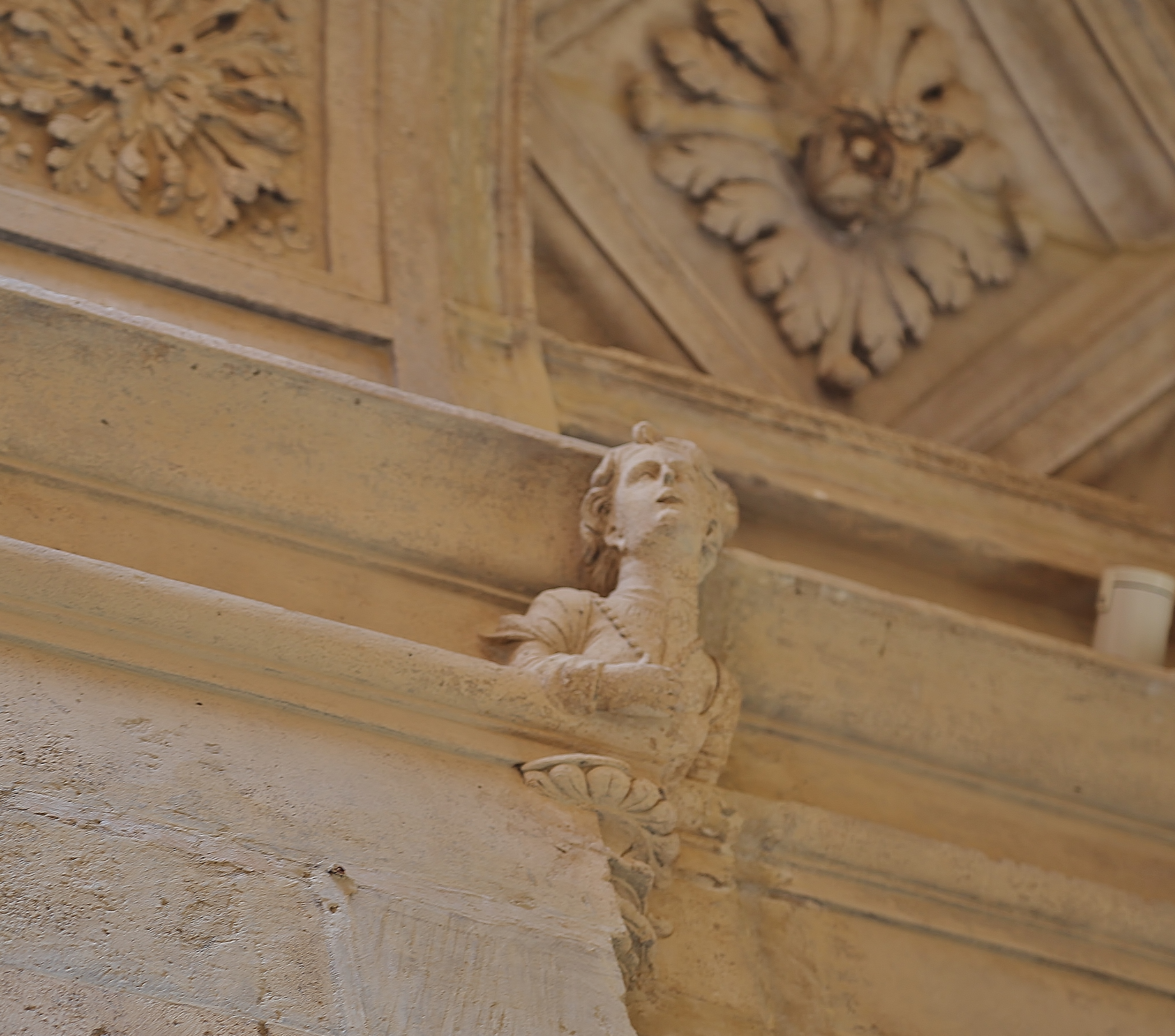
A detail

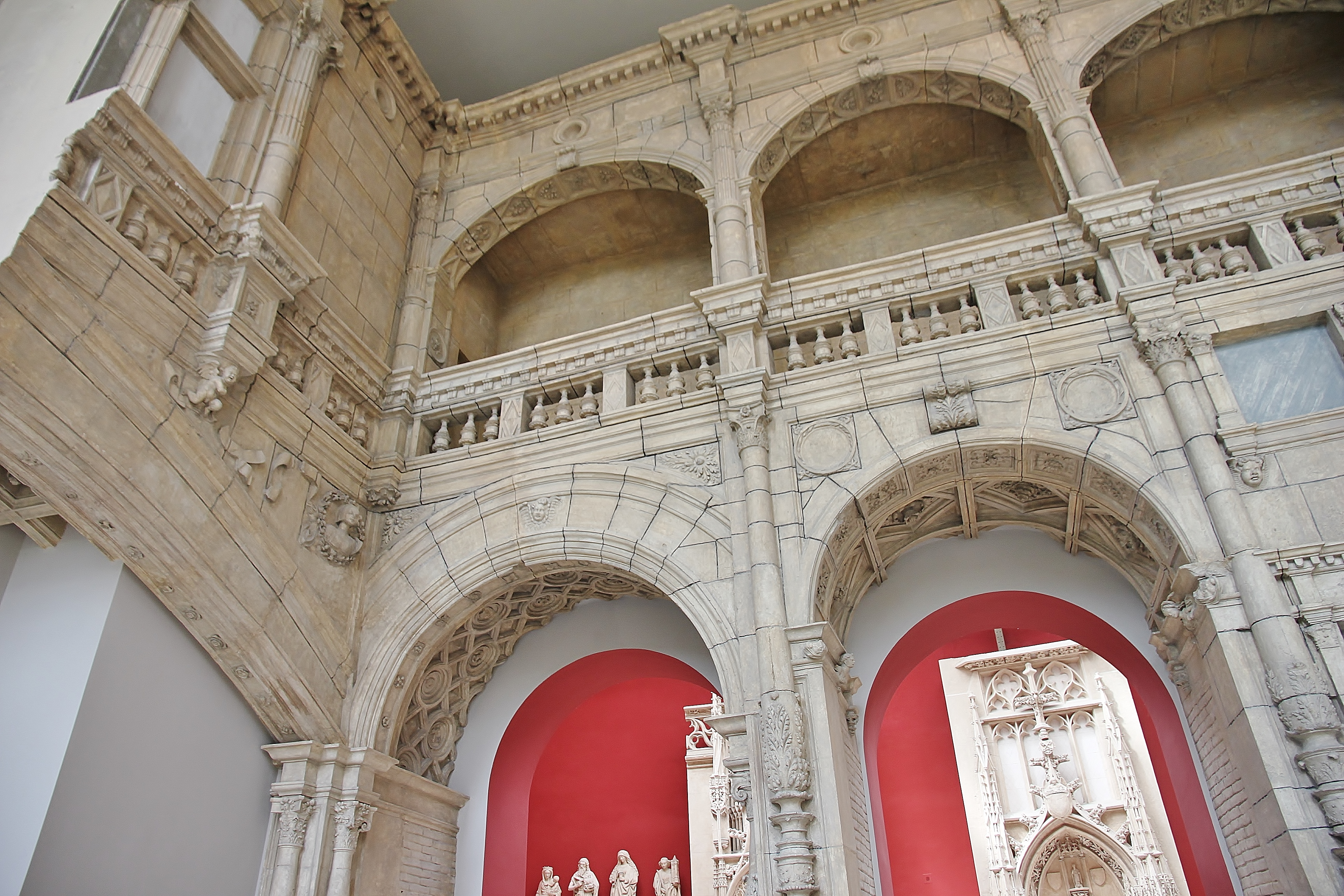
Molding of the courtyard at the Cité de l'Architecture et du Patrimoine in Paris

== See also ==
- Renaissance architecture of Toulouse

== Bibliography ==
- Guy Ahlsell de Toulza, Louis Peyrusse, Bruno Tollon, Hôtels et Demeures de Toulouse et du Midi Toulousain, Daniel Briand éditeur, Drémil Lafage, 1997
