= Hôtel Thomas de Montval =

Hôtel particulier in Toulouse, France

Coordinates: 43.5998°N 1.4478°E

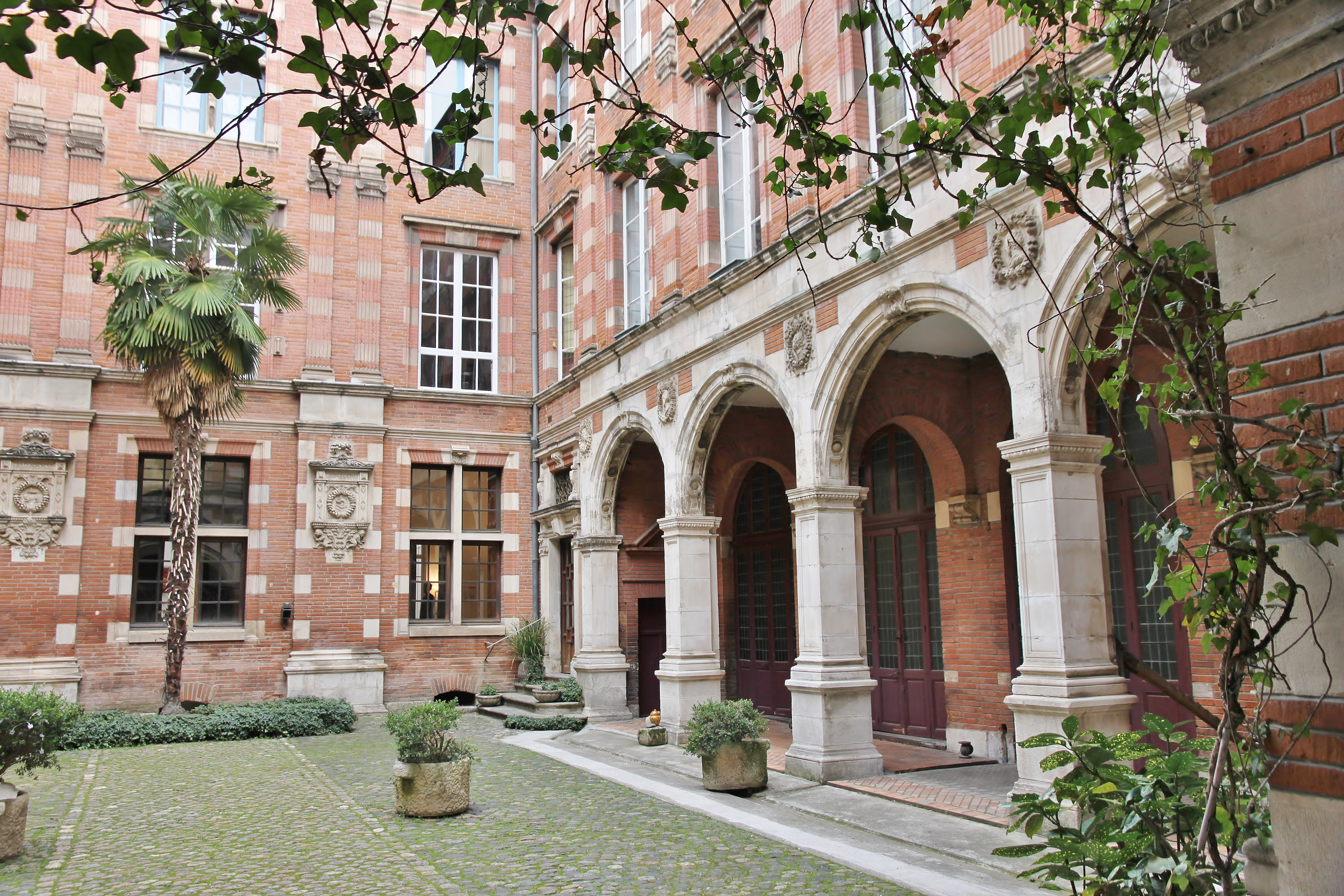
The courtyard of the Hôtel Thomas de Montval

The Hôtel Thomas de Montval in Toulouse, France, is a 20th-century hôtel particulier (palace) built with Renaissance elements of the 16th century. The central porch gives access to the inner courtyard through a covered passage. The façades are built on two floors and are decorated with fluted pilasters in alternating brick and stone.

== History ==
Built between 1901 and 1904 by the architect Jules Calbairac, Hôtel Thomas de Montval on rue Croix-Baragnon also recycled some of the remains of the beautiful Hôtel Jean de Pins (built in the sixteenth century and demolished at the start of the twentieth century). In total, eight arcades from the Renaissance townhouse were used for the left wing of the courtyard. They were also the inspiration for the architecture and the ornamentation of the right wing.

These Renaissance arcades featuring portrait medallions were commissioned by the merchant Jean de Nolet in 1542 and executed by the sculptor Nicolas Bachelier. Their framework, featuring a floral wreath (referred to as a 'triumphal garland' in the surviving documents), draws on Roman triumphs (laurel), as well as the arms of the sixteenth-century merchant: "On azure two palms or in saltire, surmounted by a wreath of roses proper on a fesse, ribboned argent and between three stars same, two borne in chief and one in point".

== Ornamentation ==
The portrait medallions in the courtyard are typical of the Renaissance, they celebrate the human figure. This iconography draws its inspiration from the coins minted under various Roman emperors, gravestones and the decorative elements of classical shields. This theme enjoyed great success in the first half of the sixteenth century, permeating all the arts. The six original profiles still extant on Hôtel Thomas de Montval depict the faces of a Moor, a king, a wreathed emperor, a man in sixteenth century fashion and two characters in Roman garb. Nicolas Bachelier's style is noticeable for the prominent arches of the eyebrows and the often very thick lips of his figures.

In the early twentieth century Paul-Marius Thomas had six other medallions sculpted to give symmetry to the ornamentationof courtyard arcades. They bear the portraits of family members in a Neo-Renaissance style.

== Pictures ==
Hôtel Thomas de Montval

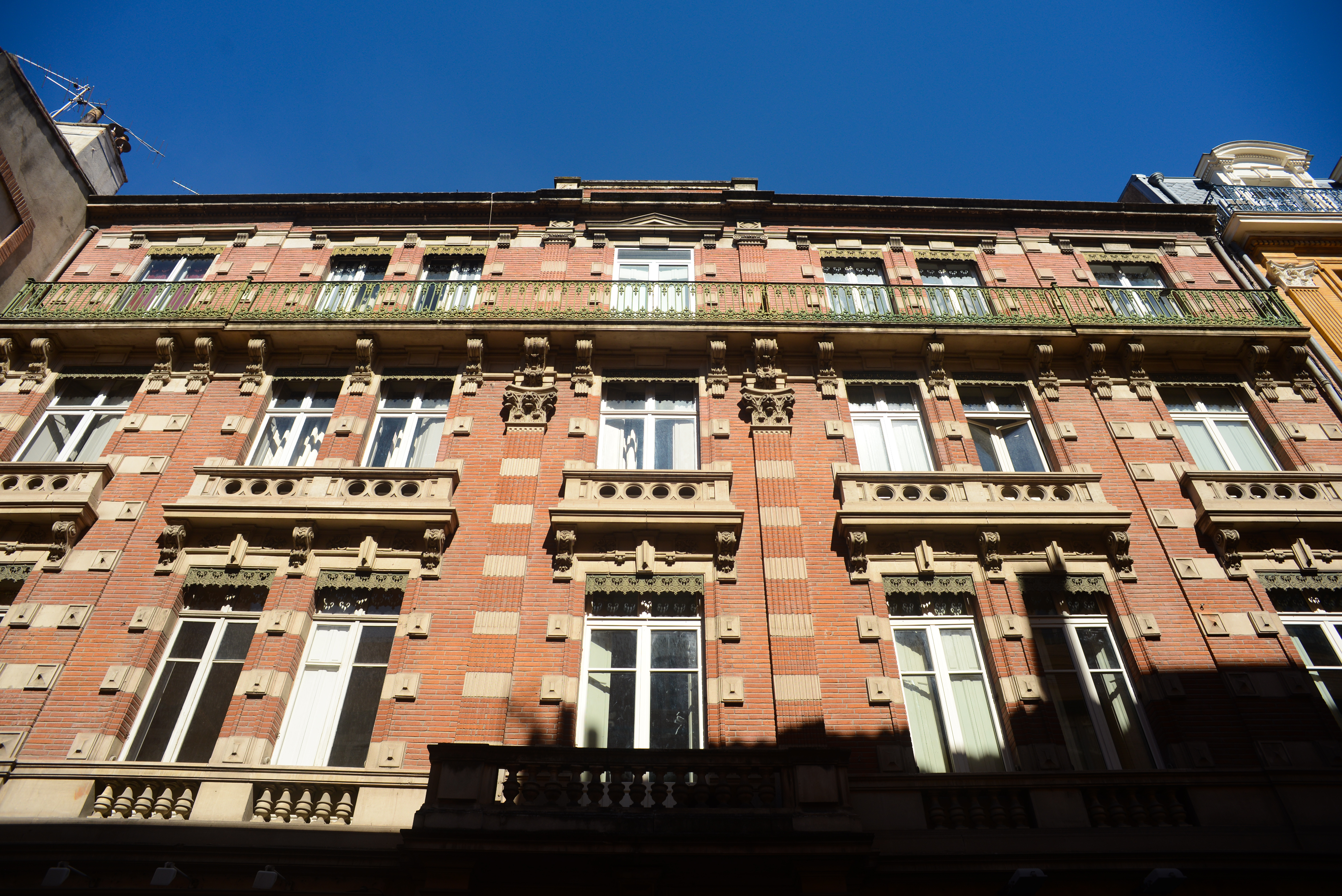

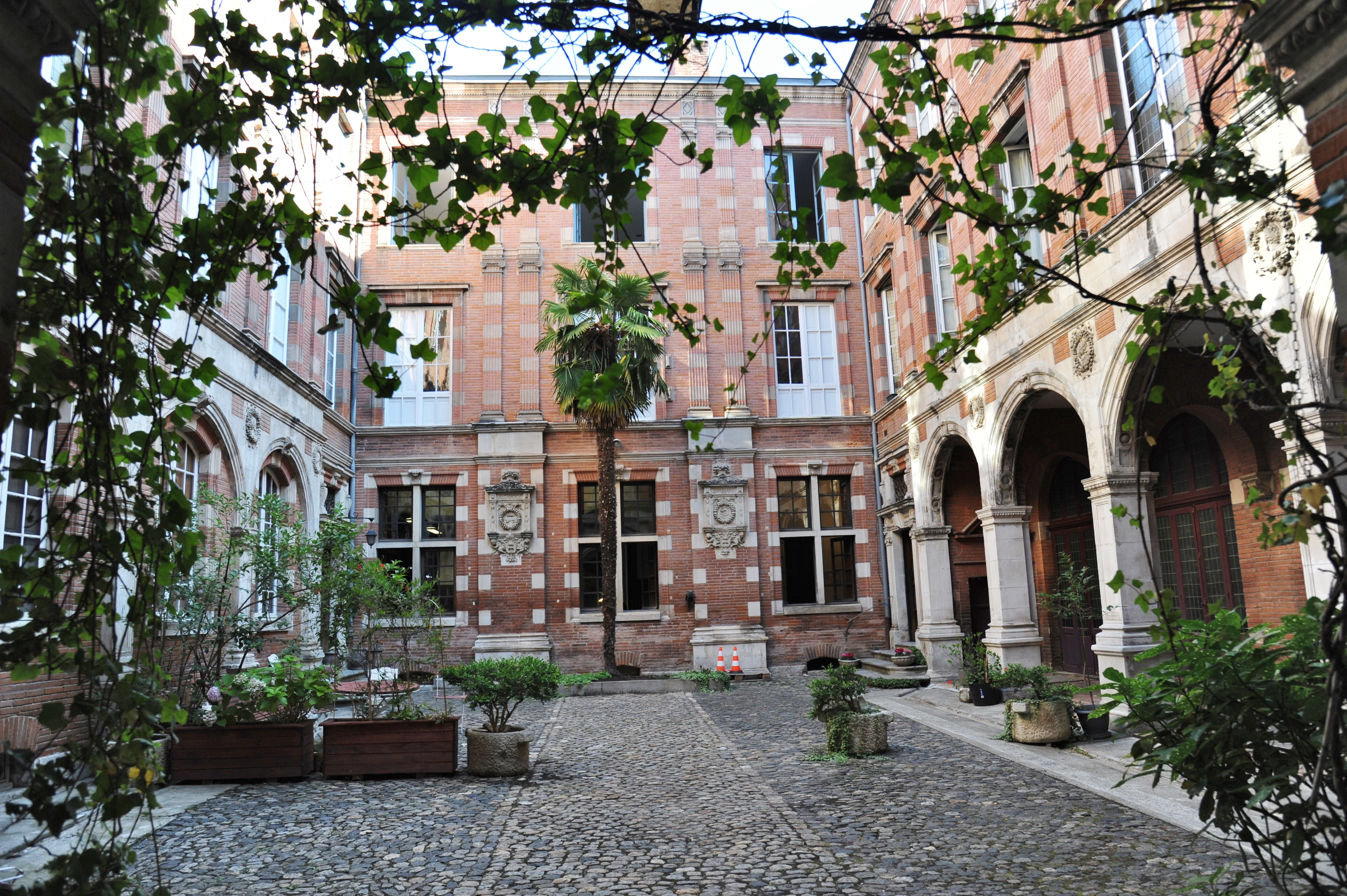

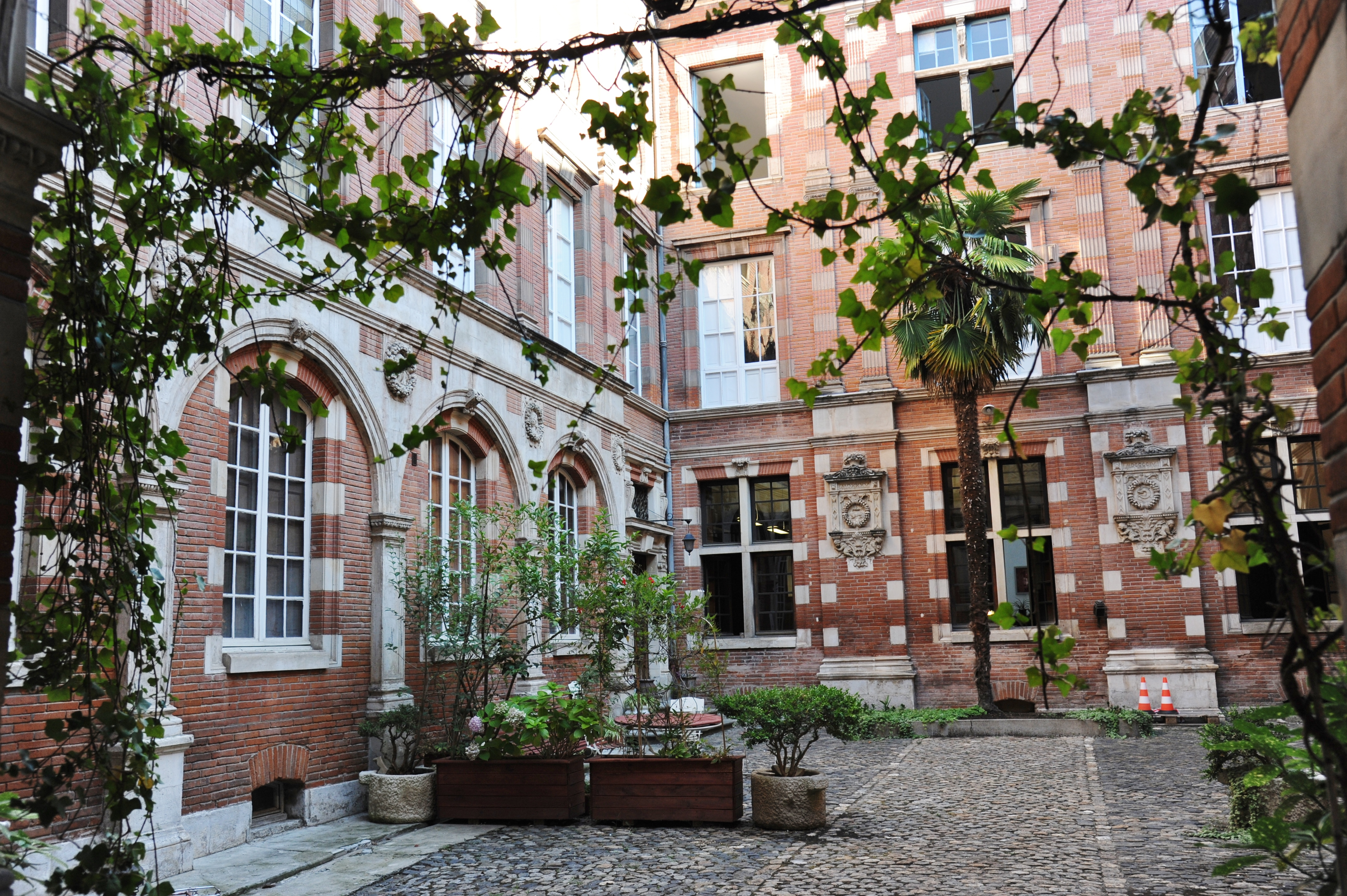

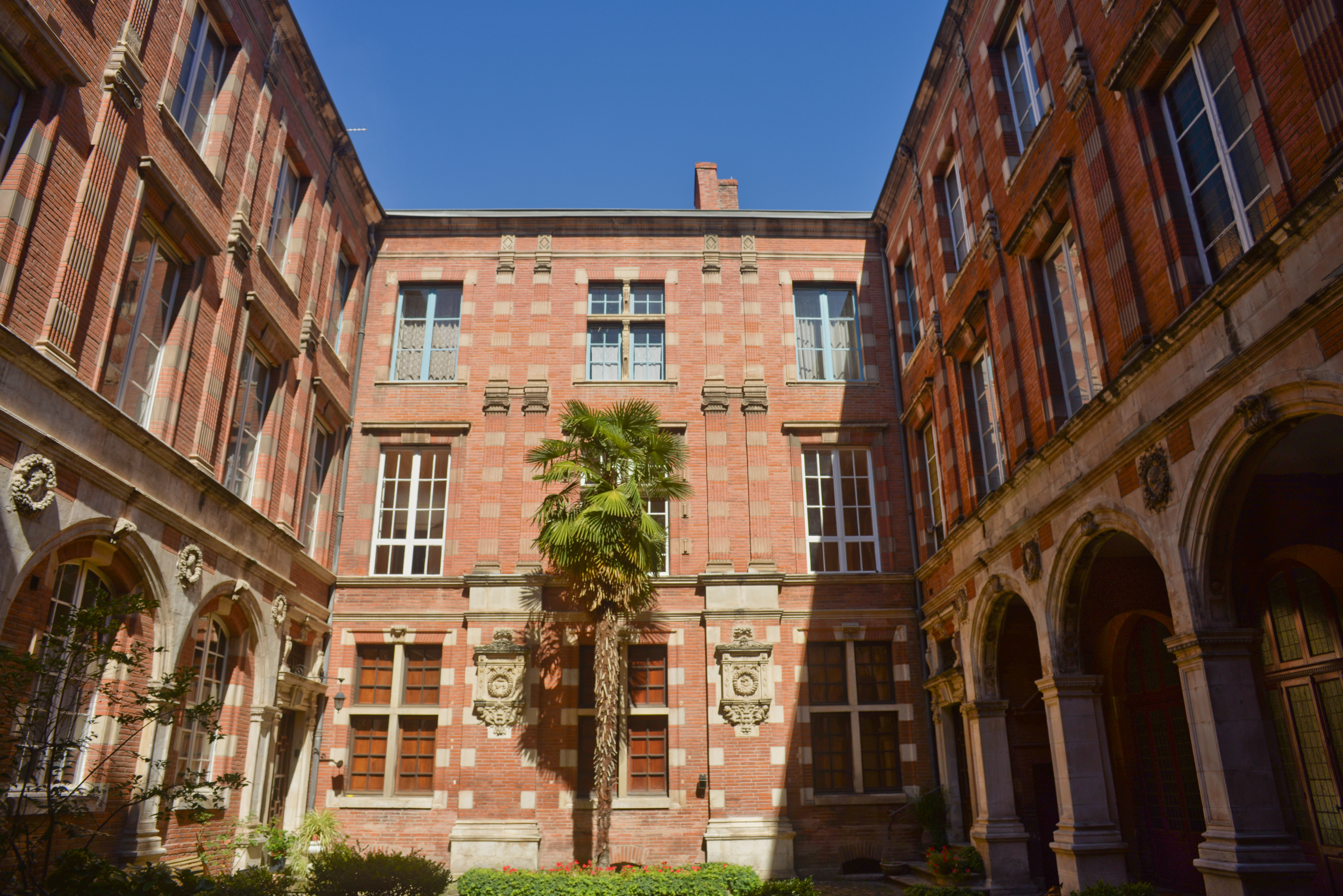

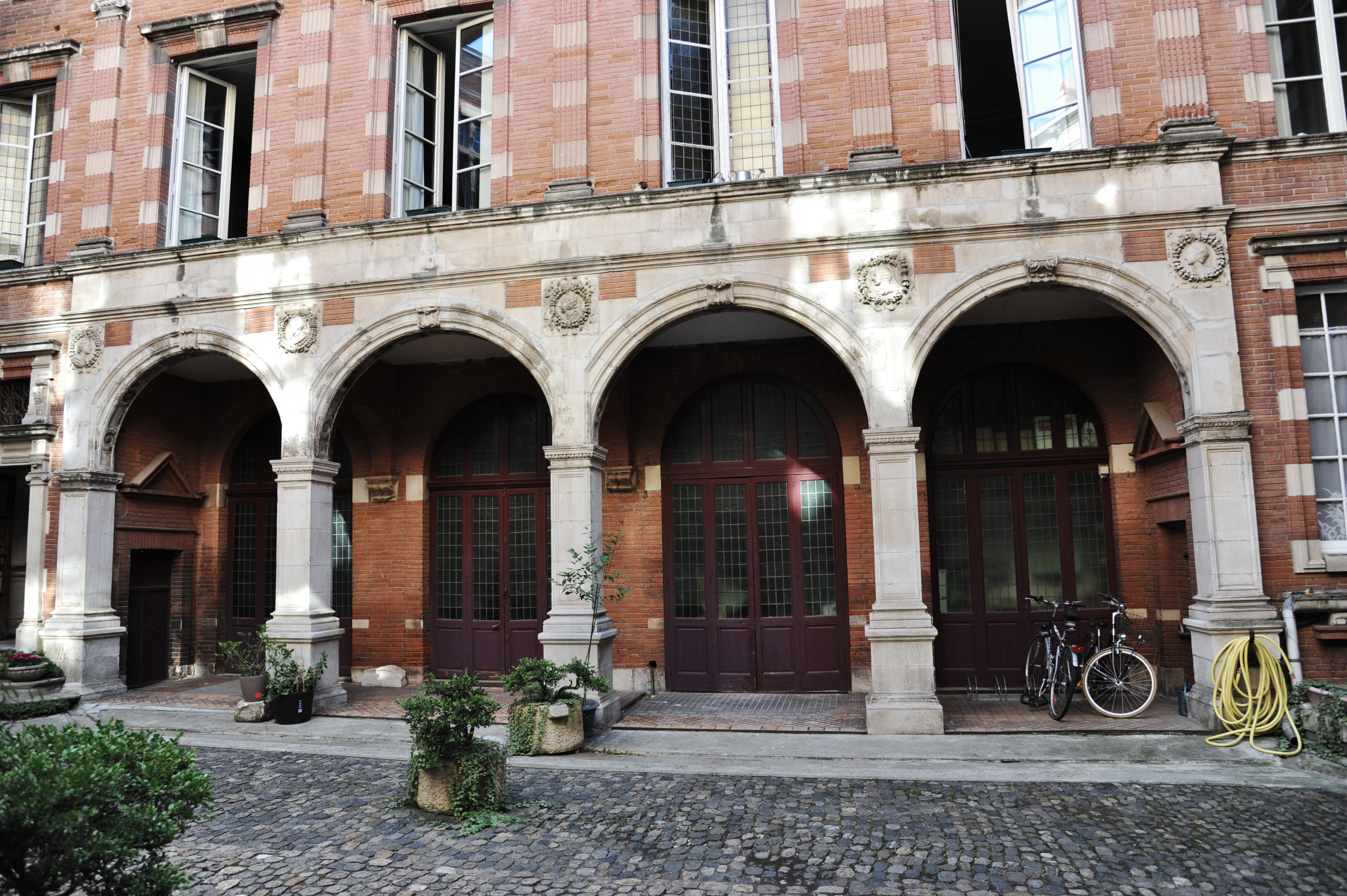

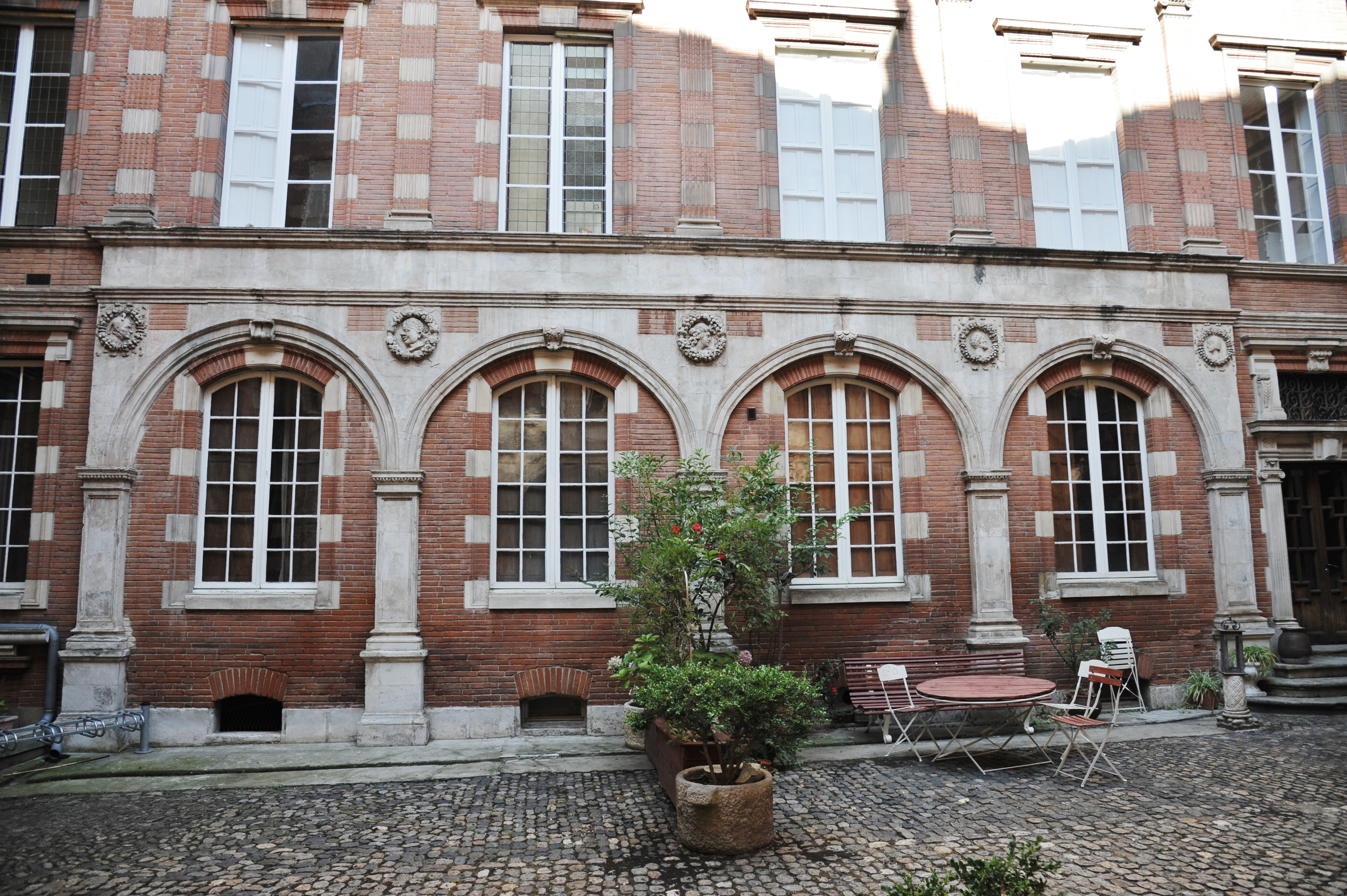

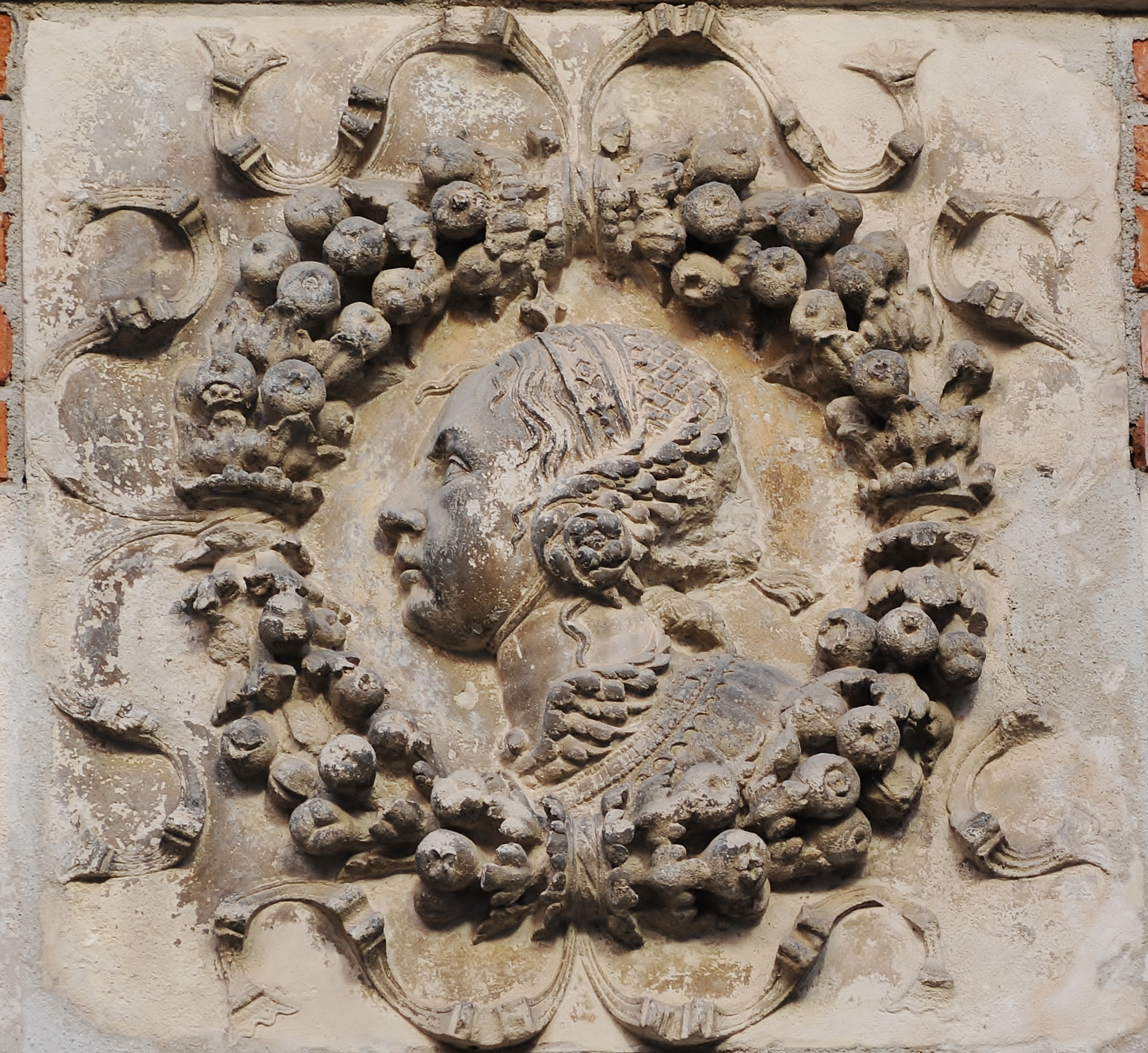

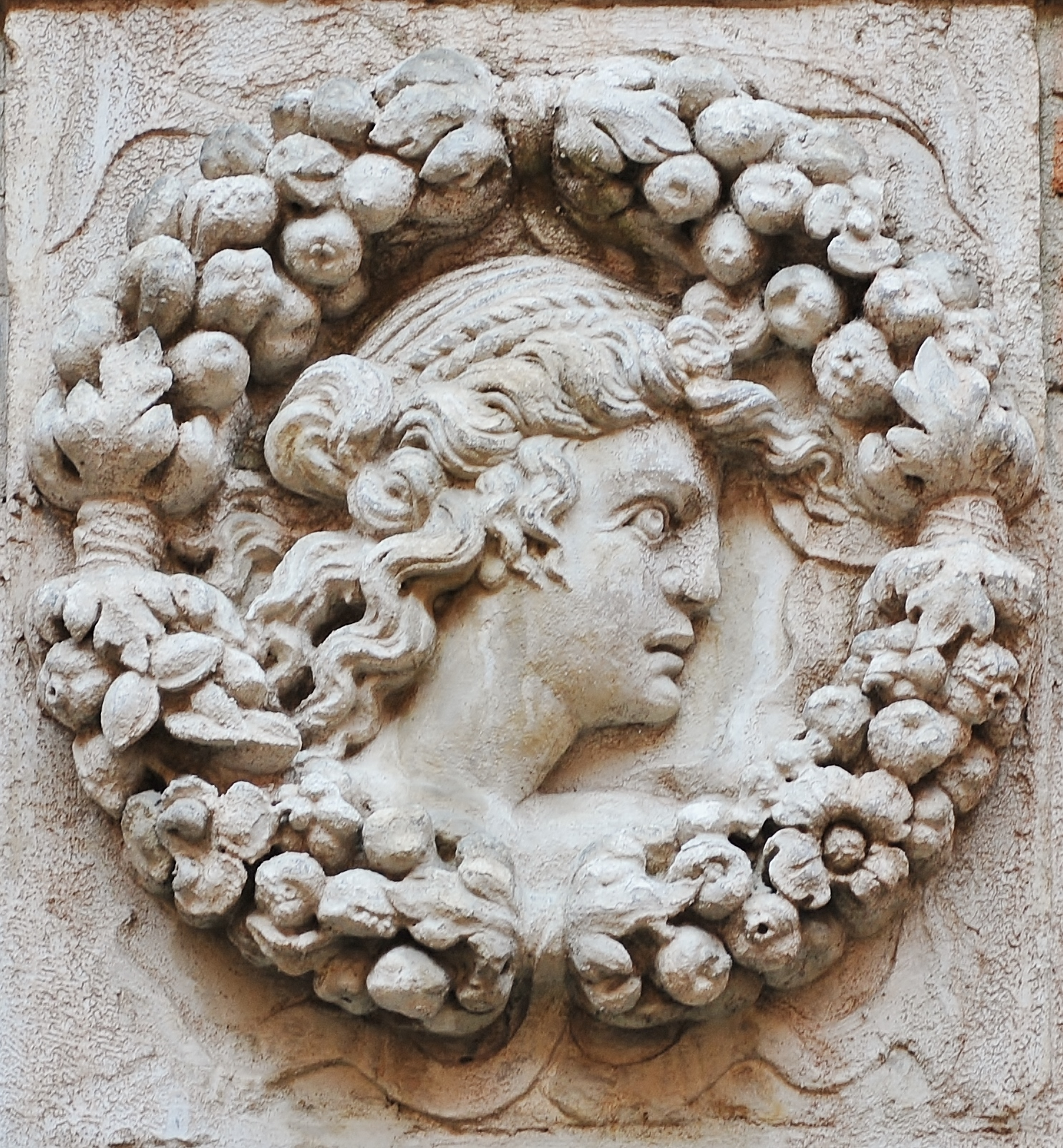

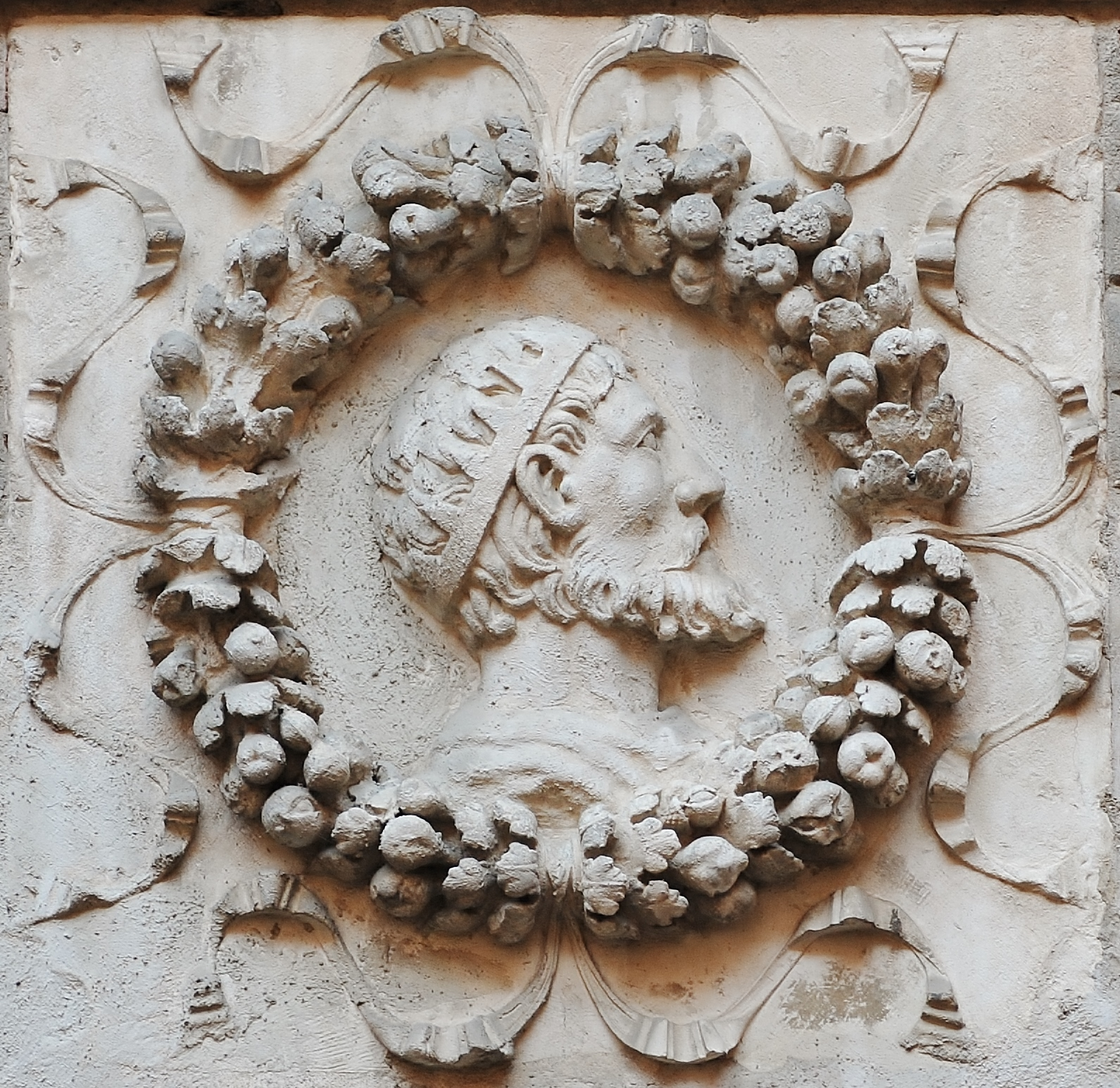

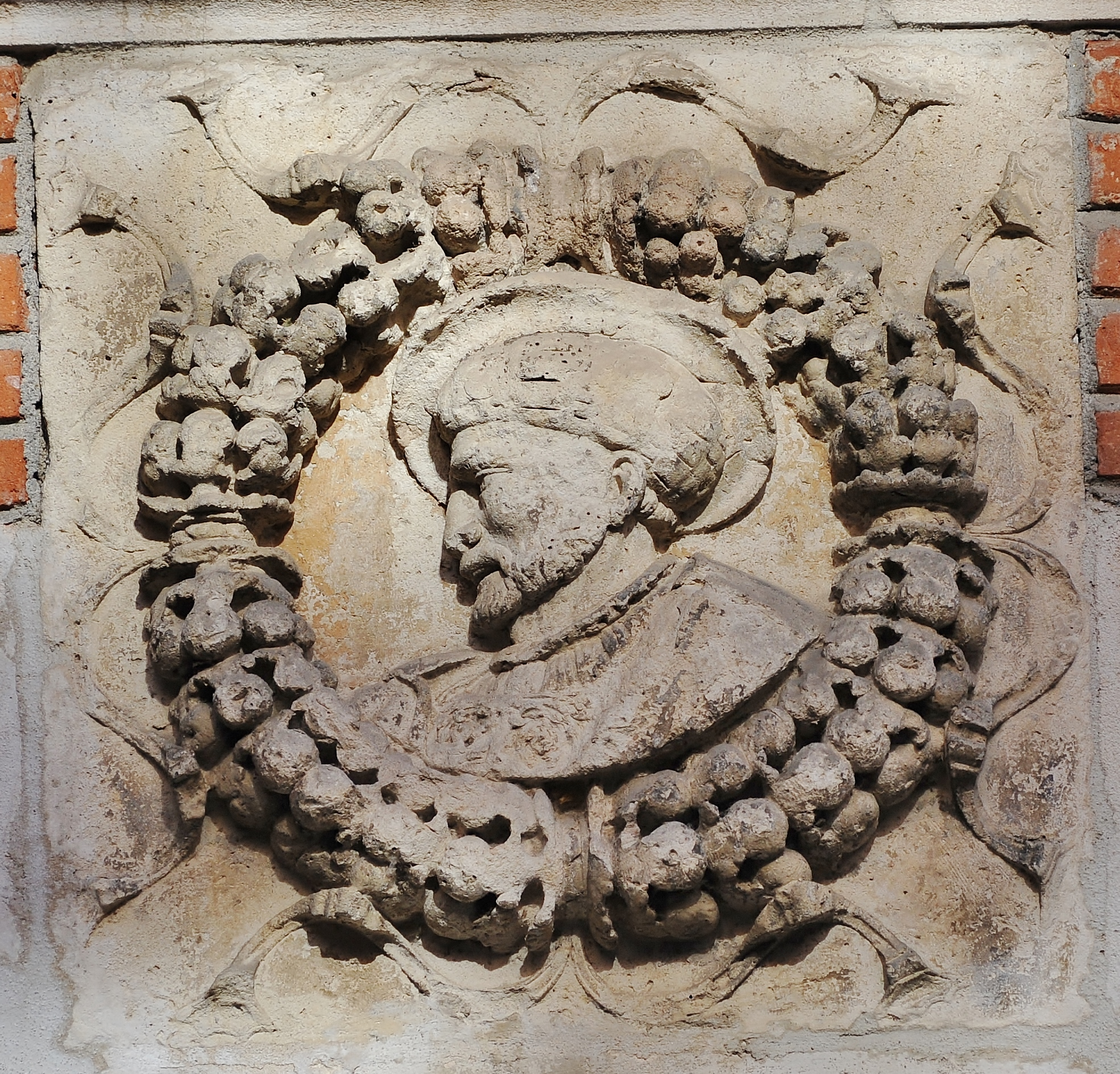

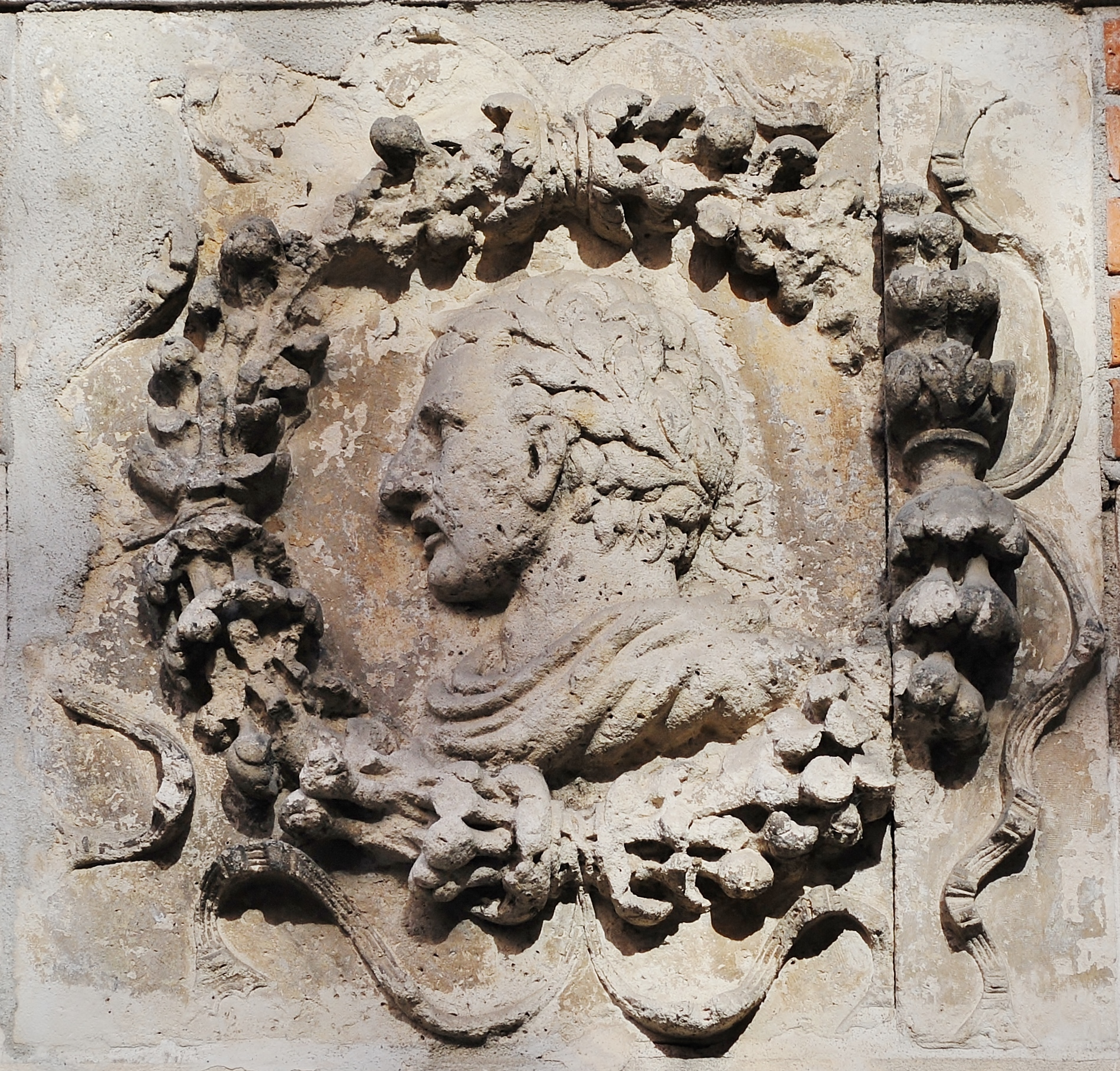

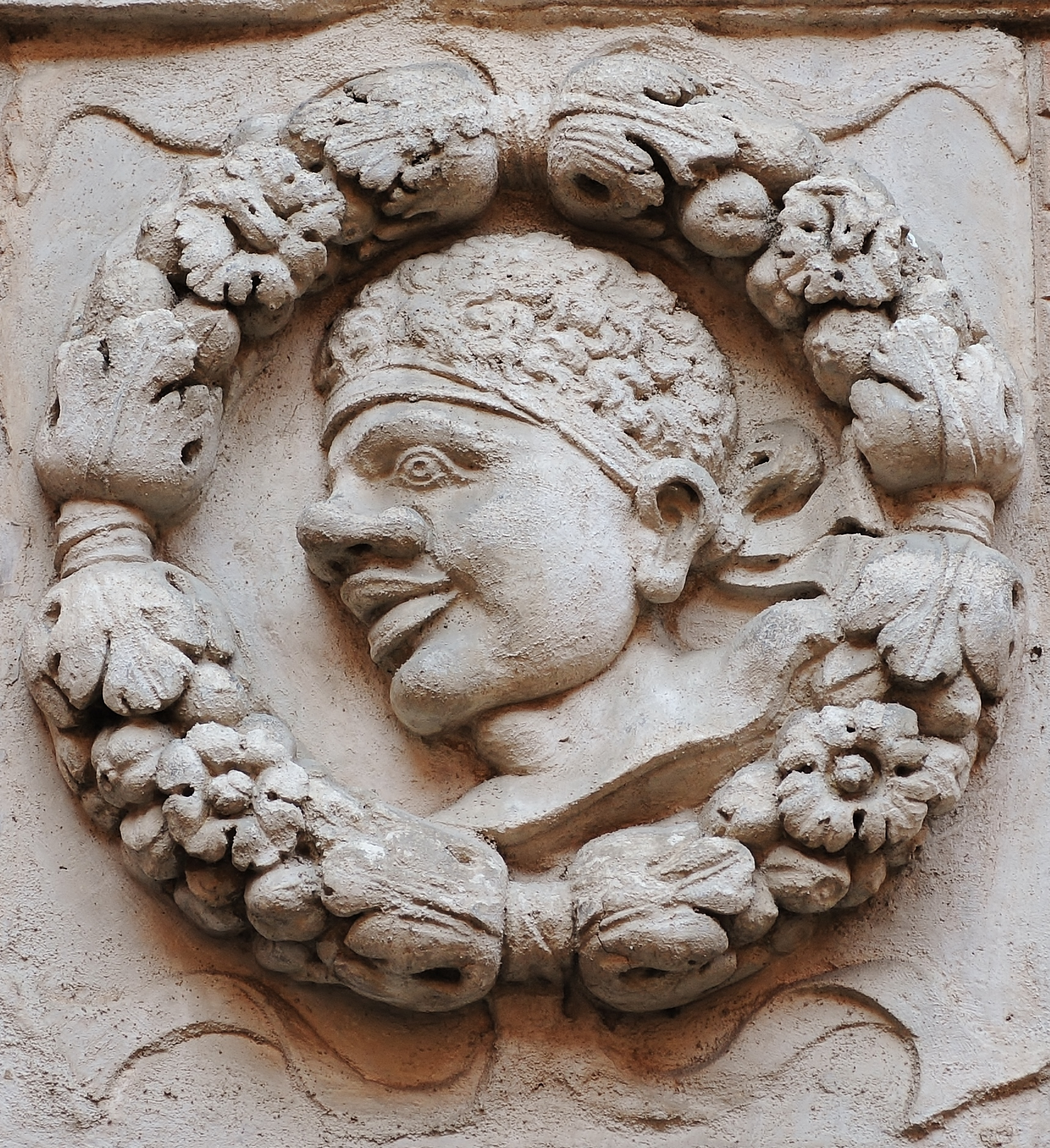

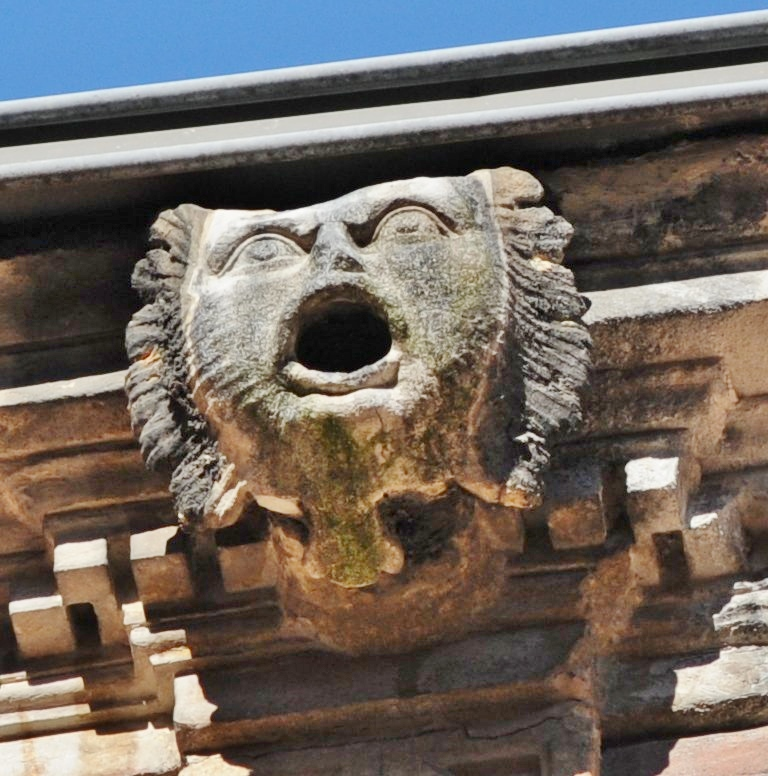

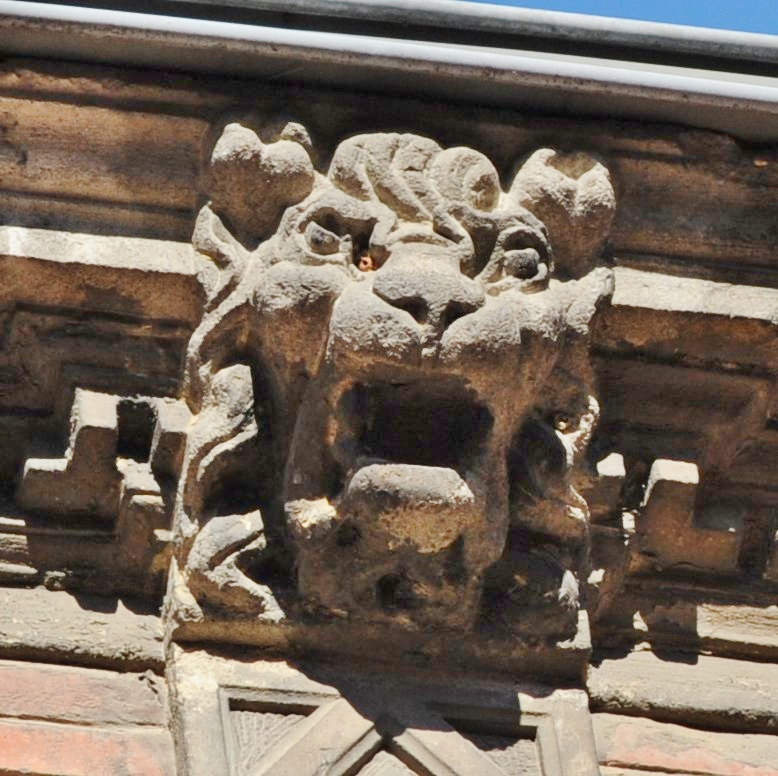

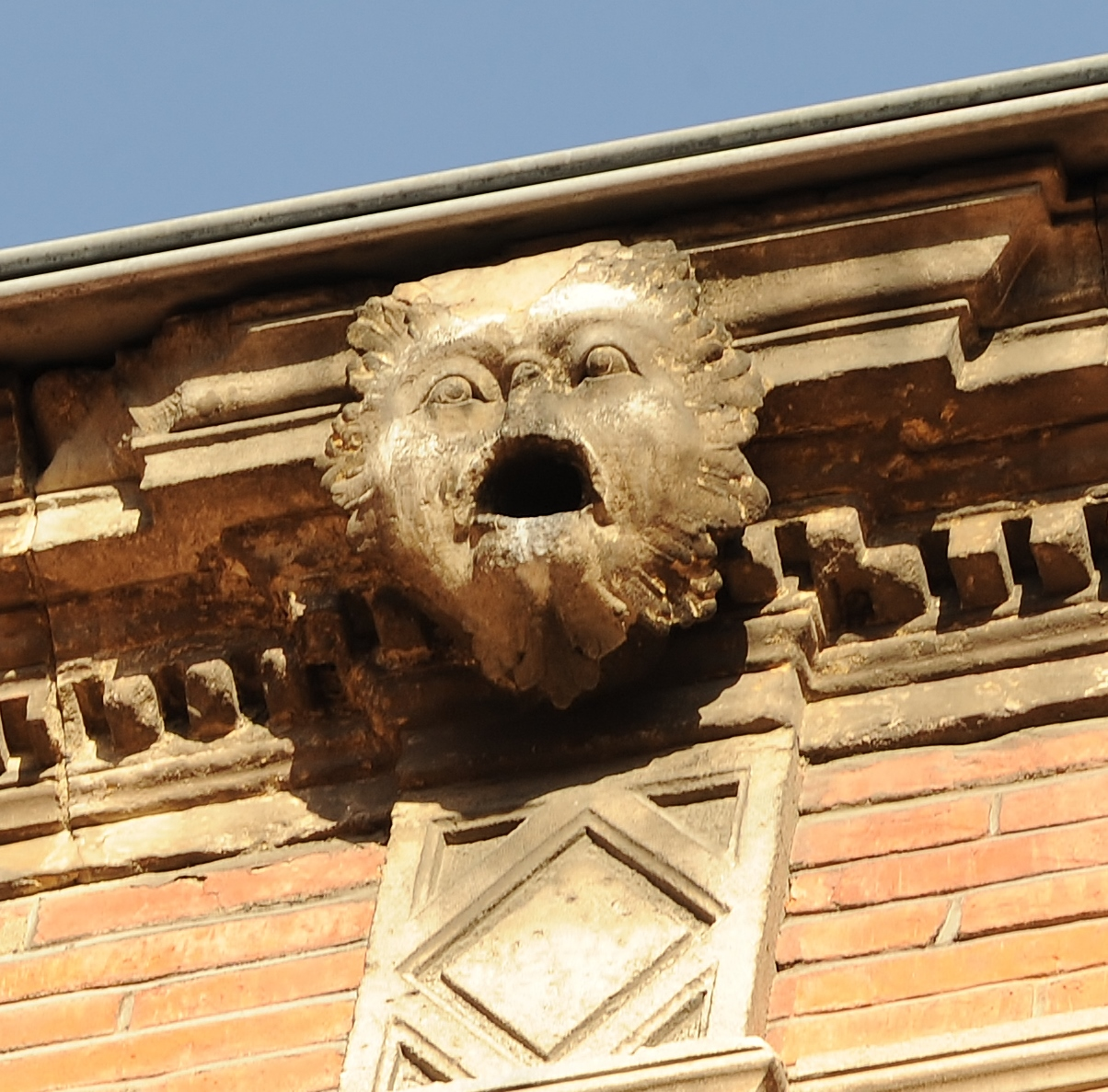

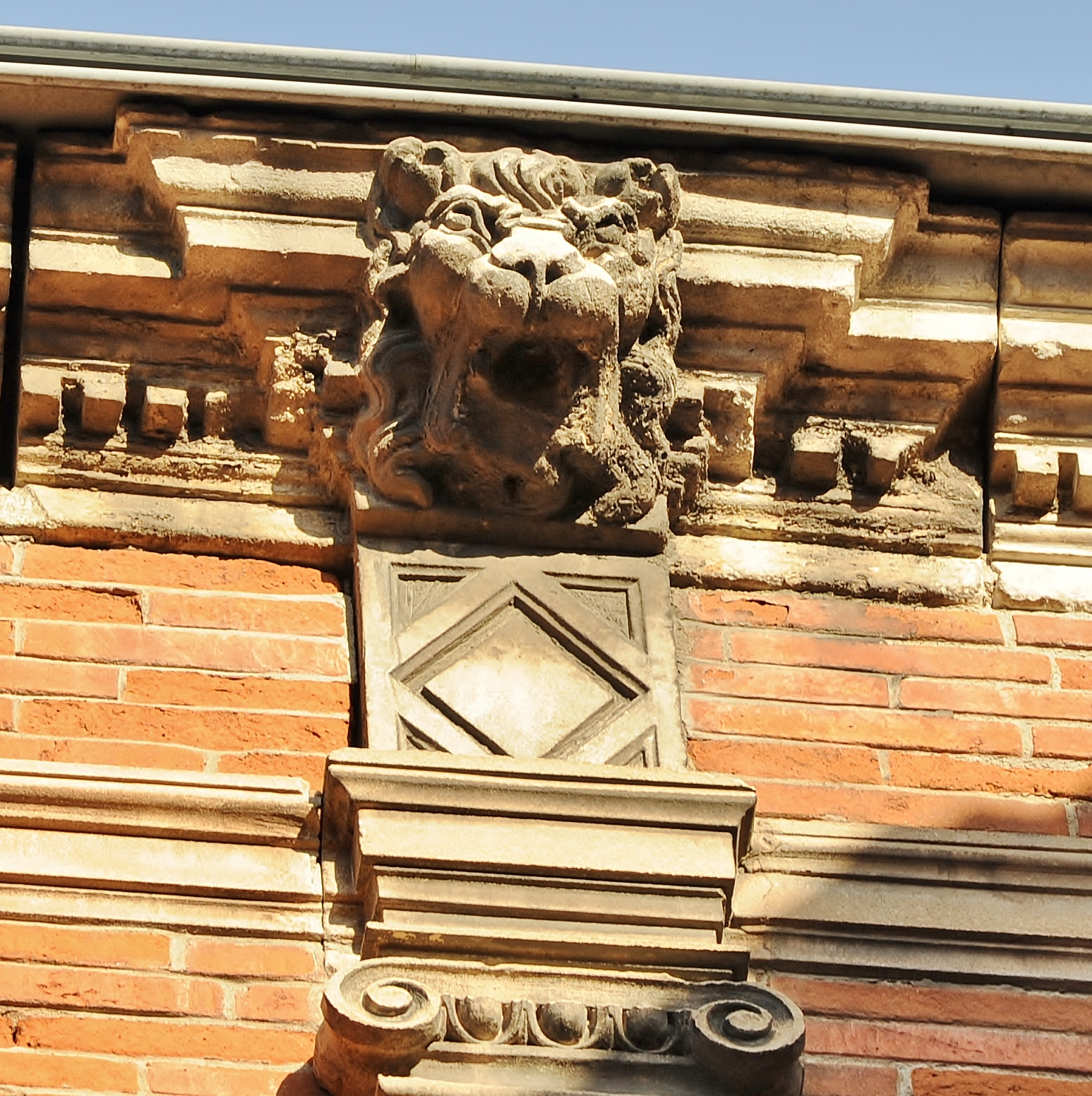

== See also ==
- Hôtel Jean de Pins
- Renaissance architecture of Toulouse

== Bibliography ==
- Guy Ahlsell de Toulza, Louis Peyrusse, Bruno Tollon, Hôtels et Demeures de Toulouse et du Midi Toulousain, Daniel Briand éditeur, Drémil Lafage, 1997
