= Hôtel Jean de Pins =

Hôtel particulier in Toulouse, France

Coordinates: 43.5988°N 1.4460°E

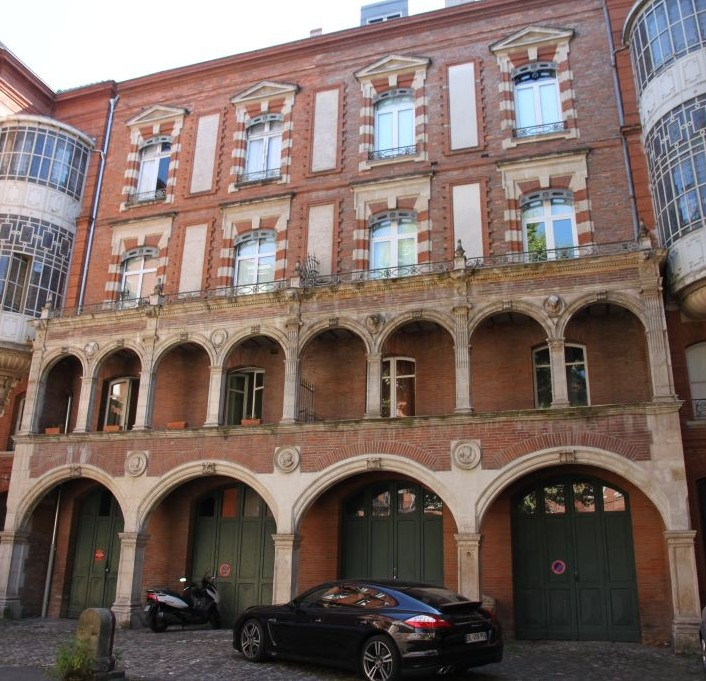
The Hôtel Jean de Pins.

The Hôtel Jean de Pins in Toulouse, France, is a Renaissance hôtel particulier (palace) of the 16th century. Its double gallery on the courtyard is a listed historical monument since 1995.

== History ==
Hôtel de Pins, built by humanist Jean de Pins, was almost entirely demolished in the early twentieth century to make way for a new street known as rue de Languedoc. Some remains of the building, considered in the sixteenth century as a 'magnificent palace', did in fact survive and were incorporated into Hôtel Antonin, built on same site in 1903, and Hôtel Thomas de Montval on rue Croix-Baragnon.

Jean de Pins, senator to Milan (1515), French ambassador to Venice (1516-1520) and later Rome (1520-1522), returned to Toulouse to devote himself to the humanities and start the construction of his townhouse around 1530. Located close to the parliament on a plot measuring more than 3,000 square metres, the hôtel comprised two houses placed at right angles. One was situated between the street and the courtyard, while the other, larger one stood between the courtyard and the garden. They were connected by a system of superimposed galleries.

== Architecture ==
Jean de Pins returned from Italy with a taste for architectural regularity and repetition (arcades) and an attraction for outdoor pleasures (galleries, garden). He also broke with the Toulousain tradition of the great staircase tower.

In 1542 the next owner, the merchant Jean de Nolet, started adapting it to his needs by building a shop with arcades opening on to the street and a side entrance to the courtyard.

In 1903 the architect Joseph Thillet cleverly assembled two galleries in the courtyard of Hôtel Antonin. The ground-floor gallery came from the section modified by Nolet in 1542, while the first floor came from the period of Jean de Pins.

== Ornamentation ==
The ornamentation in the courtyard is typical of the Renaissance. In addition to the human figure, which is celebrated in the portrait medallions, the attentive observer will notice very precise references to classical architecture.

Indeed, Jean de Pins instructed the mason working for him to sculpt the Ionic pilasters on the gallery according to the engraving of a treatise on classical architecture published in Italy in 1521, which he probably discovered during his travels.

In 1542, Jean de Nolet hired the famous sculptor and architect Nicolas Bachelier for the creation of medallions, the majority of which are currently at the Hôtel Thomas de Montval.

== Pictures ==
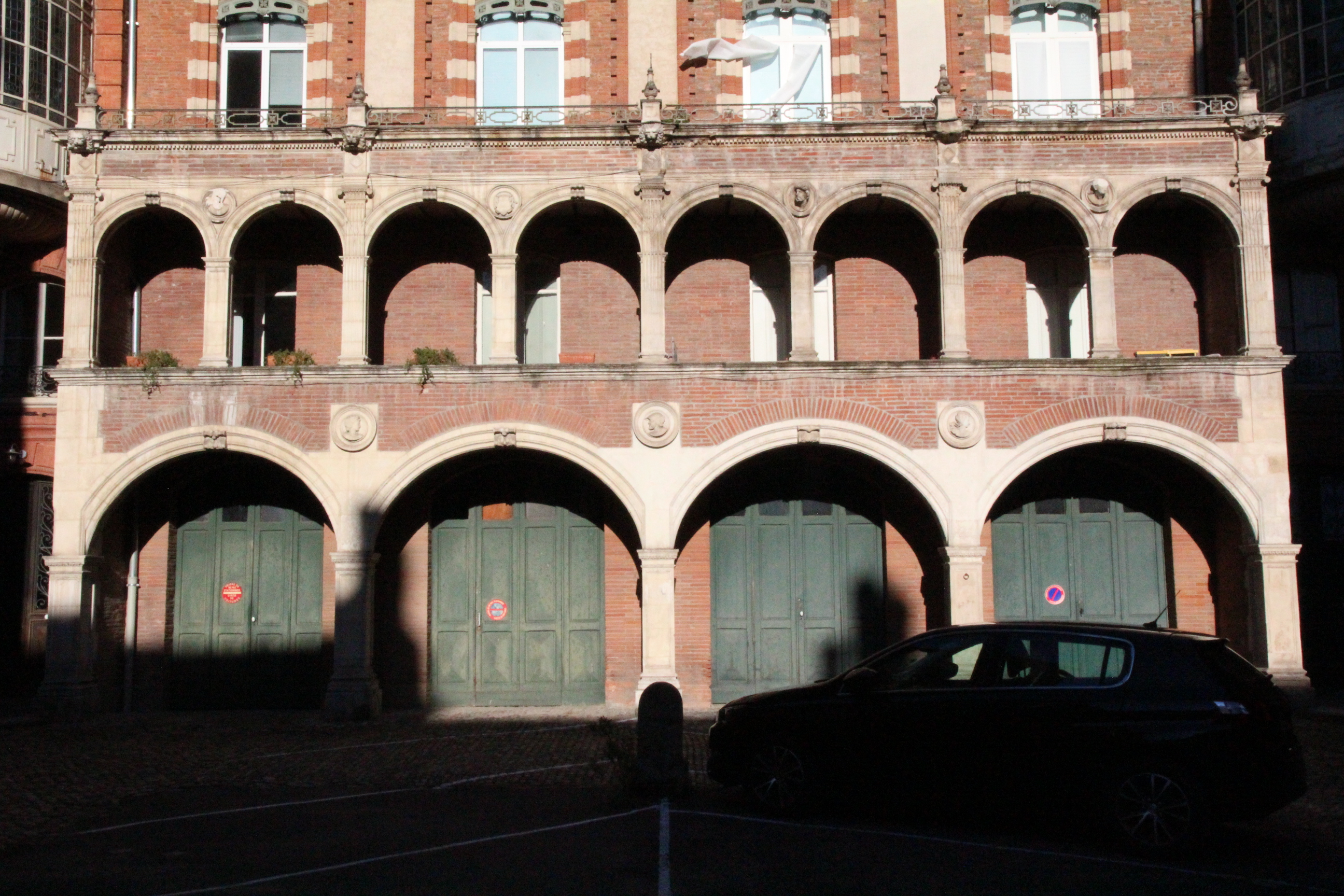

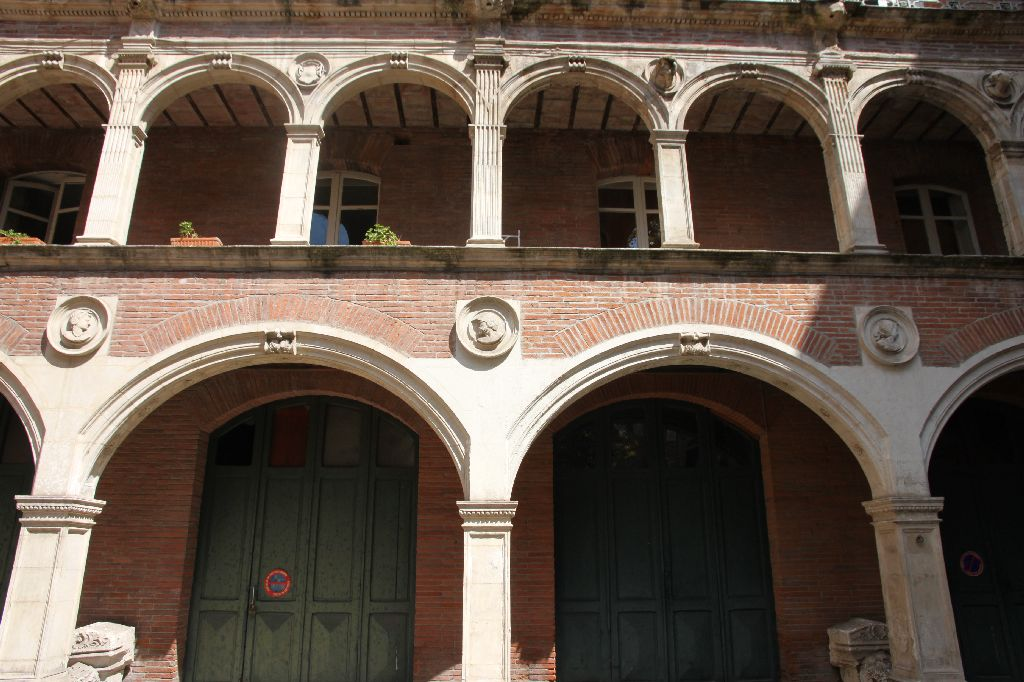

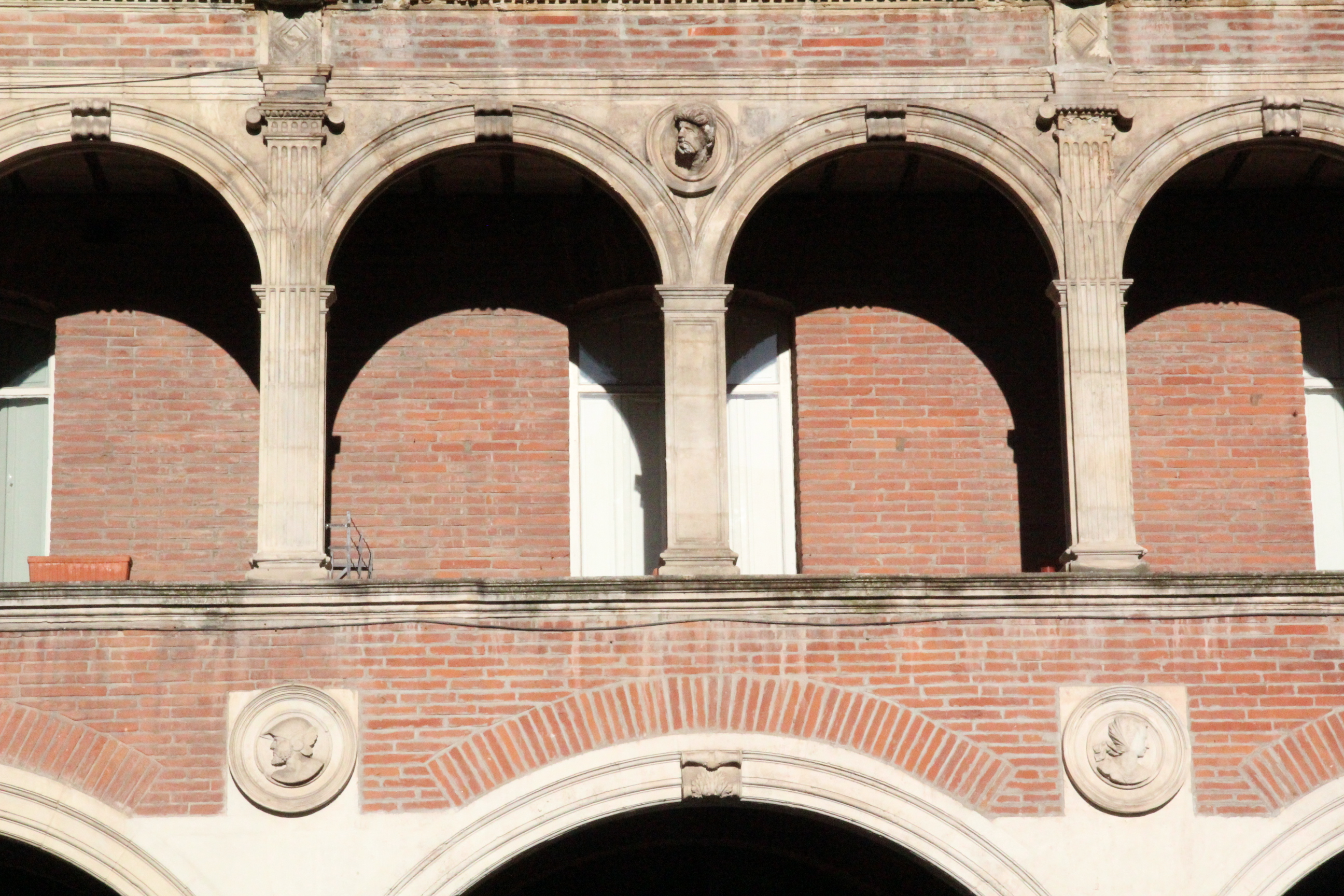

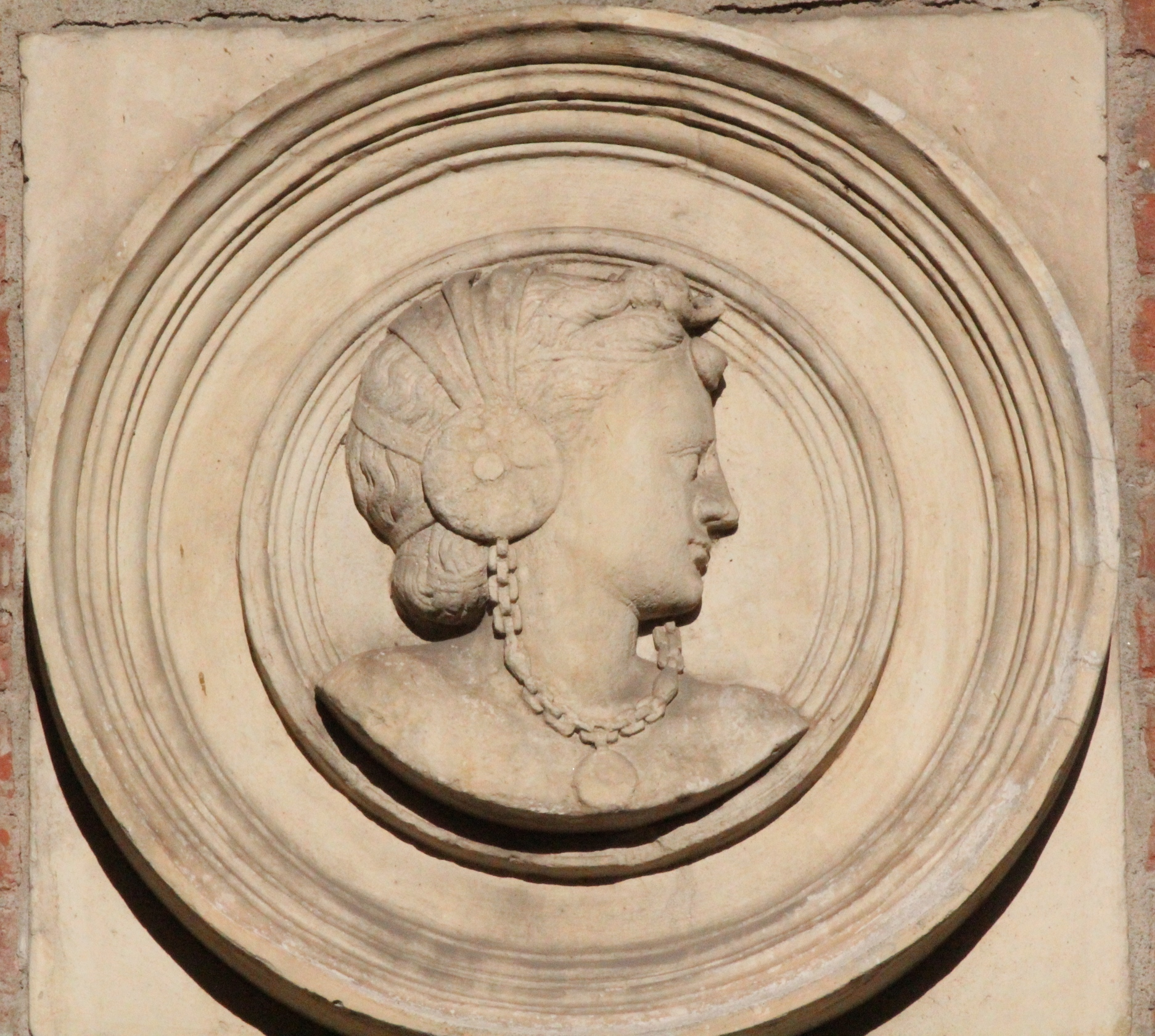

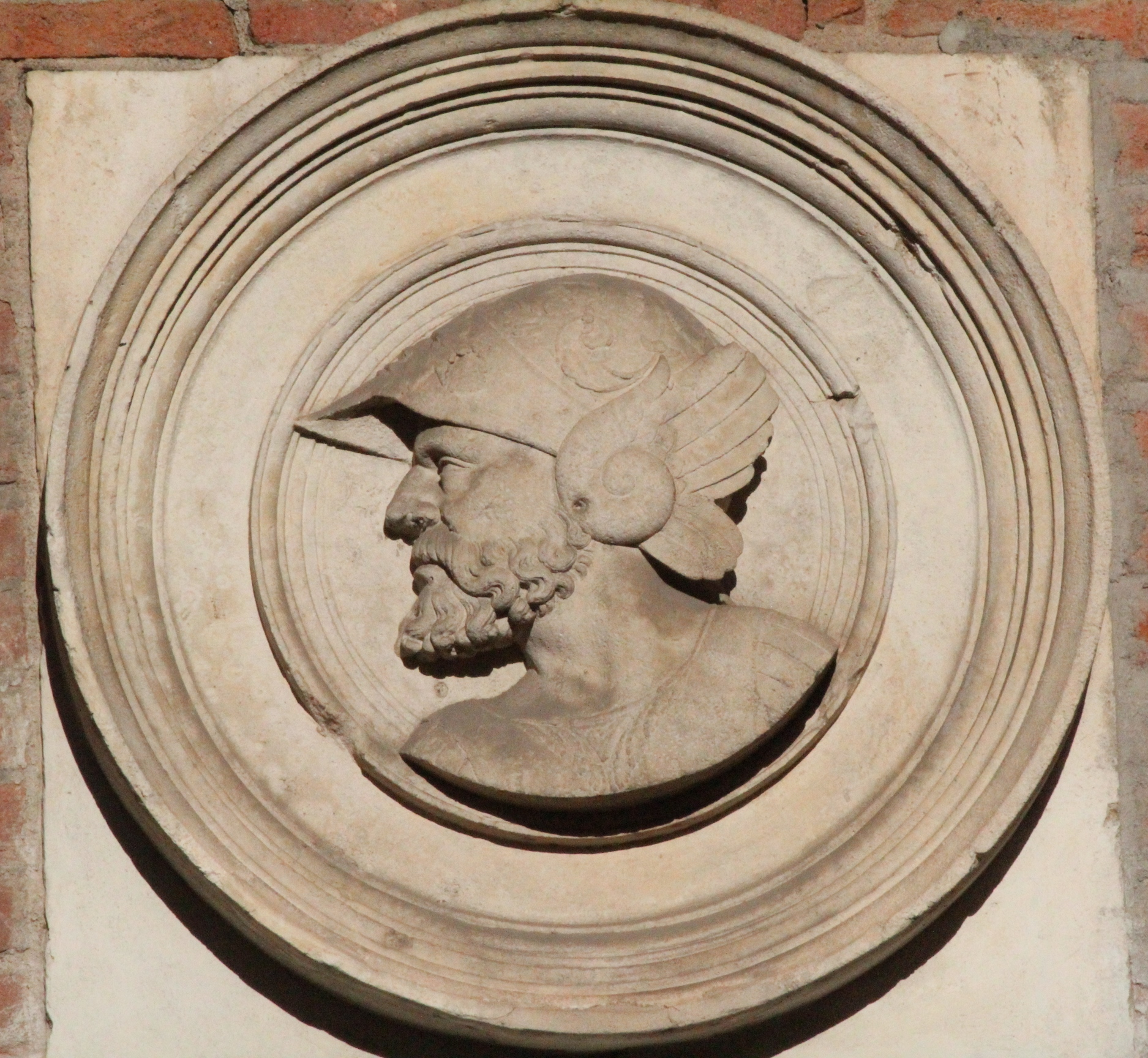

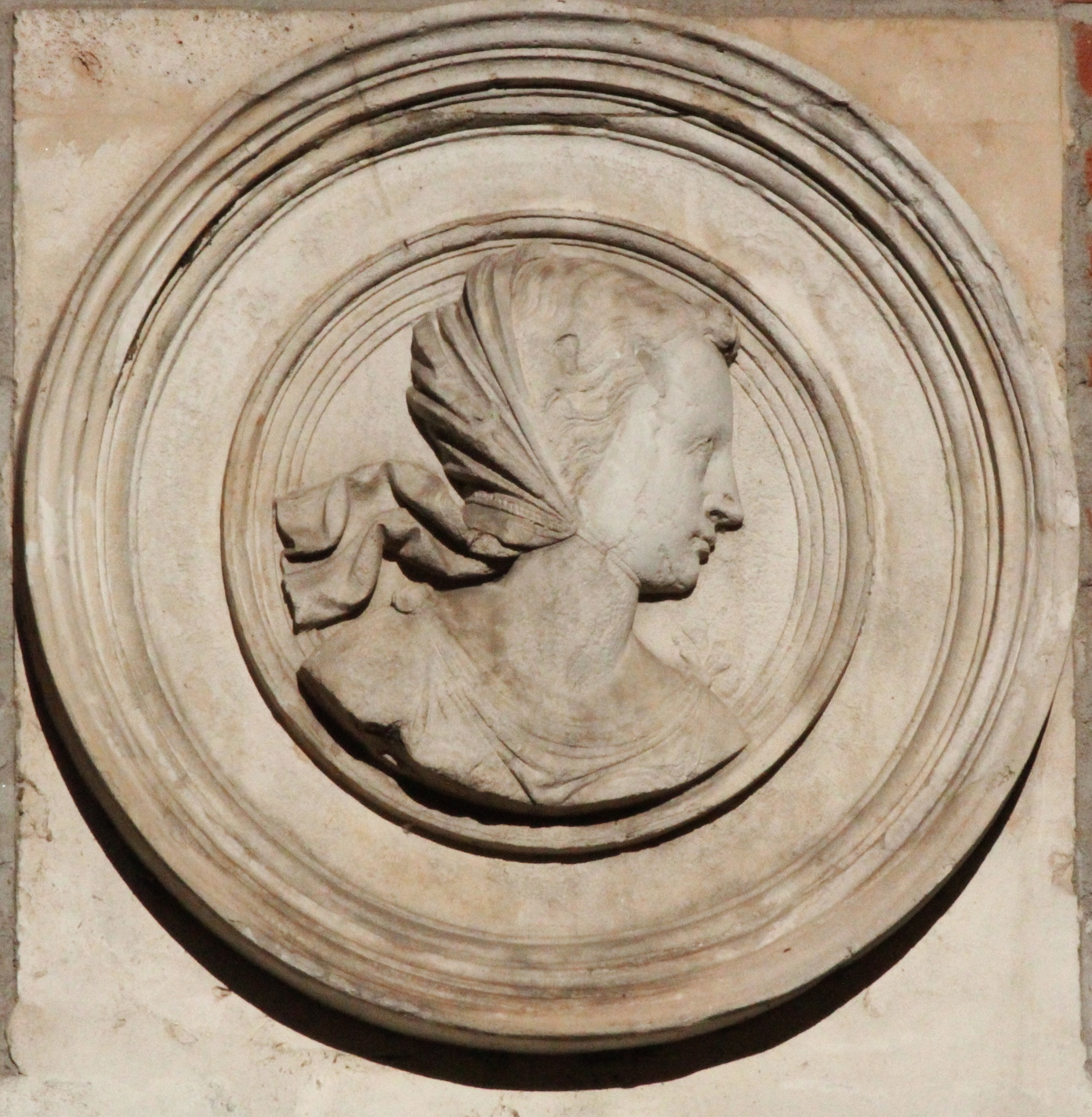

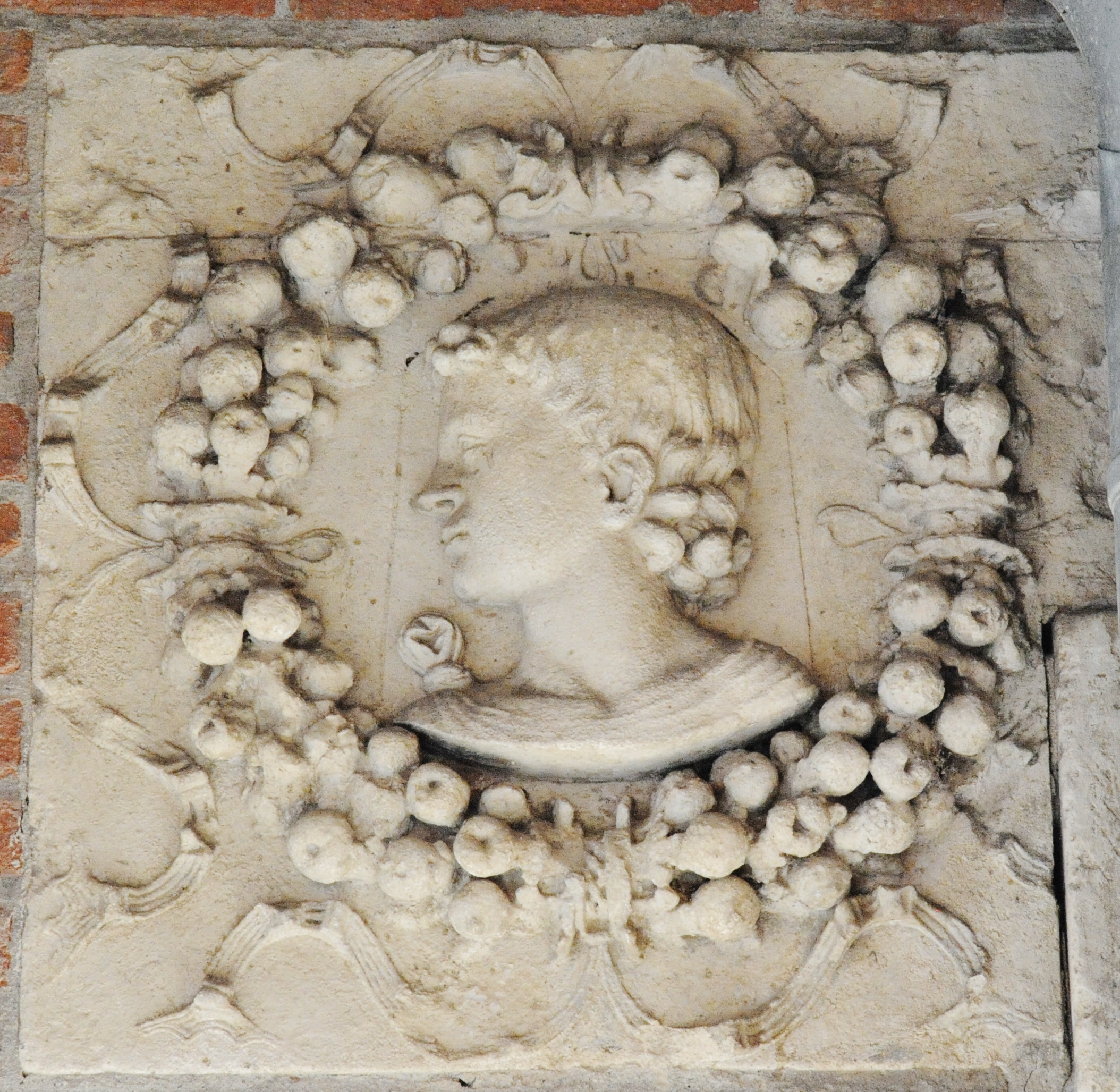

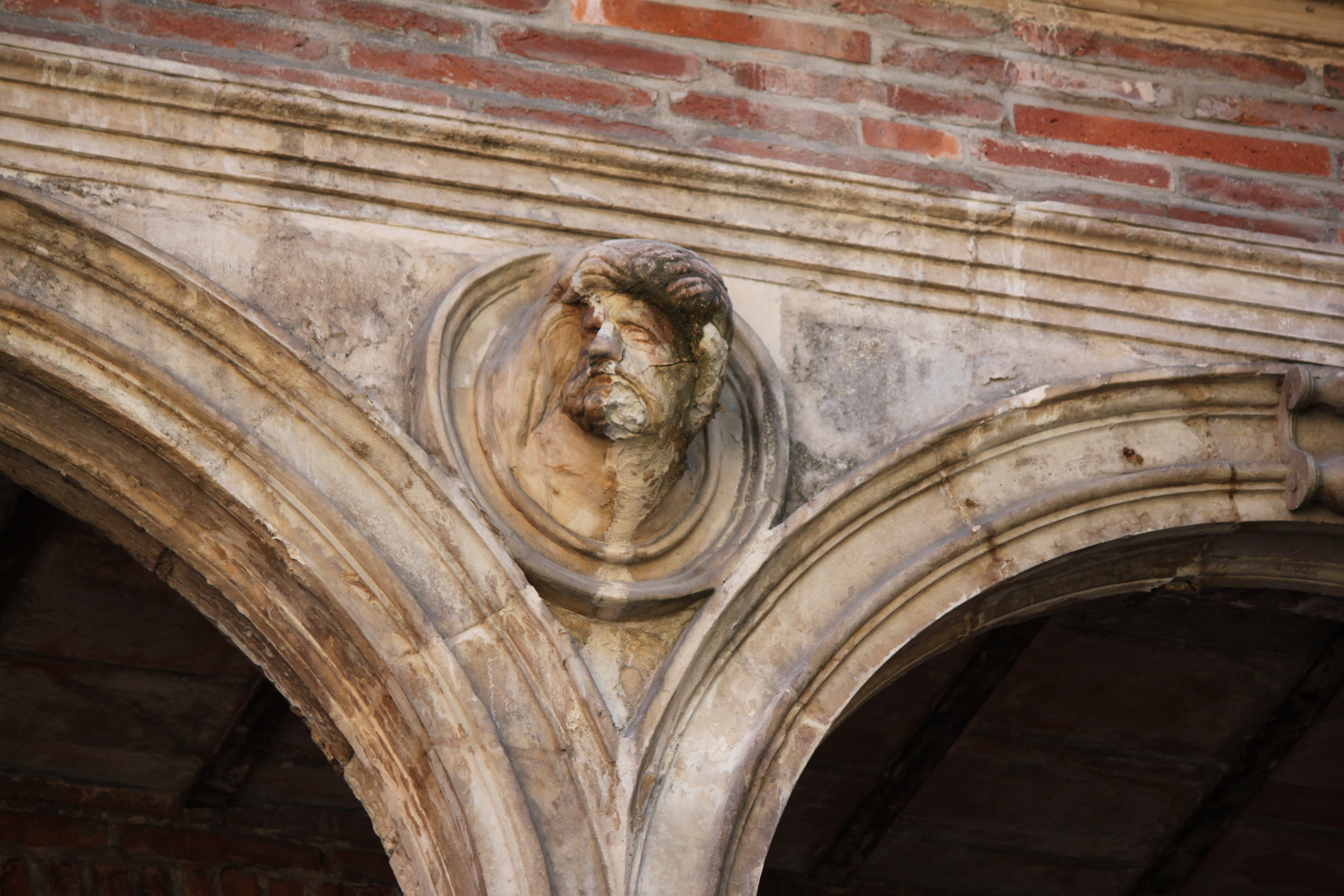

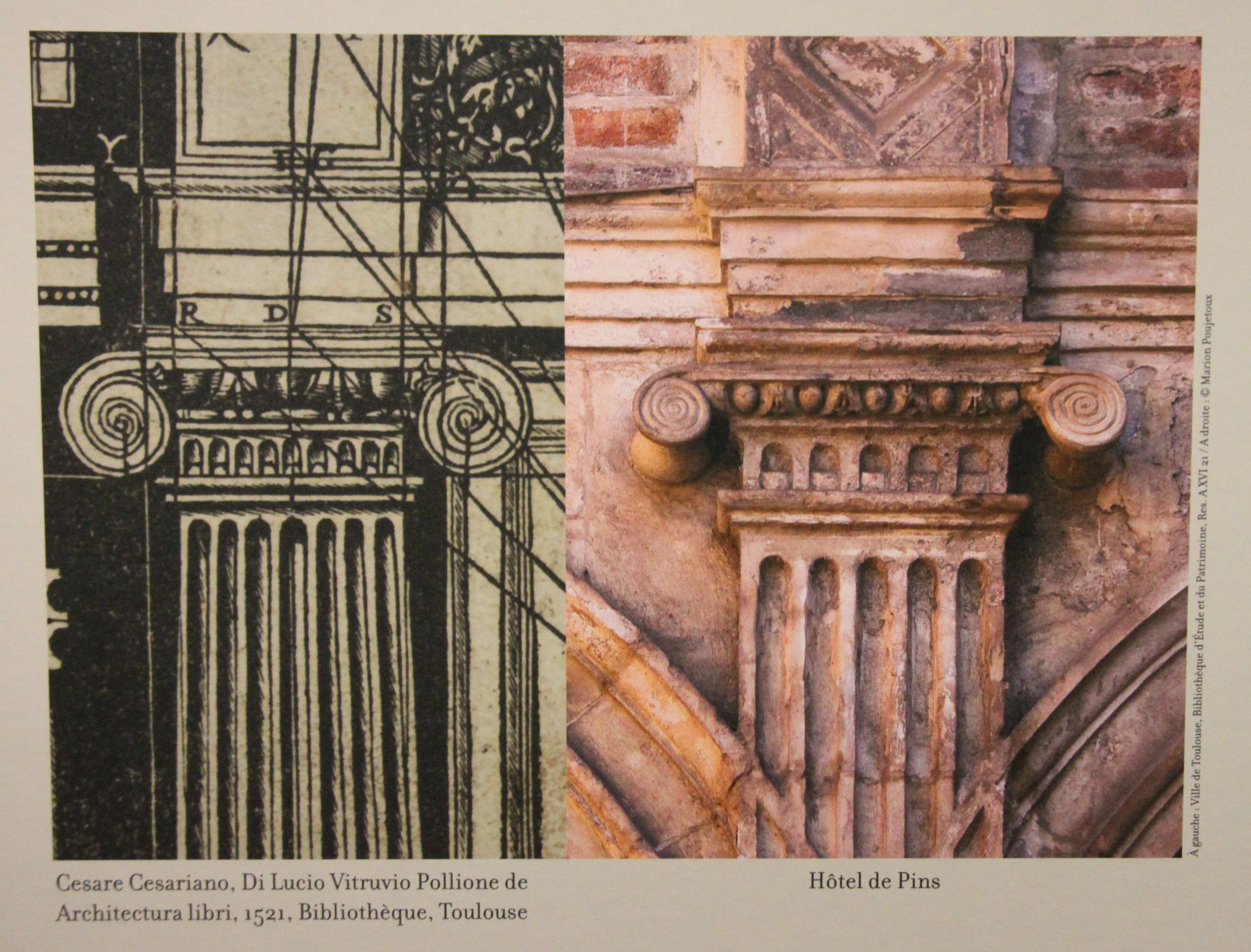

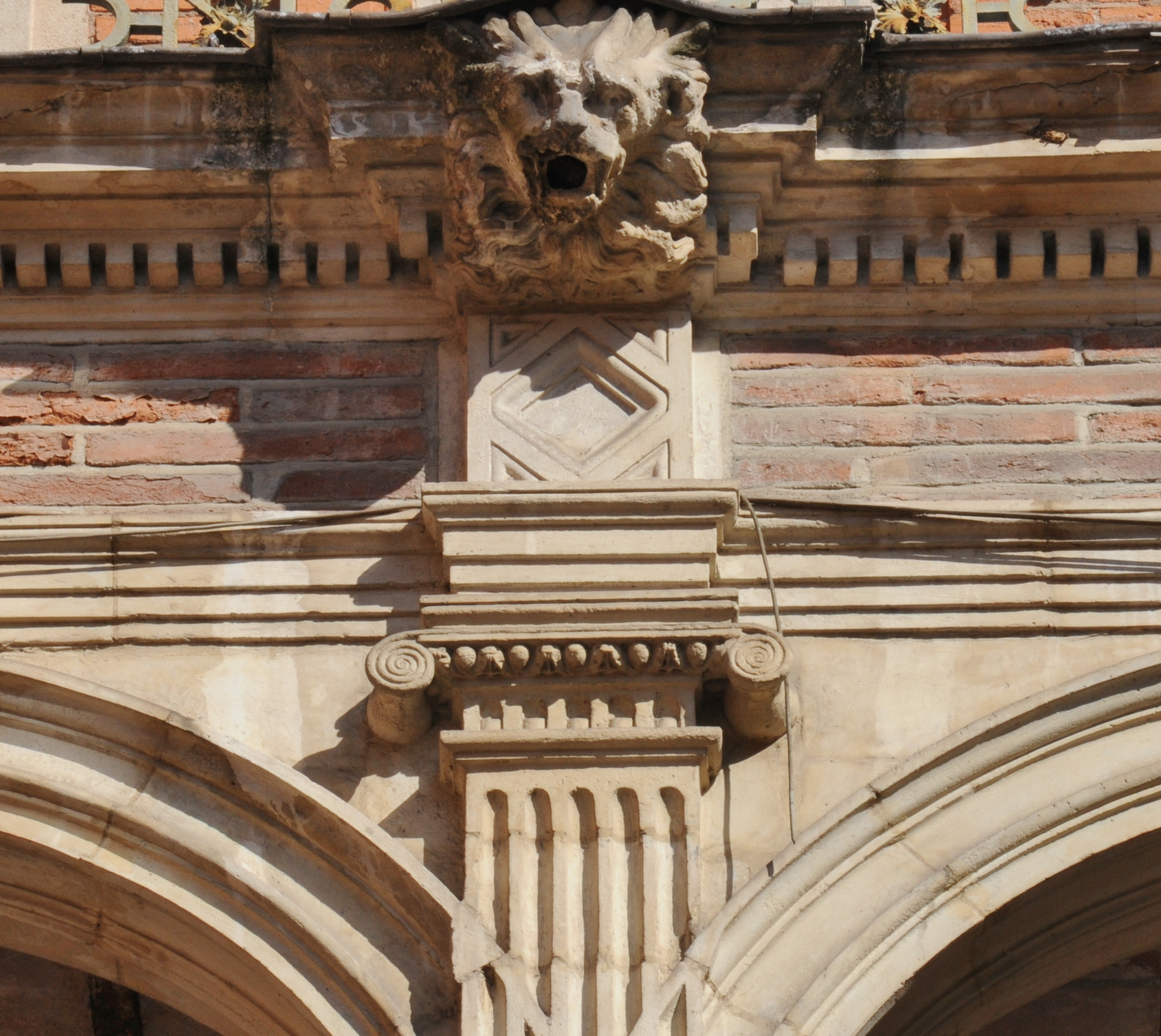

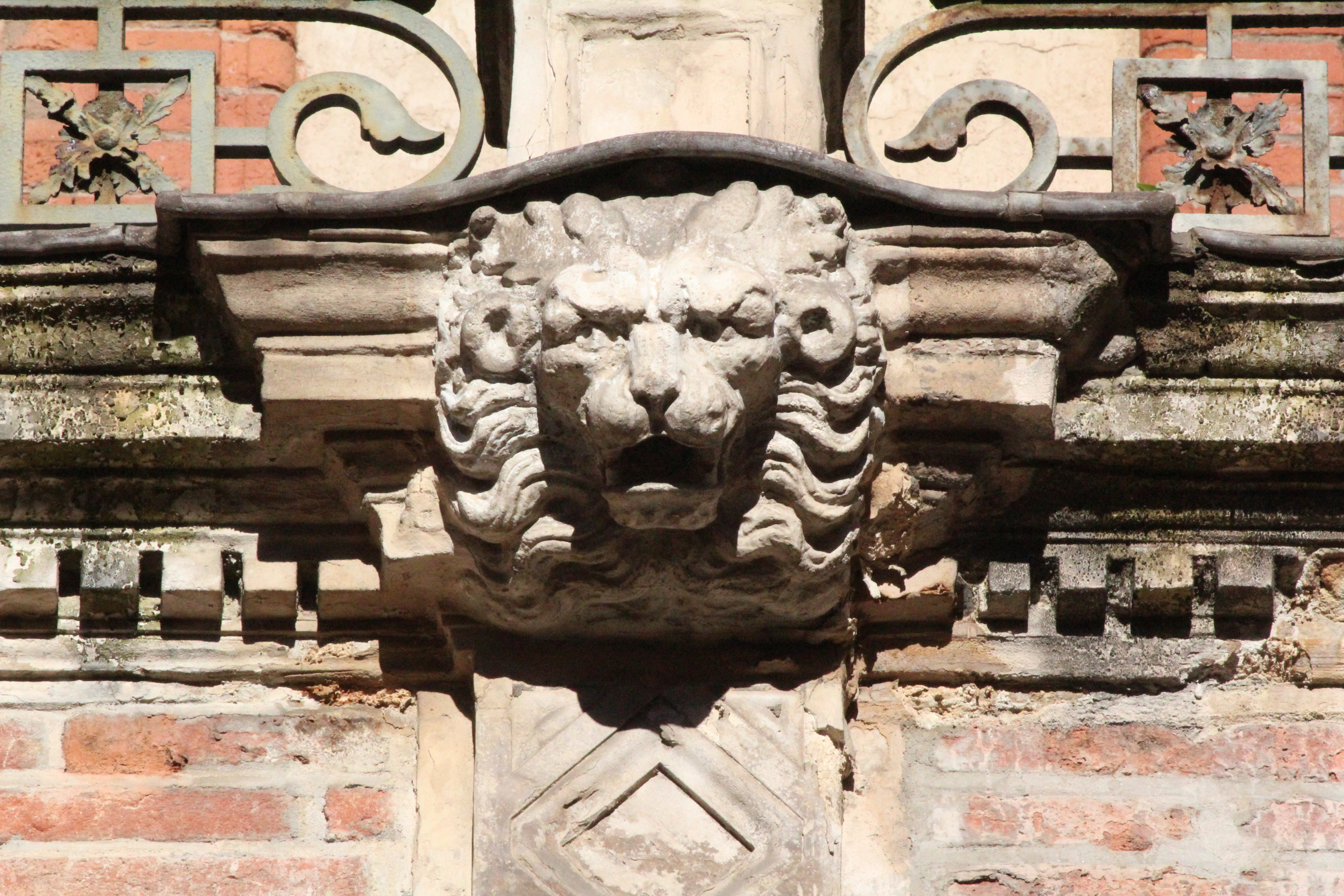

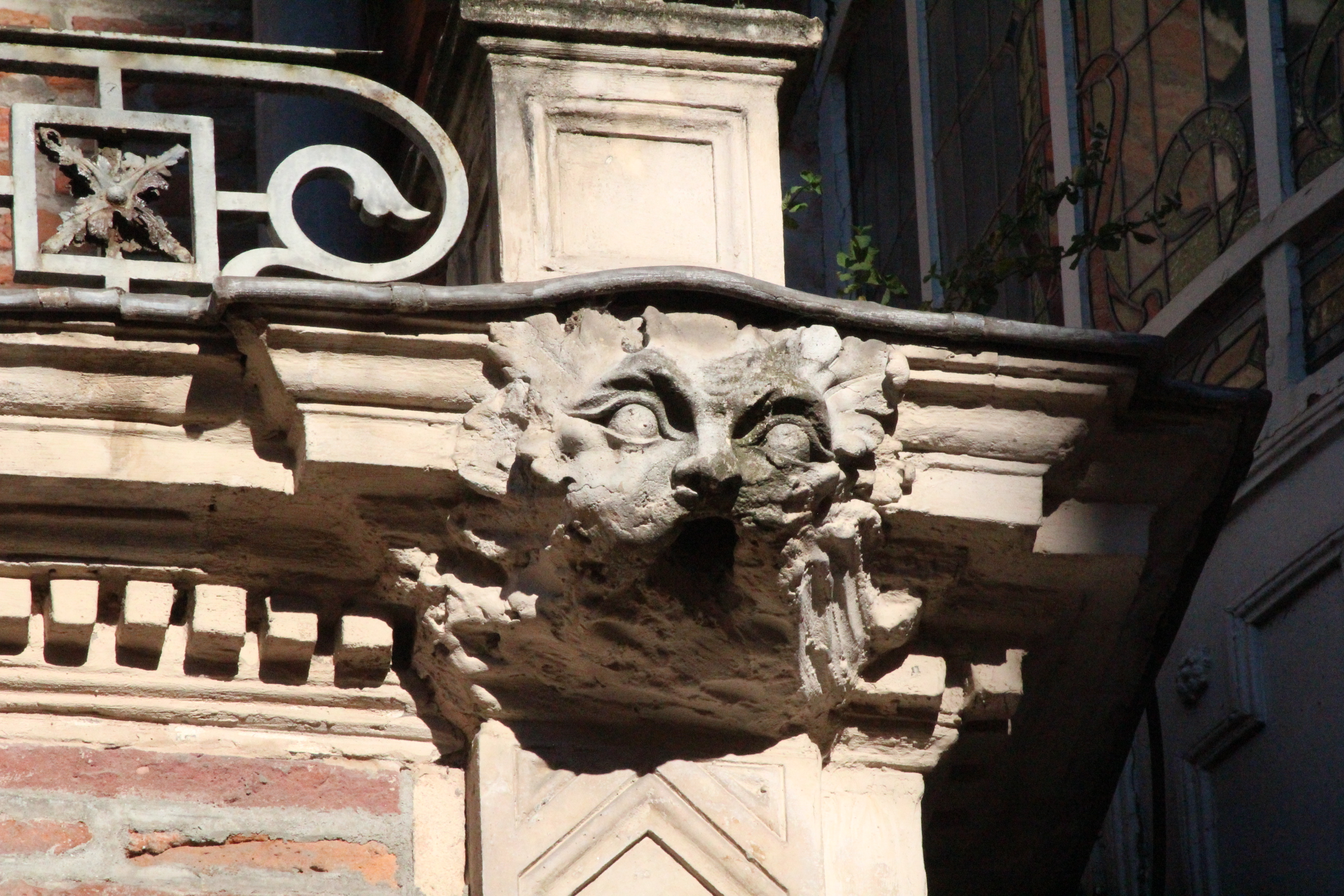

== See also ==
- Hôtel Thomas de Montval
- Renaissance architecture of Toulouse

== Bibliography ==
- Jules Chalande, « Histoire des rues de Toulouse », Mémoires de l'Académie des Sciences et Belles-Lettres de Toulouse, 12^{e} série, tome IV, Toulouse, 1926, p. 150-151.
- Guy Ahlsell de Toulza, Louis Peyrusse, Bruno Tollon, Hôtels et Demeures de Toulouse et du Midi Toulousain, Daniel Briand éditeur, Drémil Lafage, 1997
