= Hôtel du Vieux-Raisin =

16th-century palace

Coordinates: 43.5972°N 1.4458°E

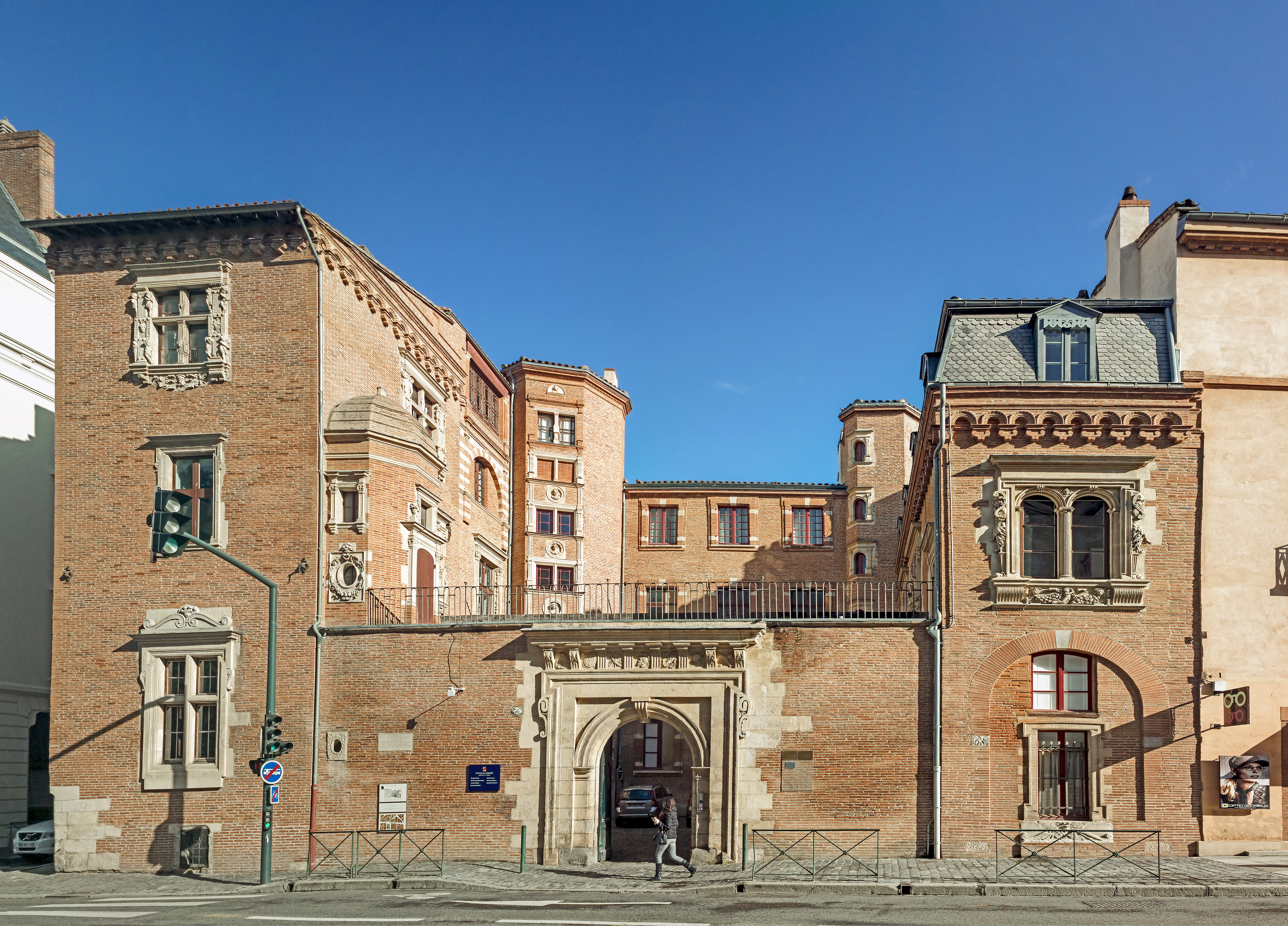
The Hôtel du Vieux Raisin.

The Hôtel du Vieux Raisin (Occitan: Ostal del Vèi-Raïç) in Toulouse, France is a Renaissance hôtel particulier (palace) of the 16th century.

This townhouse is surely one of the most beautiful private mansions of the time. It was built for Berenger Maynier, professor of law, lord of Canac and Gallice and capitoul in 1515–1516; The style chosen was that of this period, strongly influenced by Italian Renaissance architecture.

== History ==
Hôtel du Vieux Raisin is based on a fifteenth-century building, which stood on the huge plot of the neighbouring Hôtel Dahus and was later partially demolished to make way for Rue Ozenne. Dating from this period are the embrasures and gargoyles in the upper part of the façade that looks over Rue José Félix.

In 1515, lawyer Béringuier Maynier purchased the house and undertook building restoration. A new house was added to the original building, to separate the courtyard from the garden, and given a staircase tower on either side. The house was extended with two short wings. In the courtyard, on the side adjoining the garden and Rue José Félix, many richly decorated windows were installed. Busts medallions were placed between the openings on the great tower in the courtyard.

From 1547 to 1577 the house was owned by magistrate Jean Burnet. The main courtyard took on an idealized form (square) with the extensions of the wings. The entrance was closed off with a portico inspired by the loggia of the Hôtel d'Assézat (Doric columns, mixture of brick and stone). The coffers continue to show Burnet's arms and those of his wife.

Next, Pierre de Lancrau, a bishop who owned the property between 1580 and 1591, heightened the great staircase tower and installed in the main courtyard several windows featuring telamons.

== Street windows ==
Due to the absence of nearby stone quarries, the predominant building material in Toulouse was brick, so adding a stone window to a house was an effective way of displaying success and social rank, such features attracting the eyes of passers-by. The various owners of the hôtel were consistent in the care they took over the decoration of the windows. On rue Ozenne, the windows commissioned by Béringuier Maynier feature magnificent pilasters, candelabra and rinceaux. On rue du Languedoc, a sculpted window commissioned by Jean Burnet between 1547 and 1555 took inspiration from an engraving by the architect Jacques Androuet du Cerceau. It retains the general composition of the engraving but simplifies the upper section and adds sculpted human and hybrid figures. This window had its admirers because in 1555 the parliamentarian Pierre de Nos copied it for the castle on his estate.

== Courtyard ornaments ==
In the courtyard, some of the telamon windows can be attributed to Nicolas Bachelier. Those of the ground floor belong to another hand and date from the late sixteenth century. On the first floor, the figures supporting the entablatures of the windows seem to be straining under the weight. On the ground floor, the hybrid figures with lion feet or on pilasters show exceptional diversity as well as great anatomical and psychological realism. Imprisoned in the stone, they bear their burden with dignity and solemnity.

Other sculpted motifs abound in the frames and reference royal buildings, such as the Francis I Gallery at the Palace of Fontainebleau, and sometimes even draw inspiration from the famous works of Benvenuto Cellini and Michelangelo.

== The fireplace ==
Focal point for pomp, a sumptuous fireplace displays a classical vocabulary, and thus demonstrates the humanist knowledge of Béringuier Maynier. At the center of the frieze, two kneeling putti present the owner's arms in a floral wreath (called 'triumphal garland'). Medallions framed with triumphal garlands or supported by hybrid beings, chubby cherubs playing with an imposing garland of fruits and vegetables on the pediment: the iconographic work constitutes a panegyric of fortune, abundance and fertility.

== Pictures ==
Hôtel du Vieux Raisin

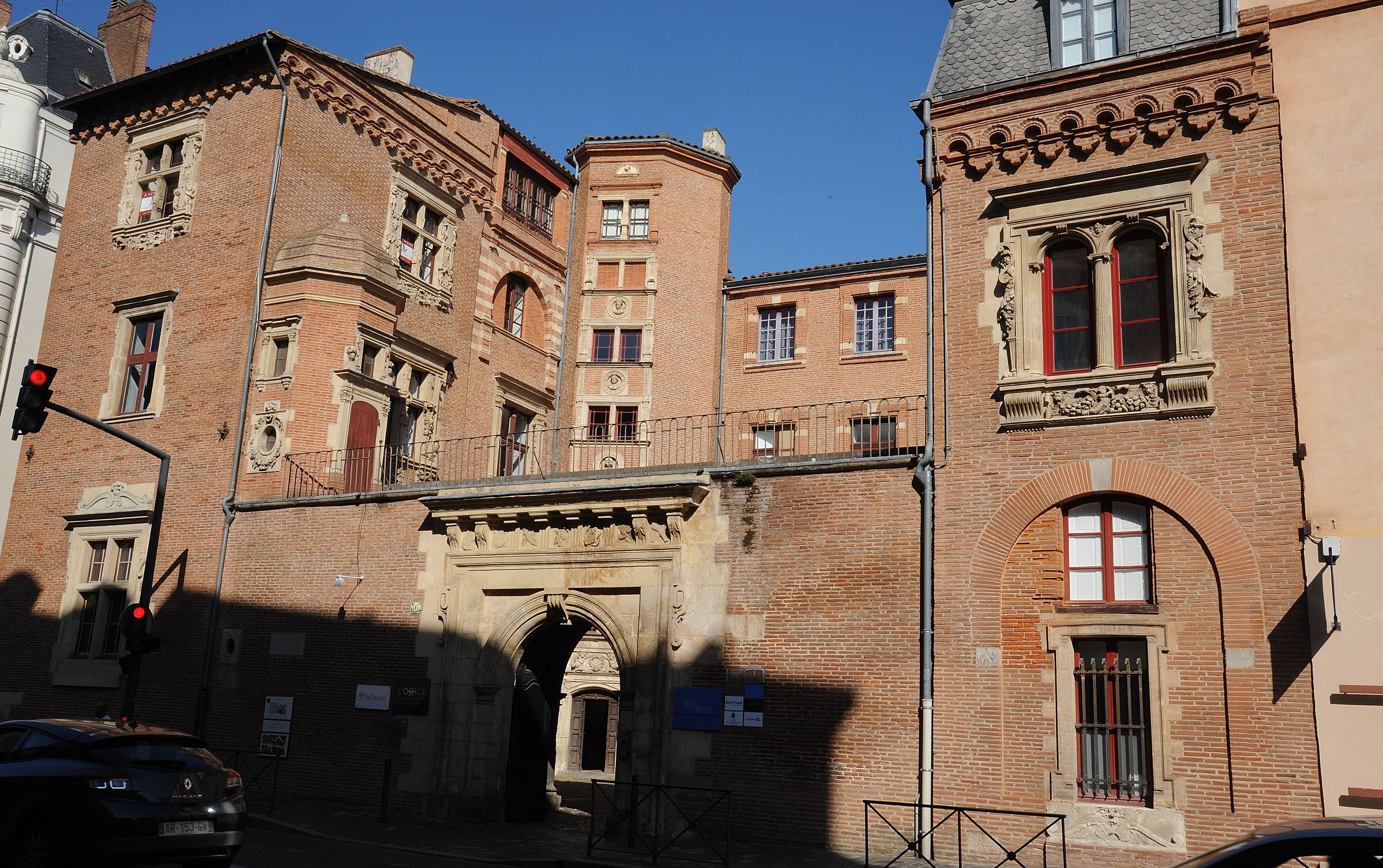

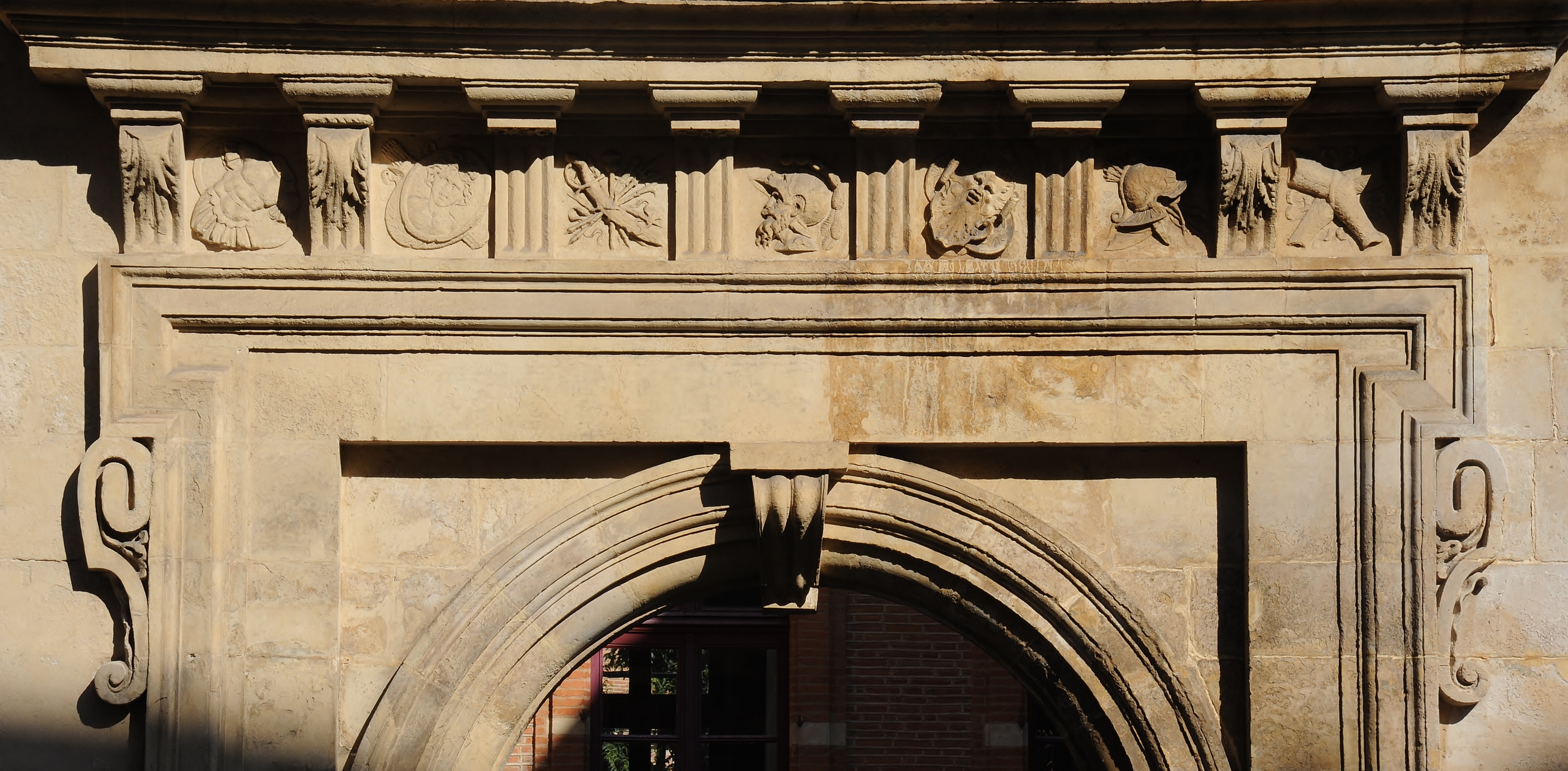

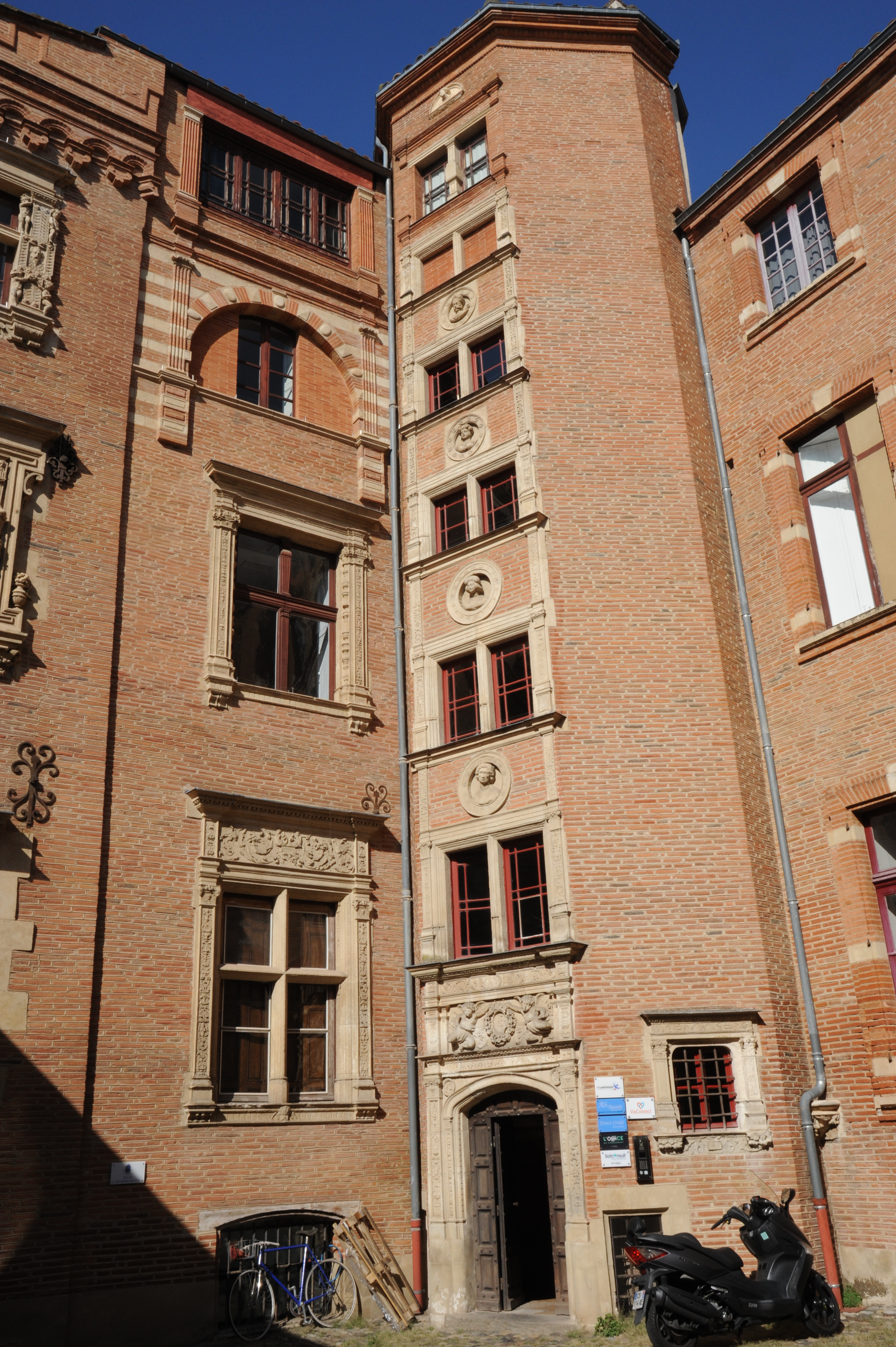

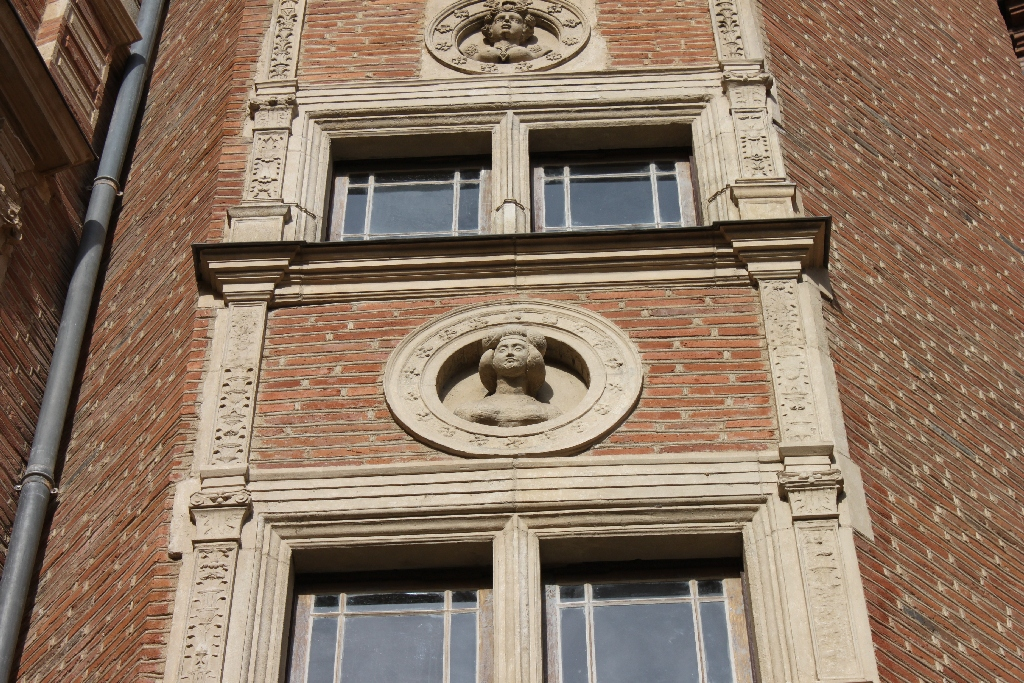

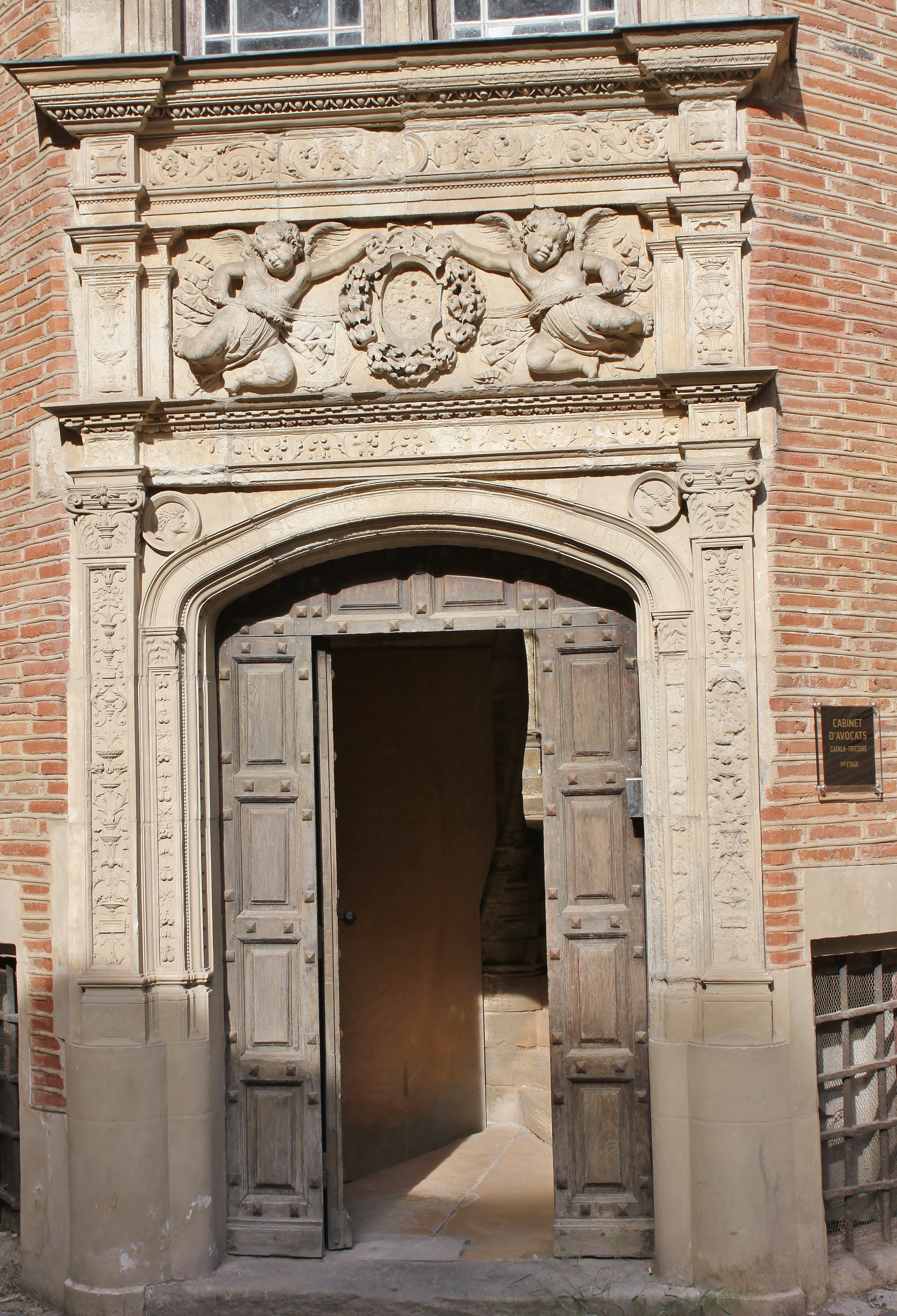

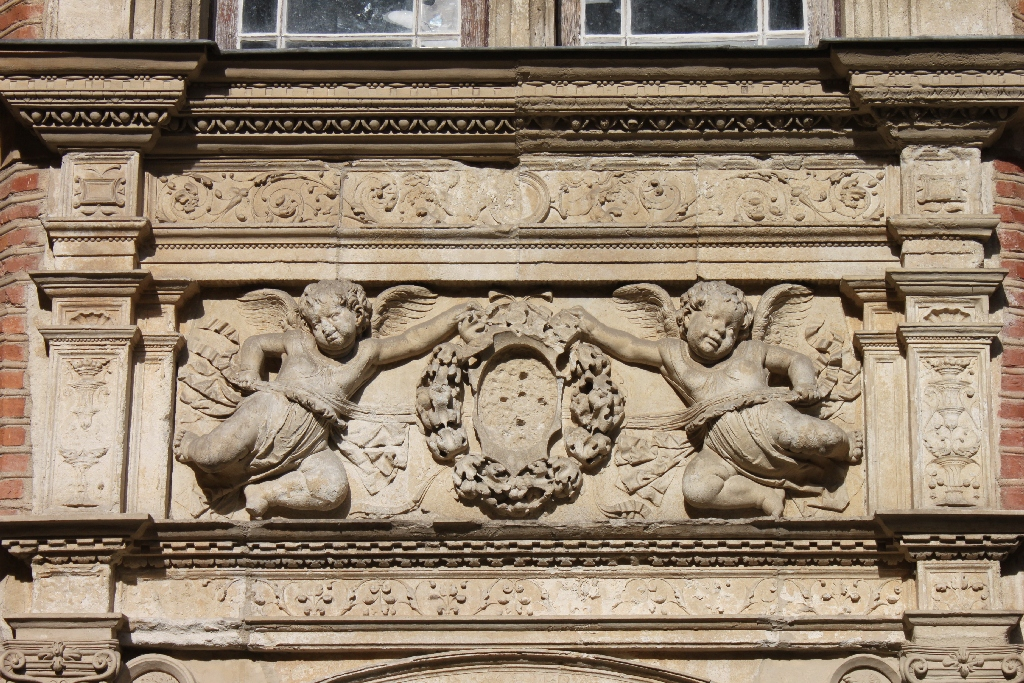

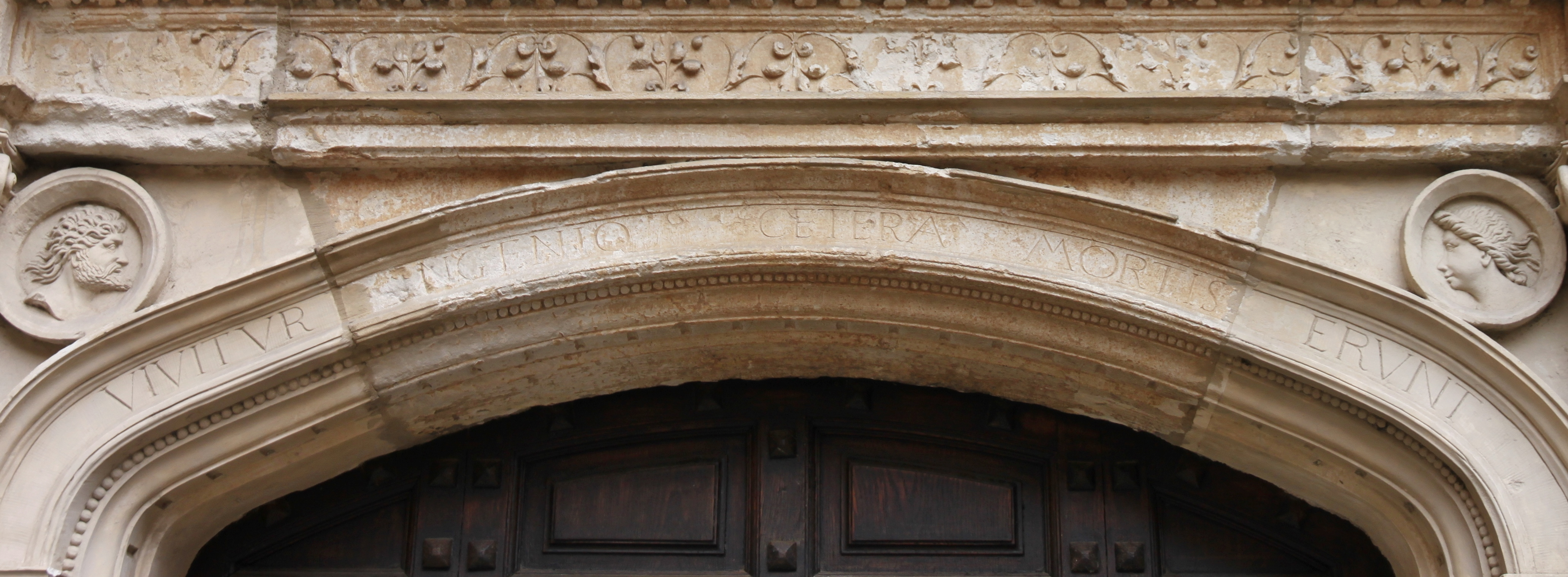

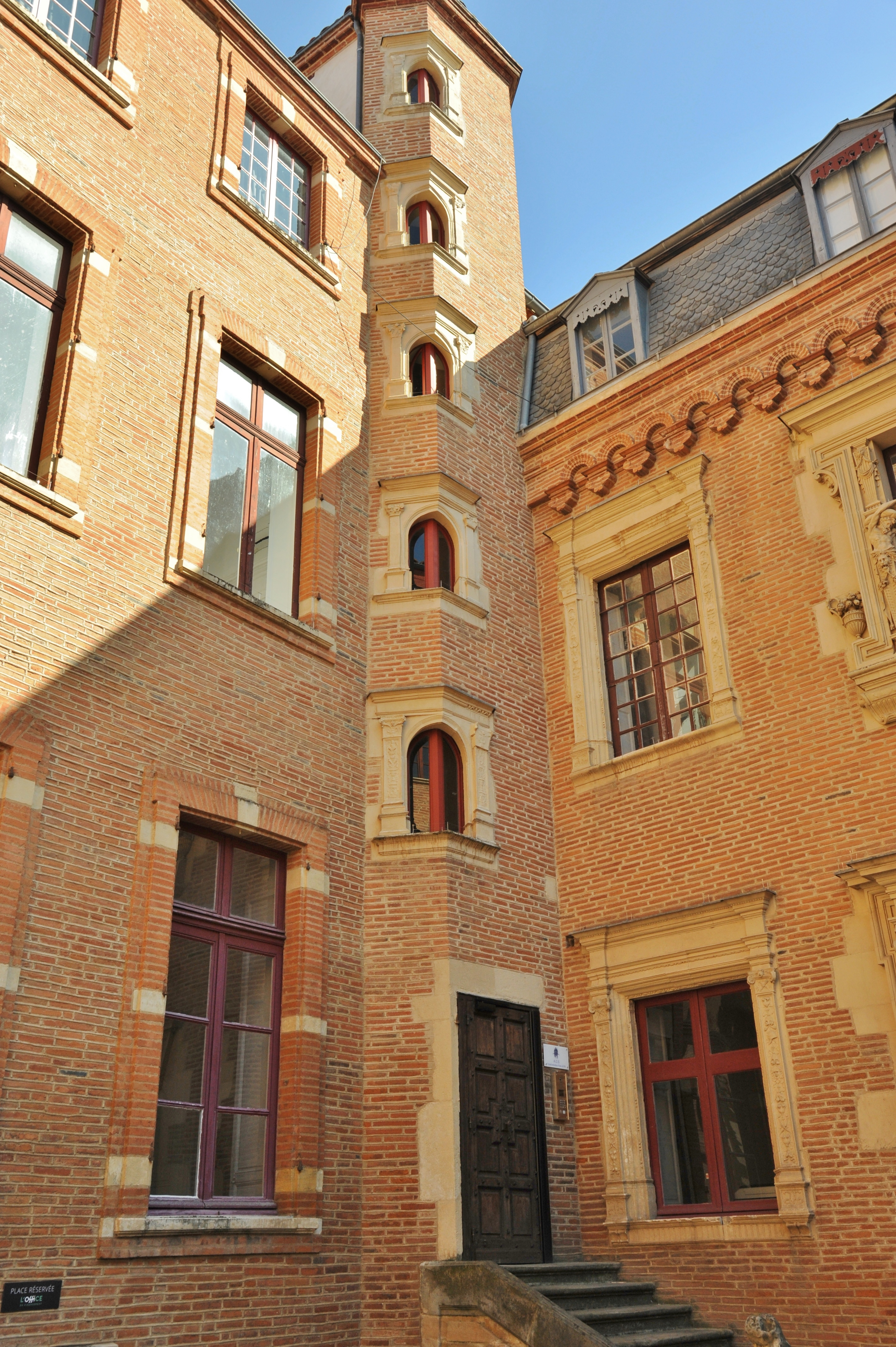

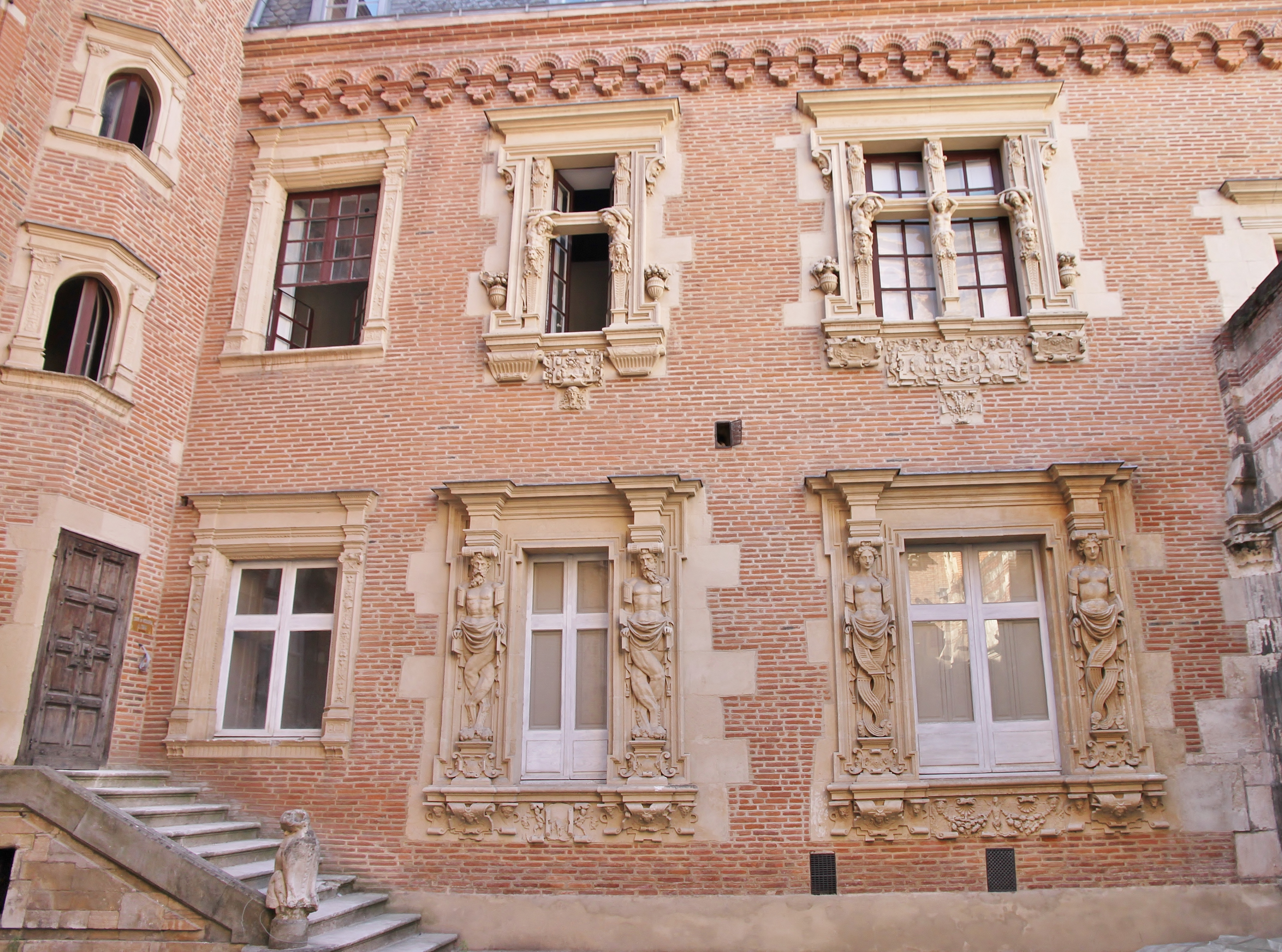

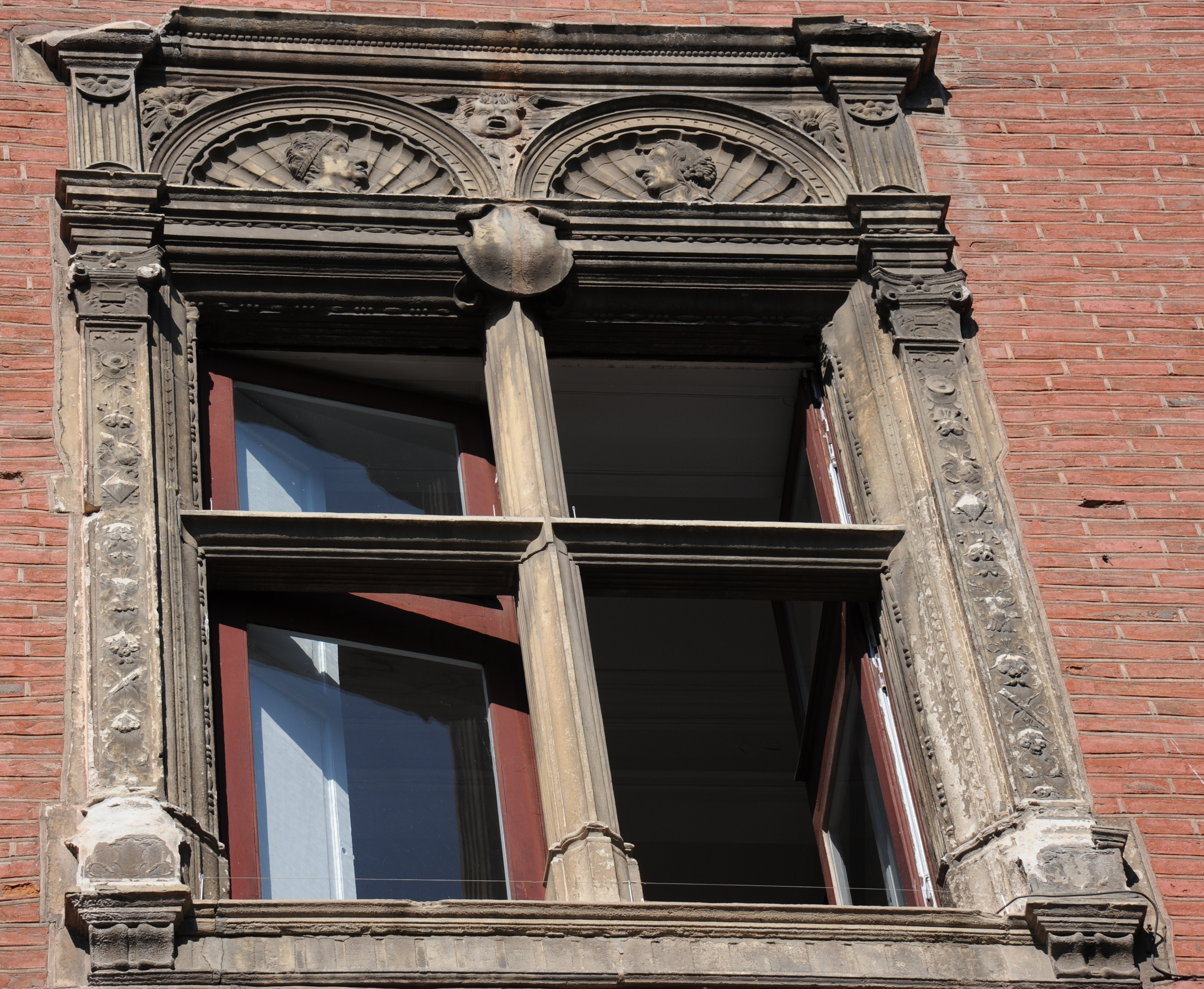

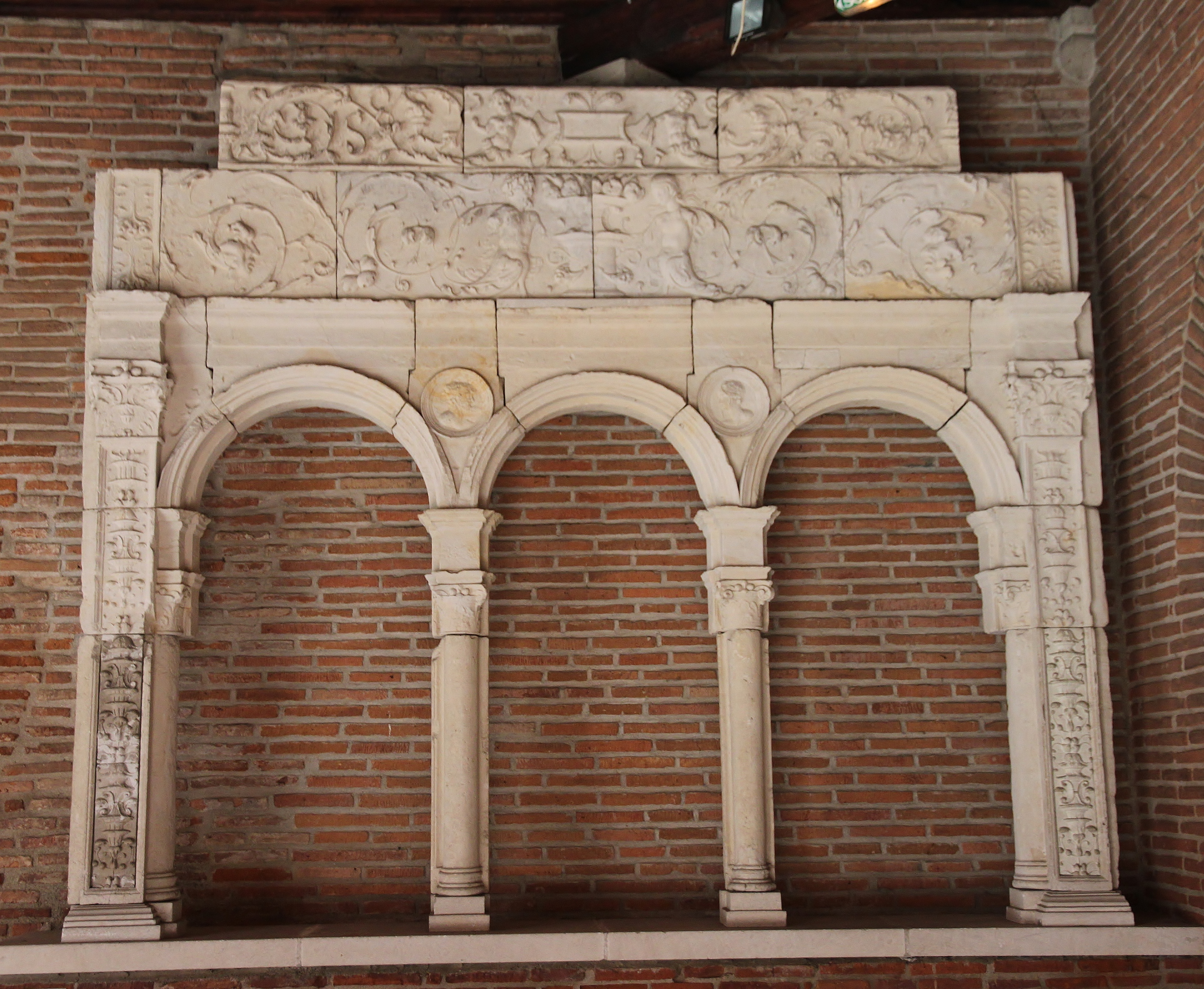

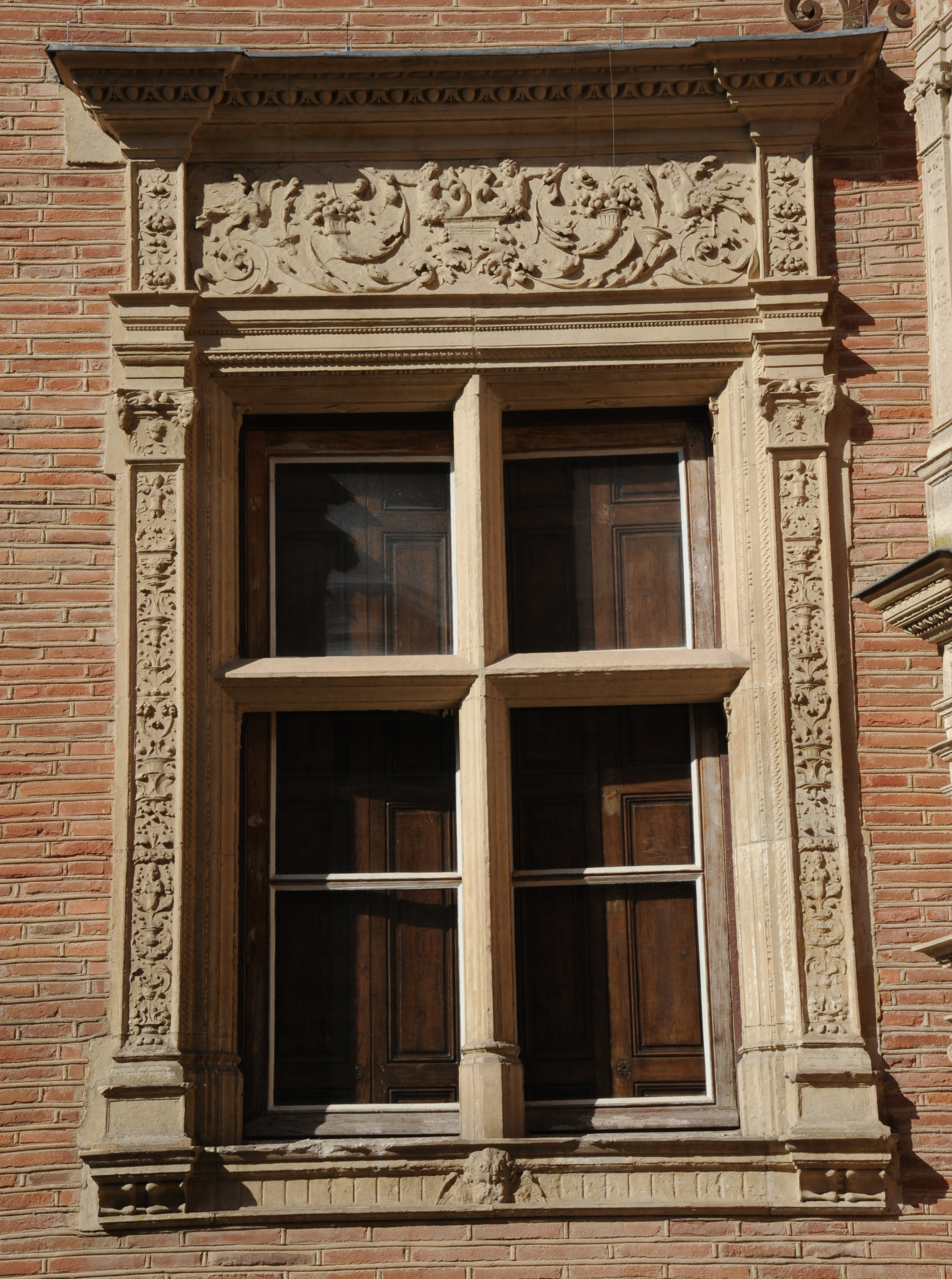

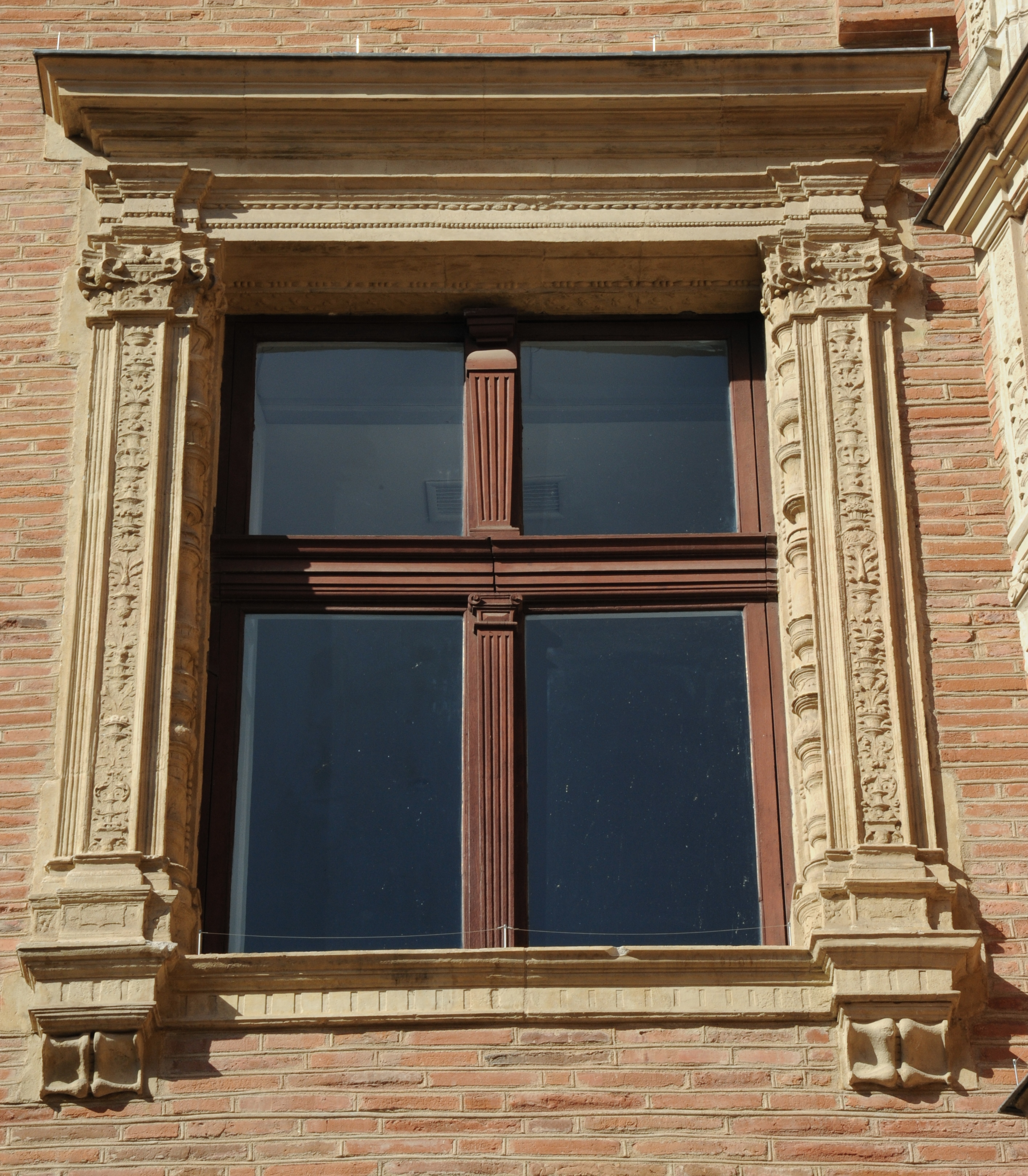

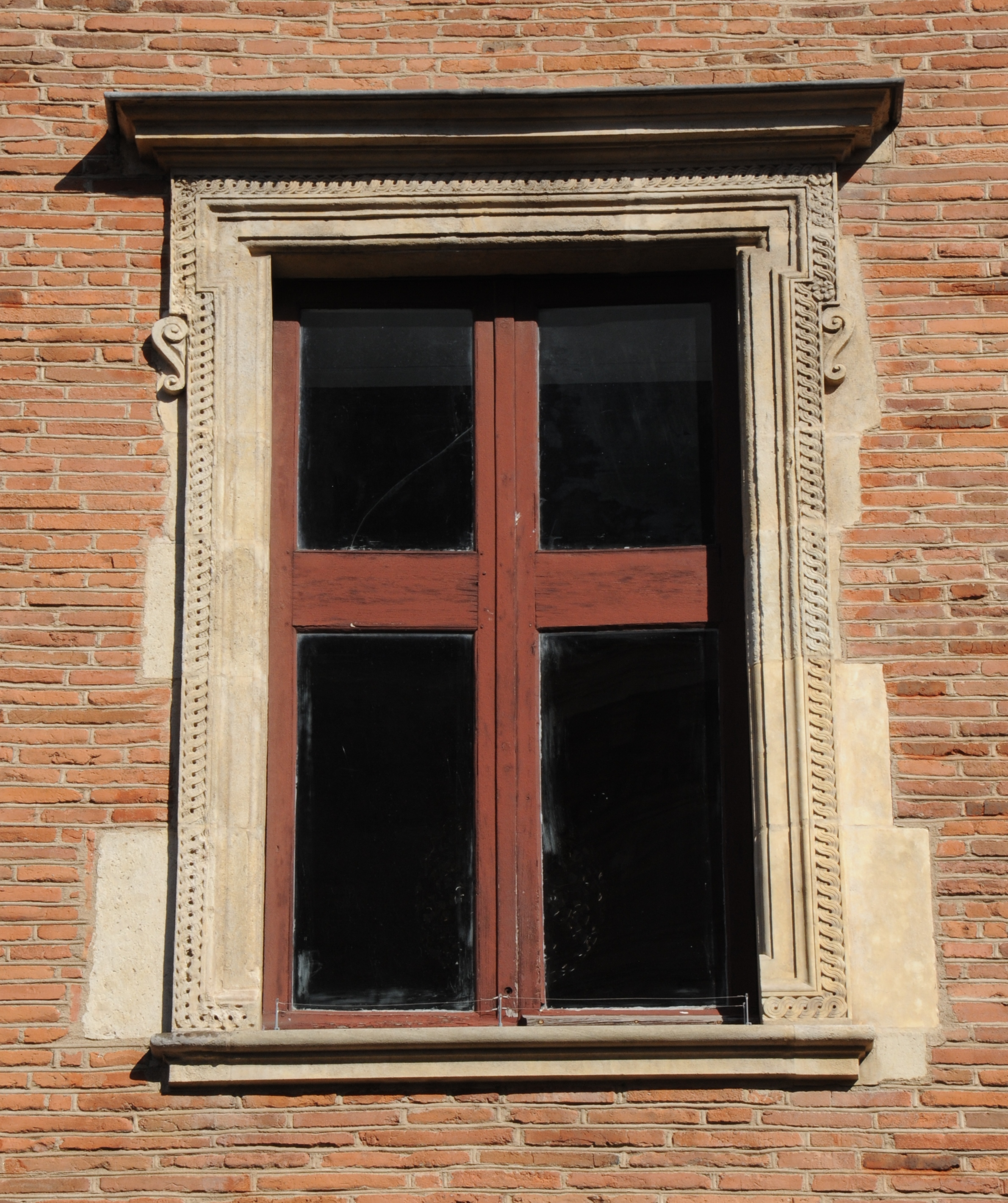

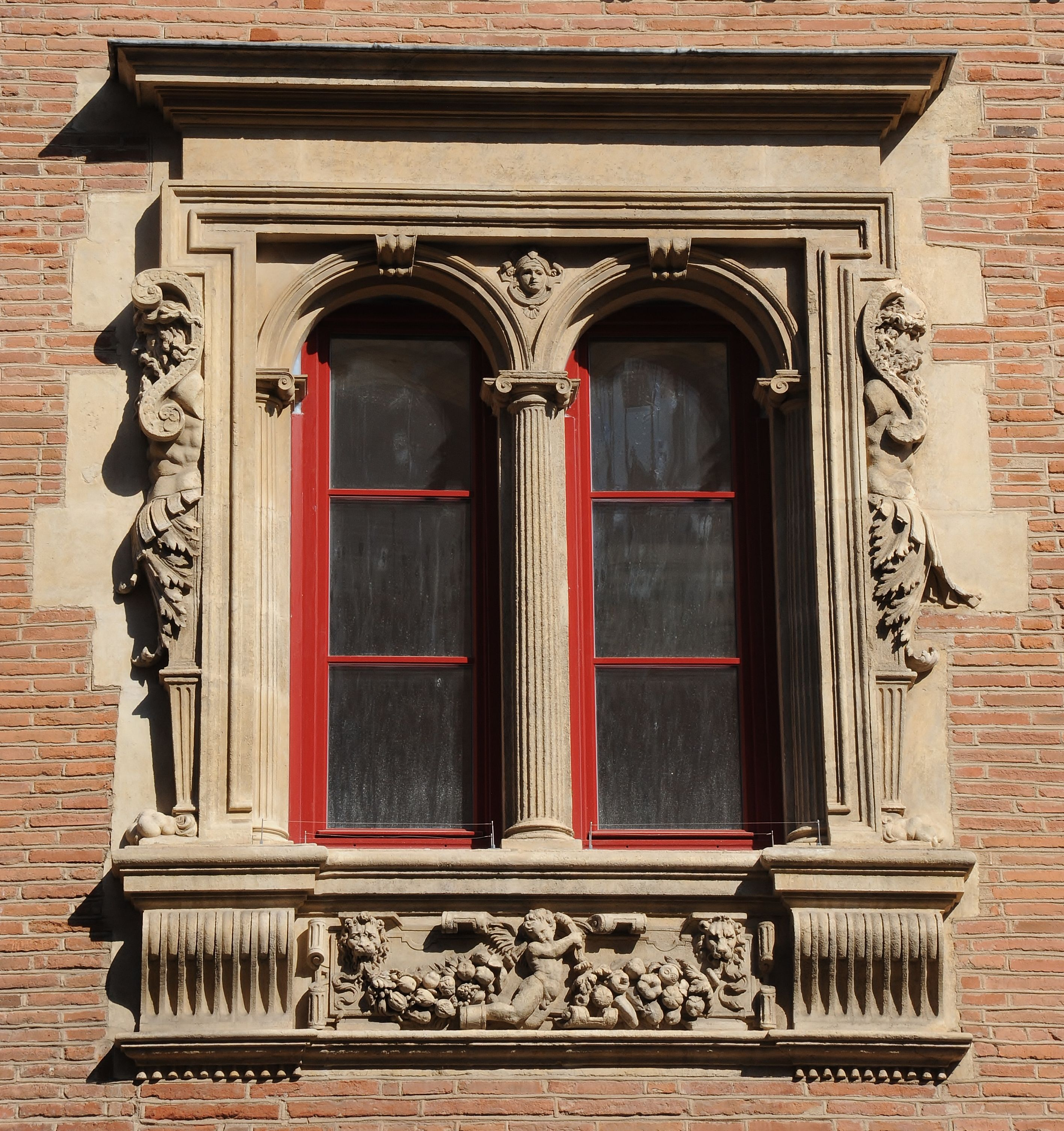

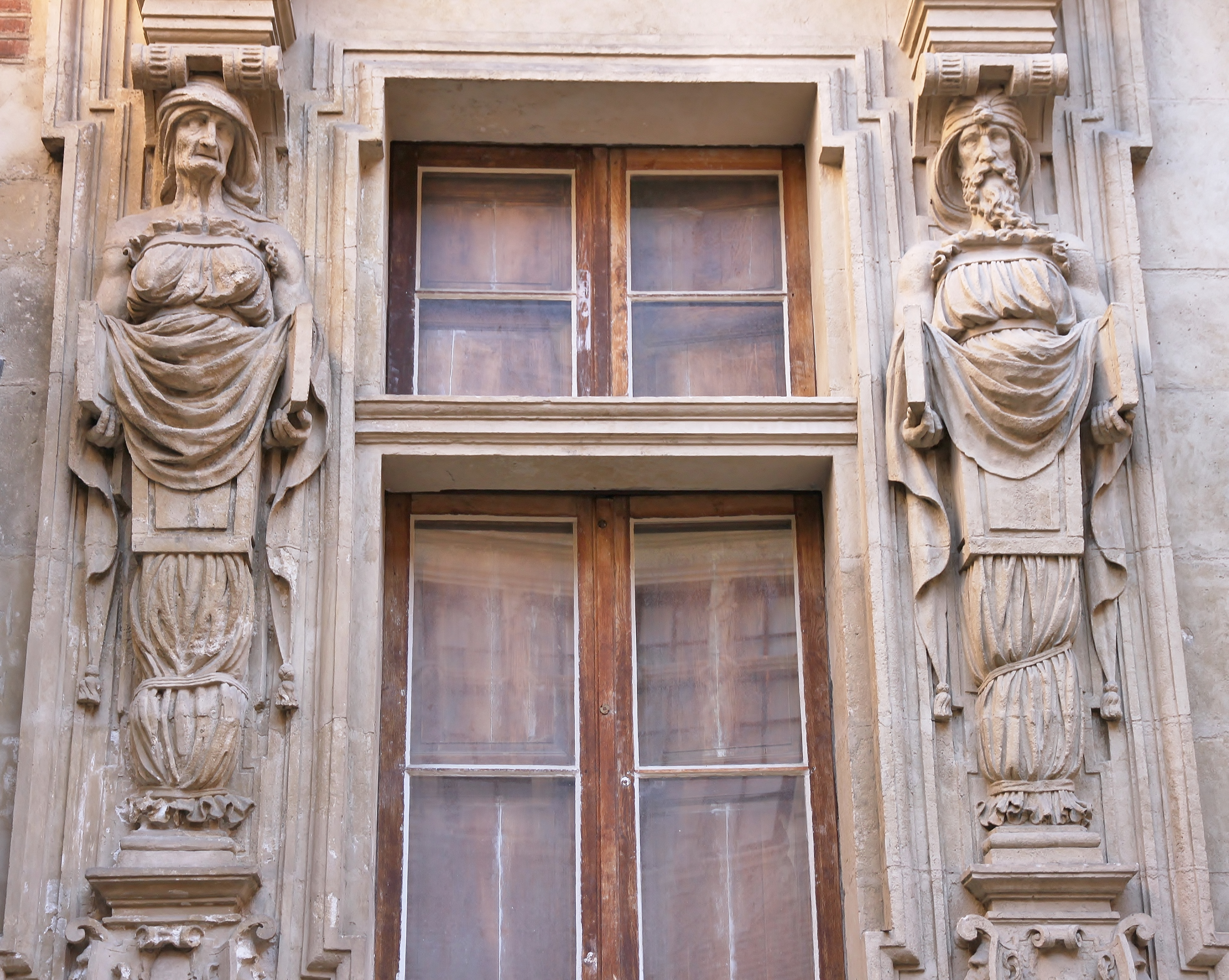

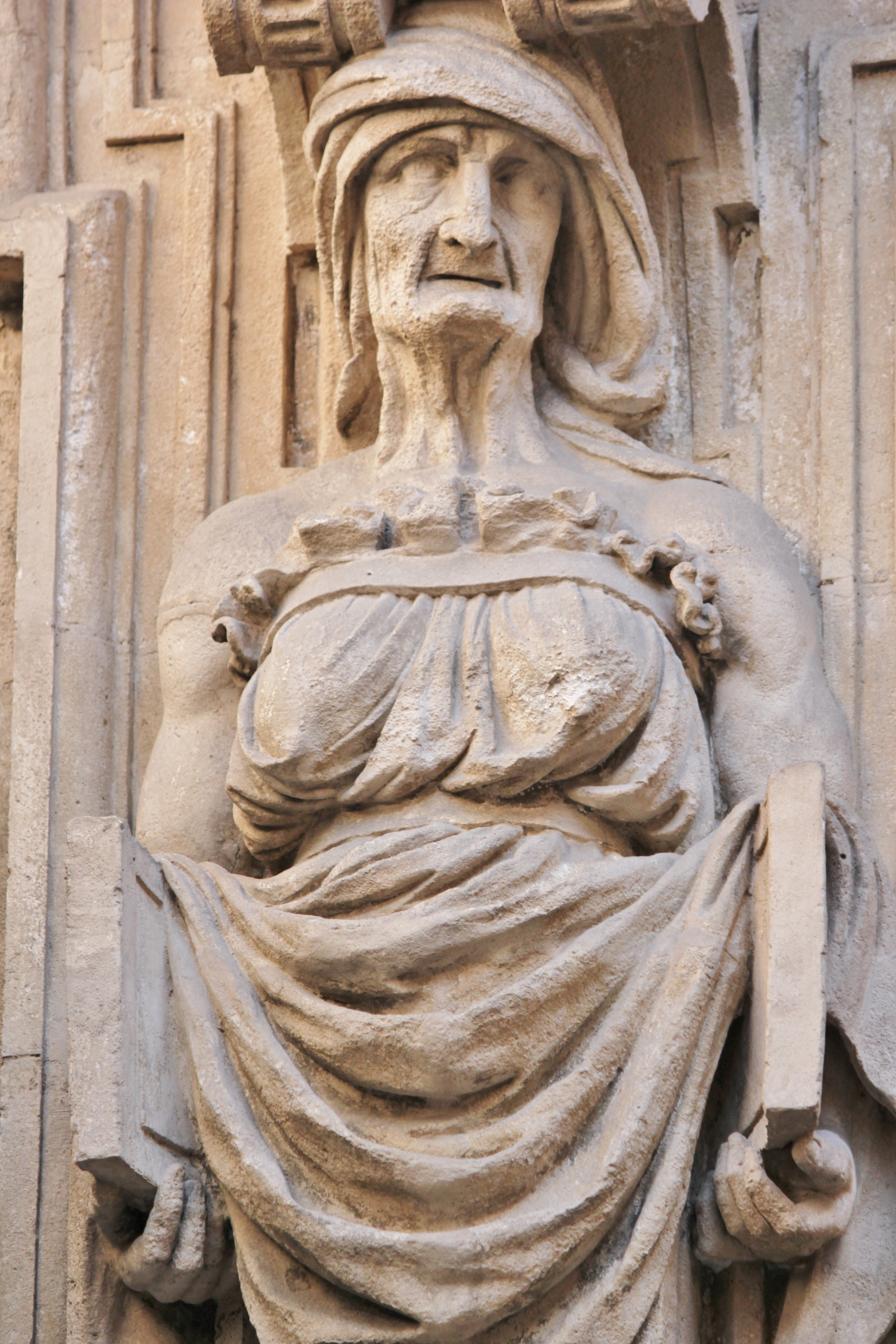

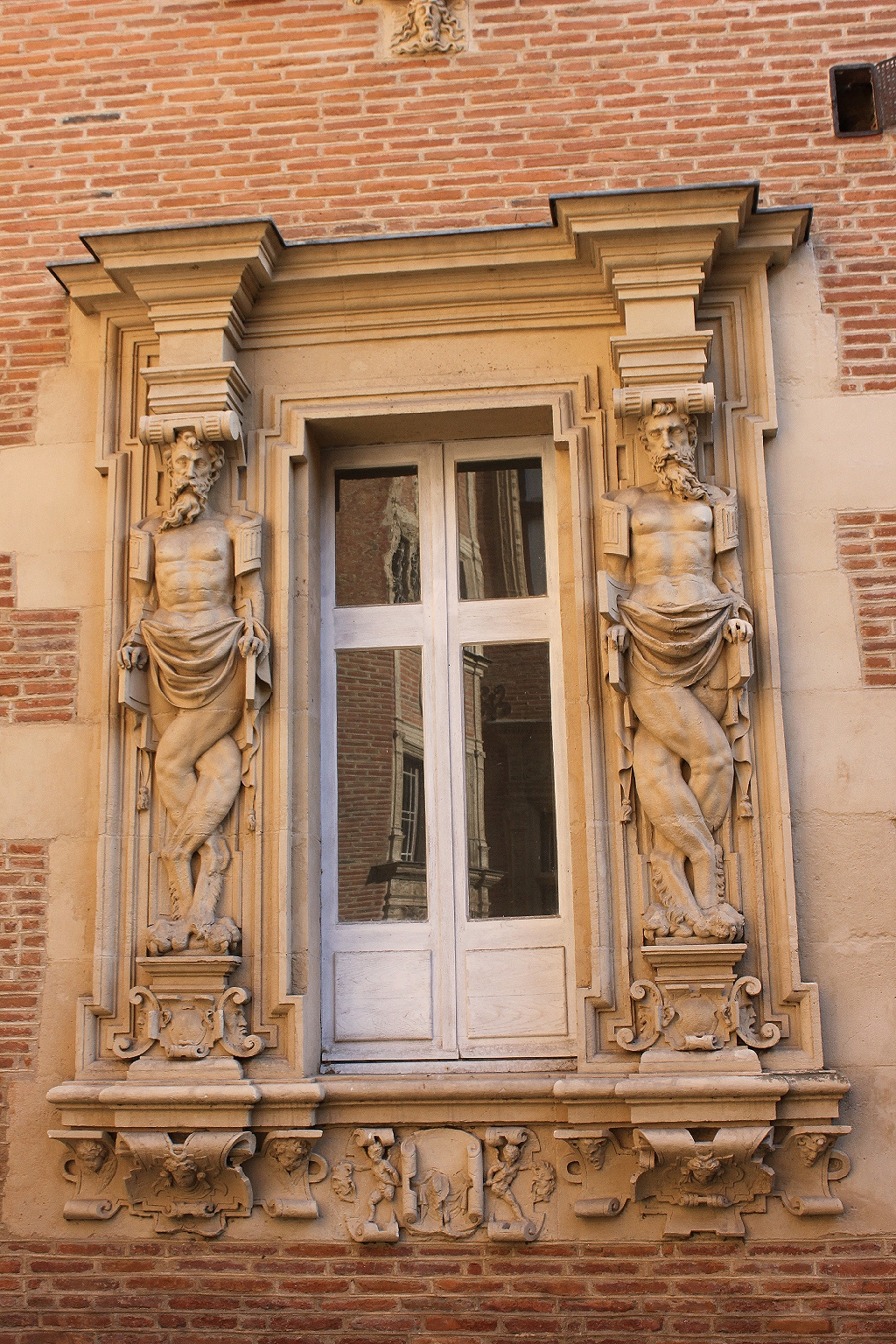

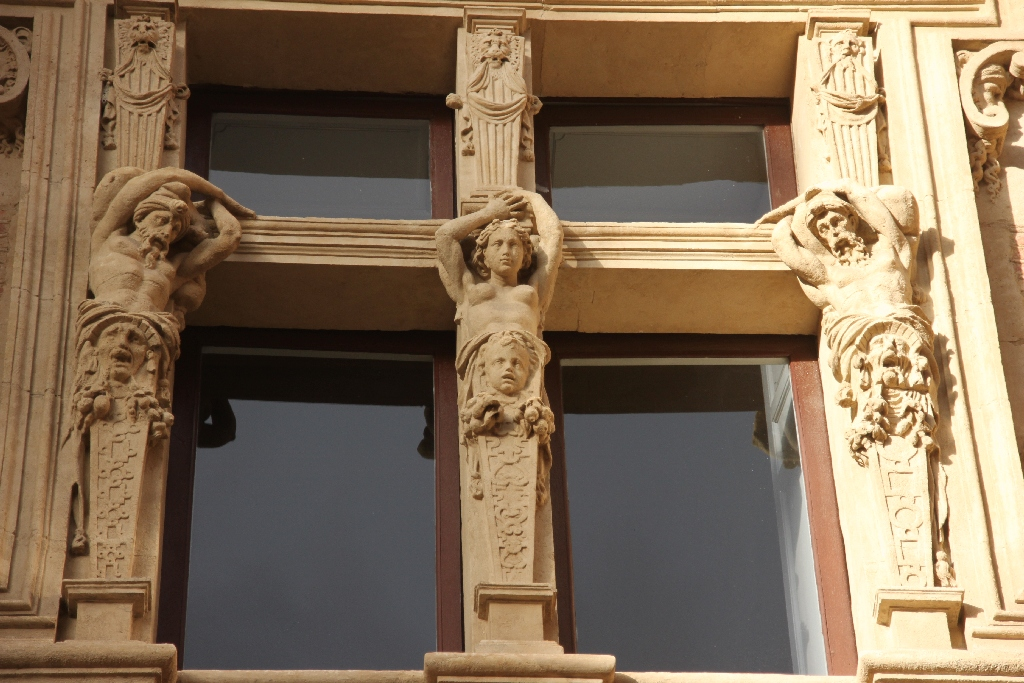

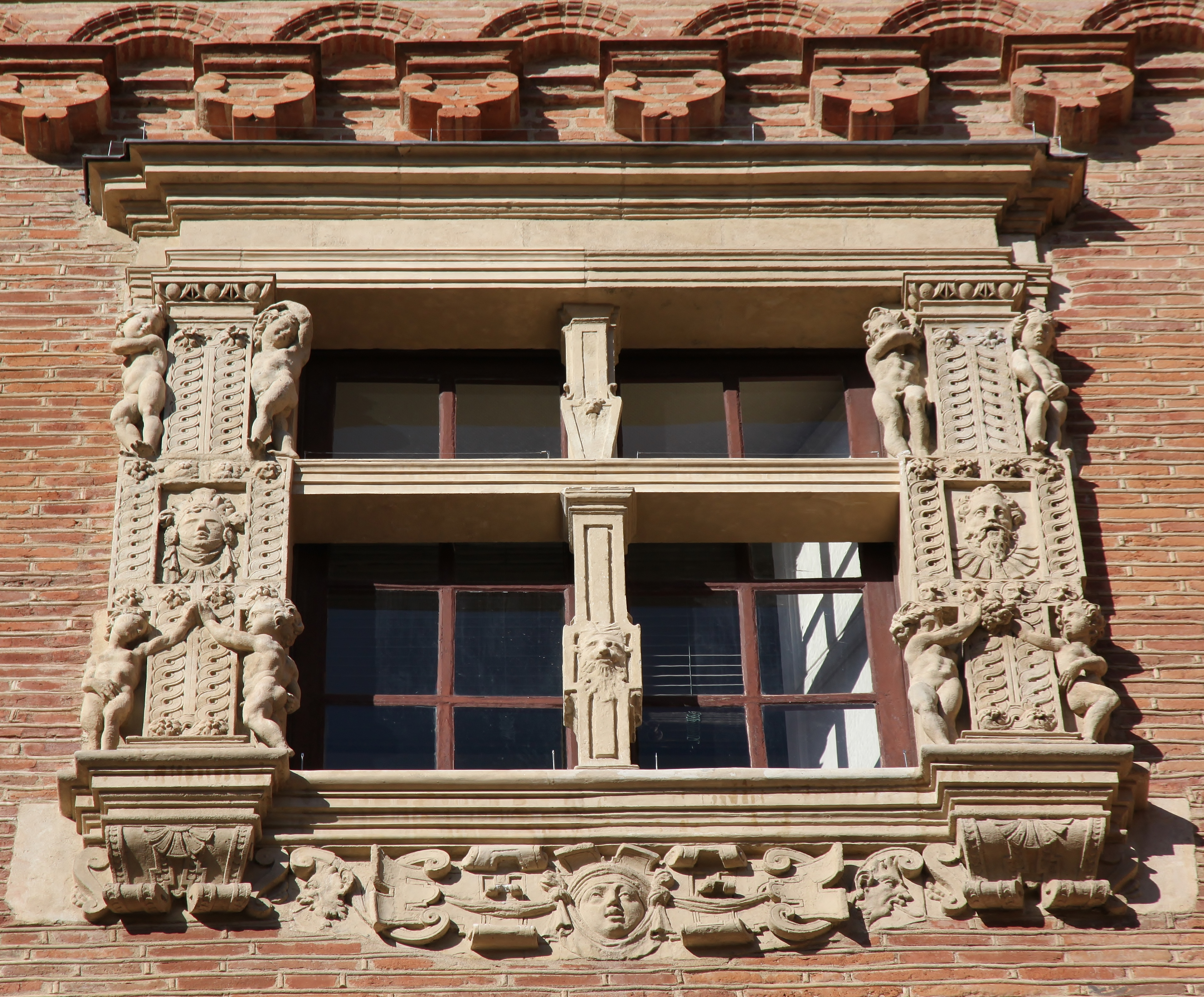

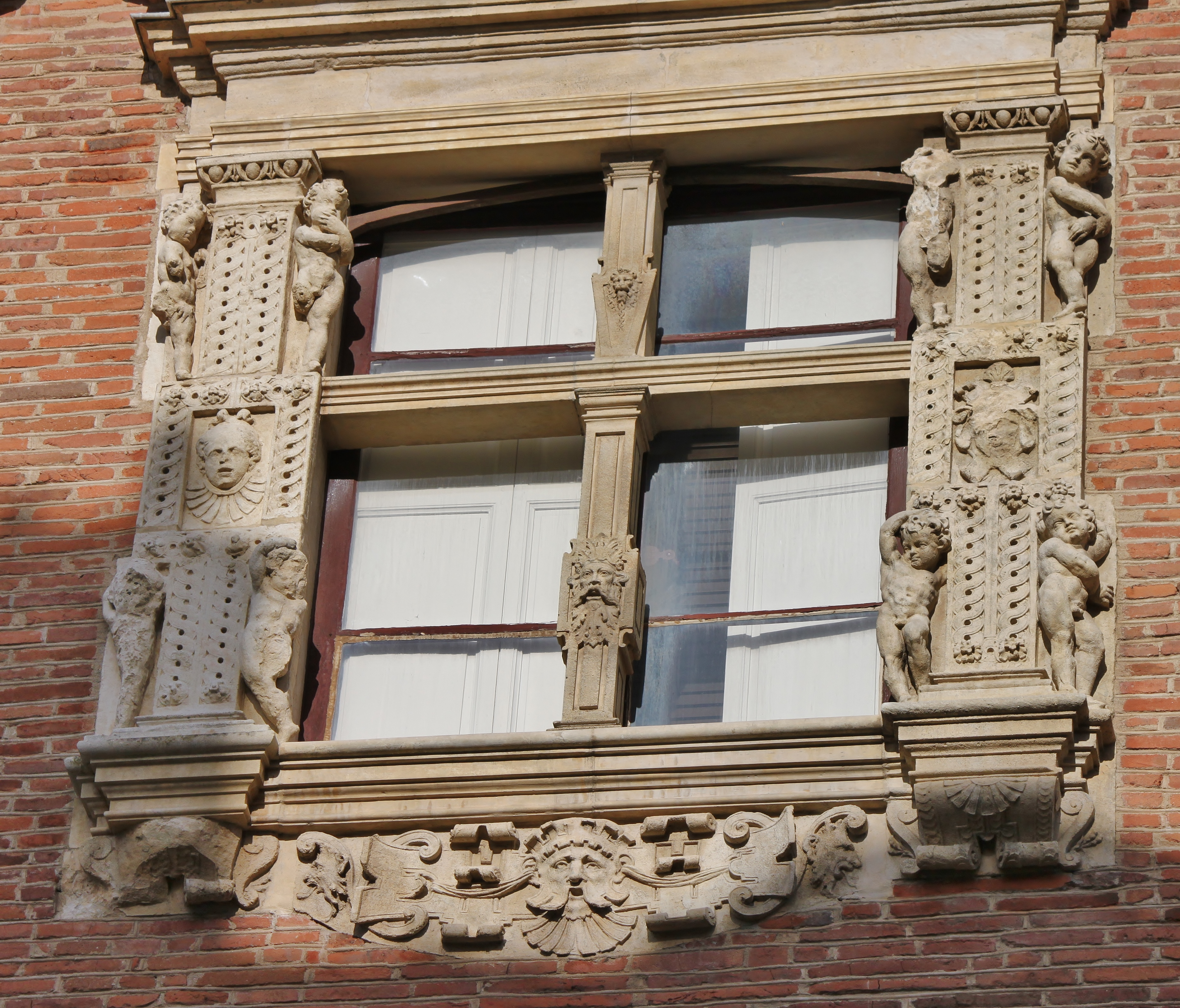

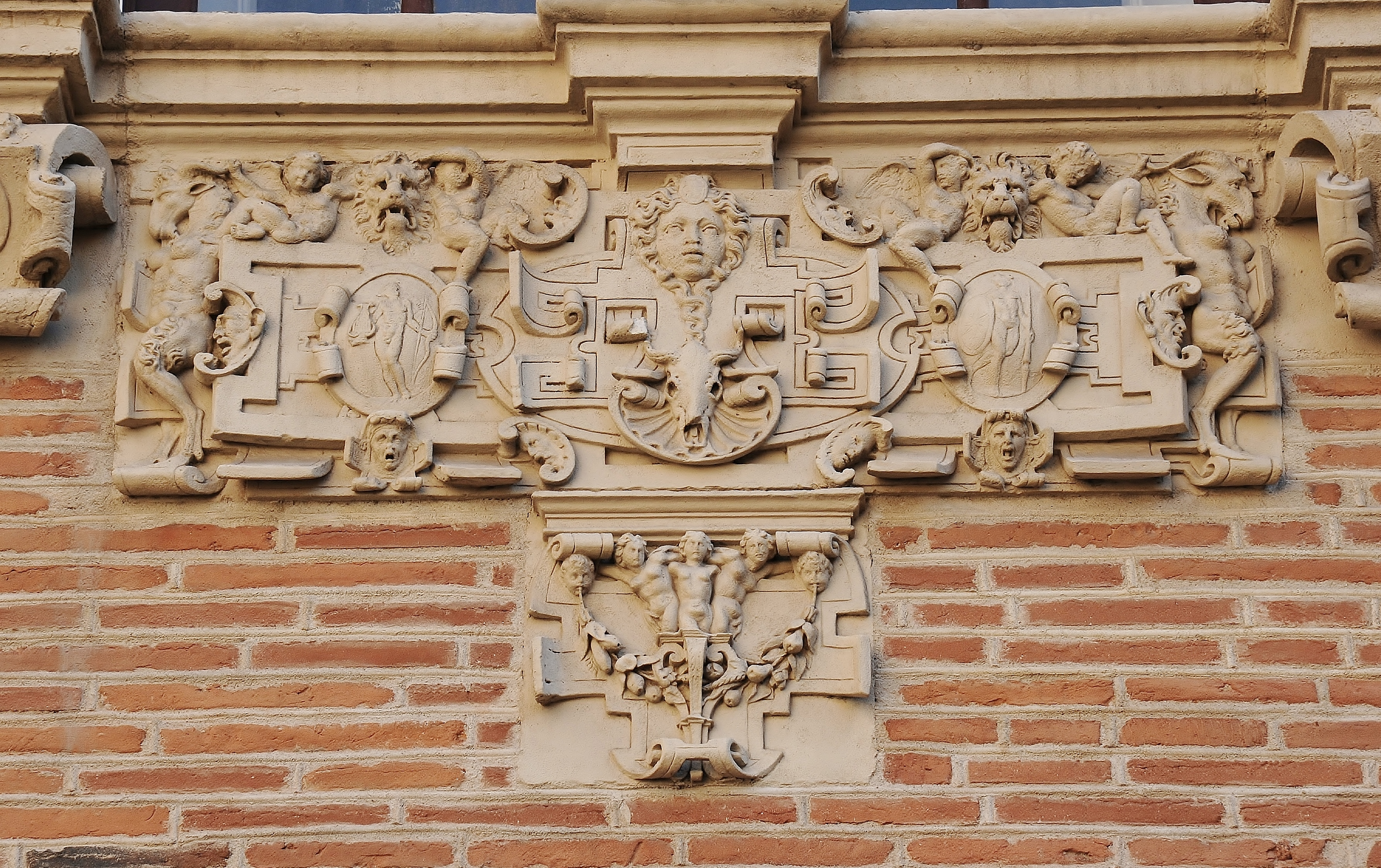

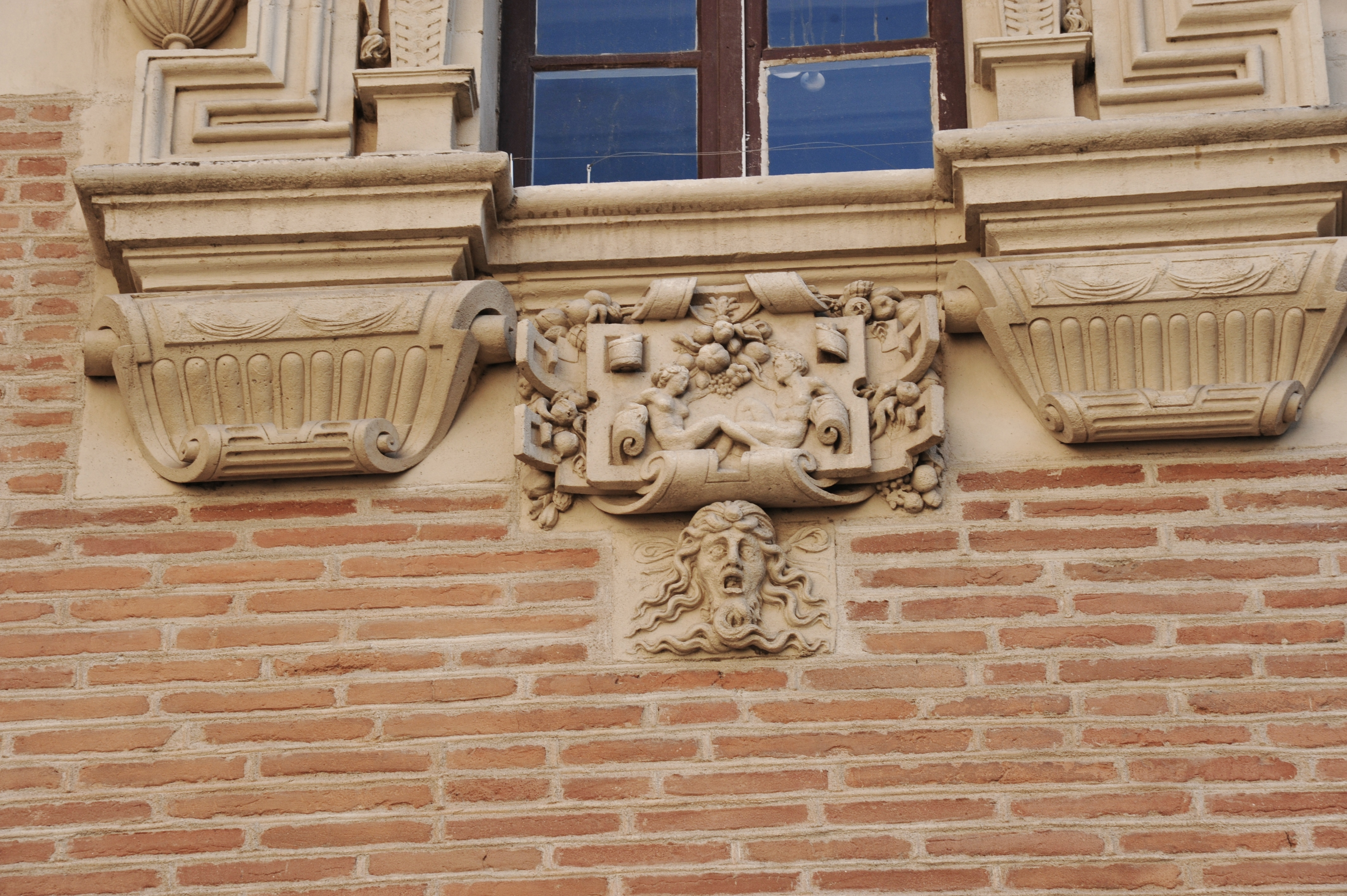

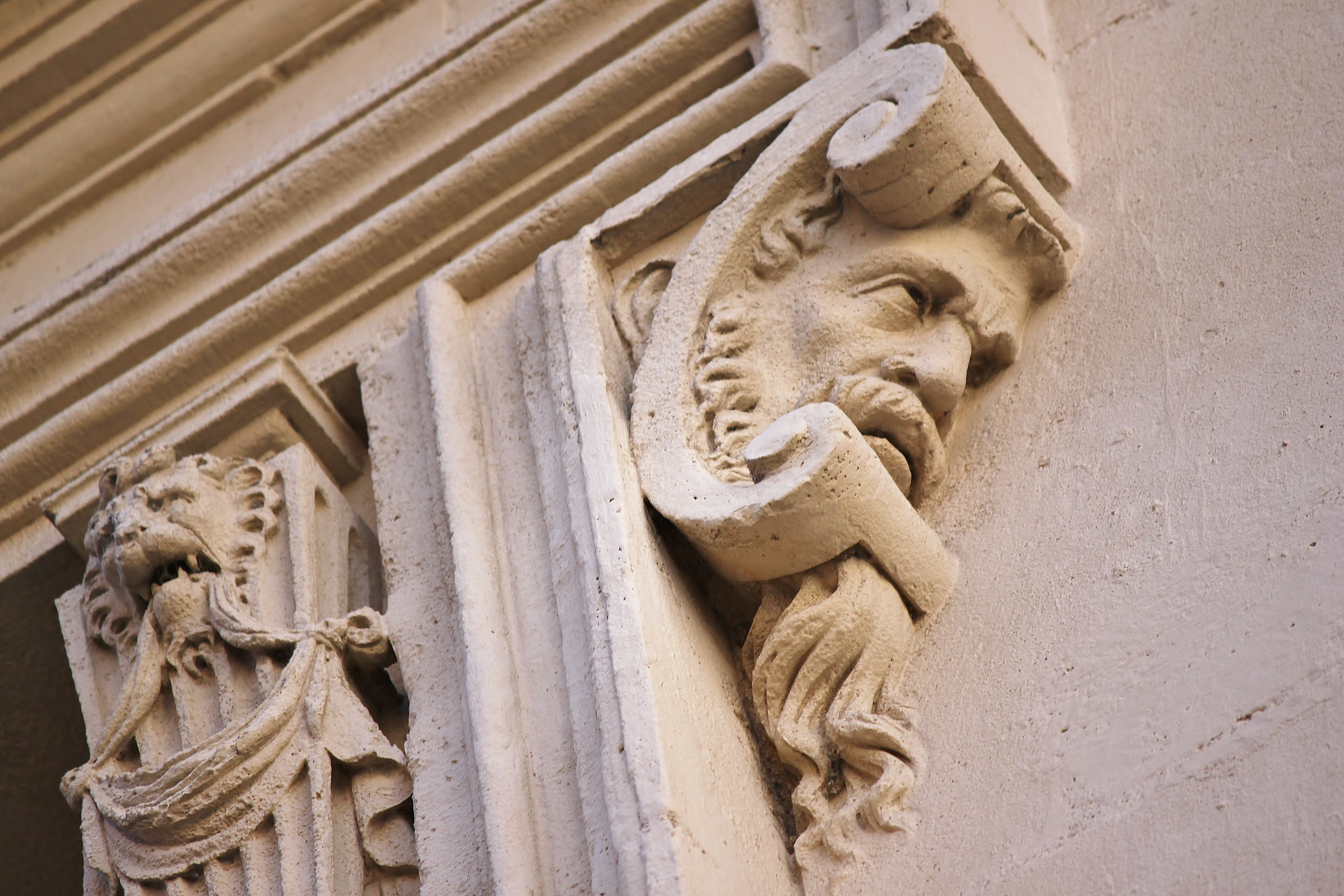

== See also ==
- Renaissance architecture of Toulouse

== Bibliography ==
- Guy Ahlsell de Toulza, Louis Peyrusse, Bruno Tollon, Hôtels et Demeures de Toulouse et du Midi Toulousain, Daniel Briand éditeur, Drémil Lafage, 1997
