= Hôtel Dahus =

Hotel in france

Coordinates: 43.5972°N 1.4465°E

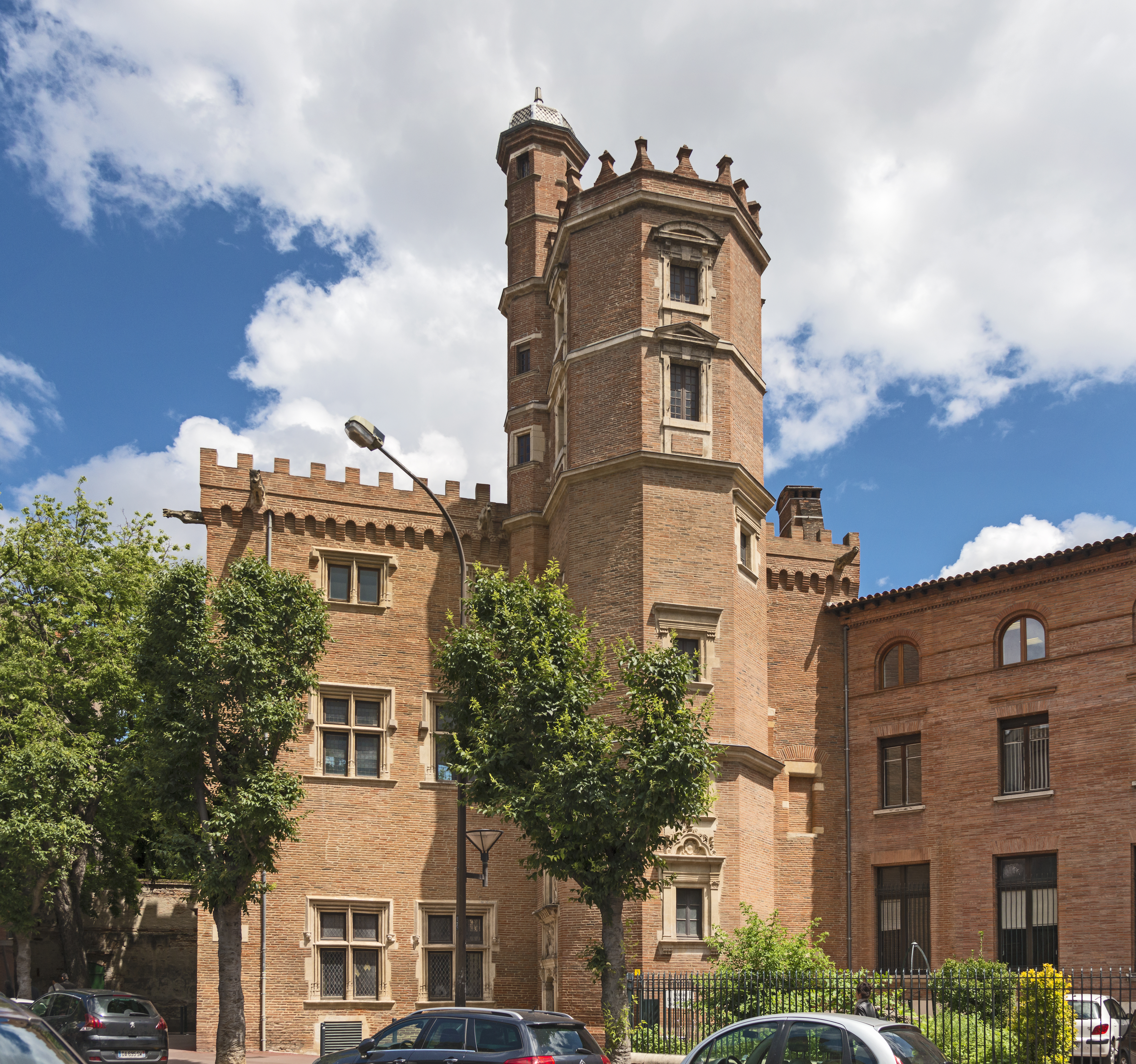
Facade of the rue Ozenne.

The Hôtel Dahus (also known as Hôtel de Tournoer) in Toulouse, France, is a Renaissance hôtel particulier (palace) of the 15th and 16th centuries. It is a listed historical monument since 1925.

== History ==
The Hotel Dahus, also called Capitoul Pierre-Dahus Hotel, Roquette Hotel or Tournoer Tower, is a private mansion in Toulouse, located at 9 rue Ozenne. It was built between 1474 and 1483, for the capitoul Pierre Dahus. The Tournoer Tower, dating from 1532, owes its name to the President of Parliament, Paul Tournoer, who had it erected. On the tower, a motto in Latin is engraved in the stone: ESTO MICHI DOMINE TURRIS FORTITUDINIS A FACIE INIMICI, "Lord, be for me a tower of courage against the enemy".

== Pictures ==
Hôtel Dahus

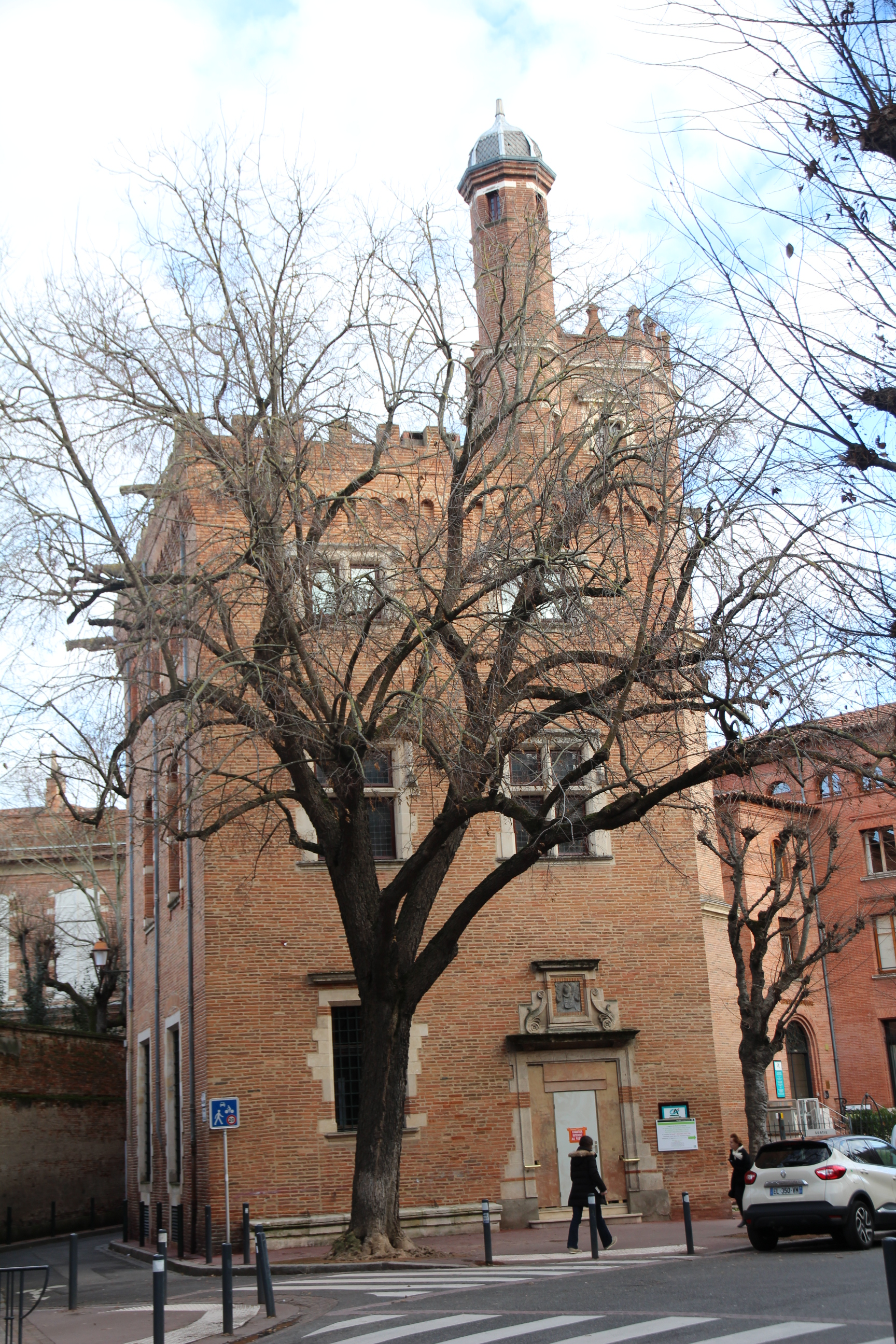

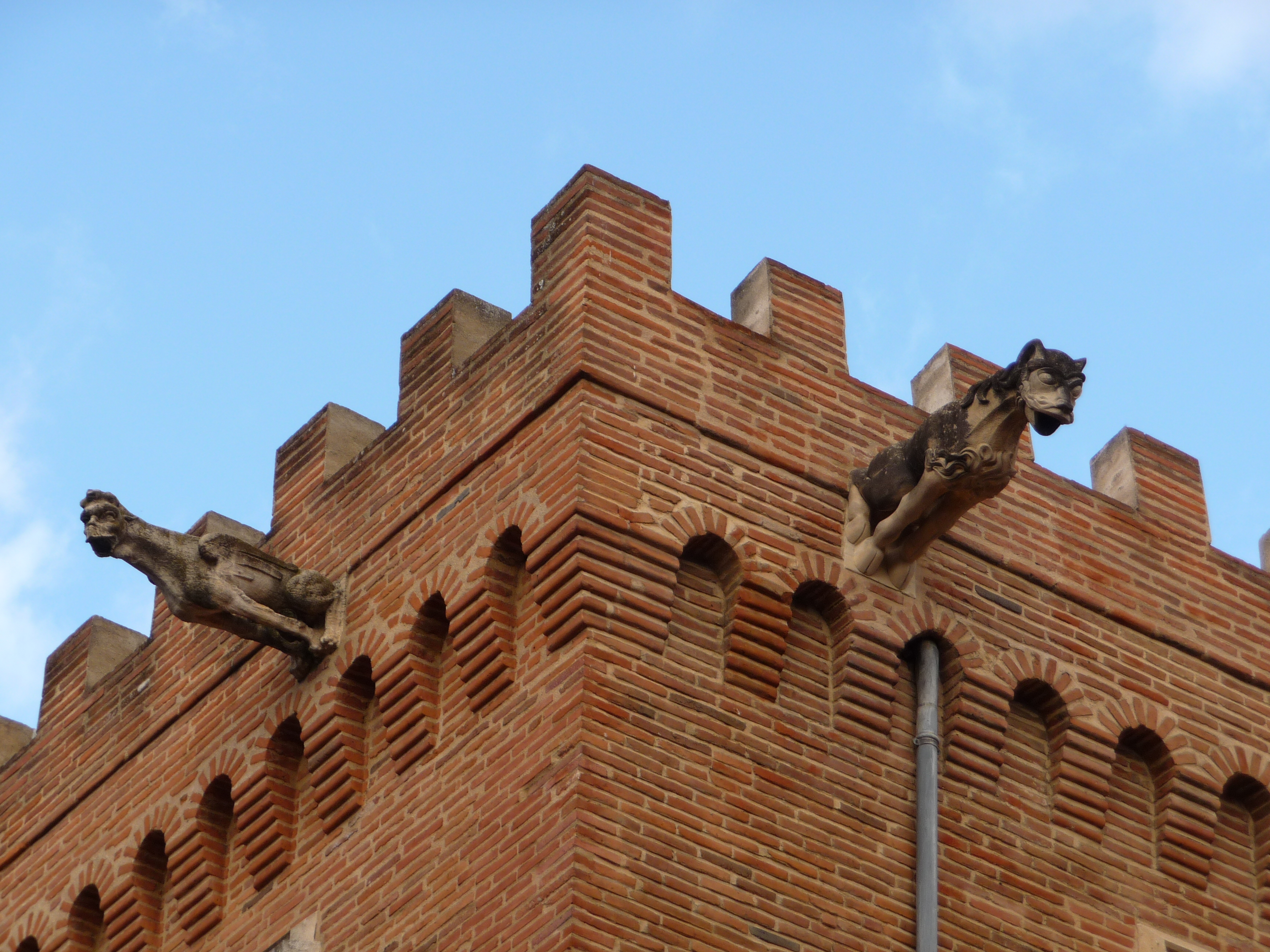

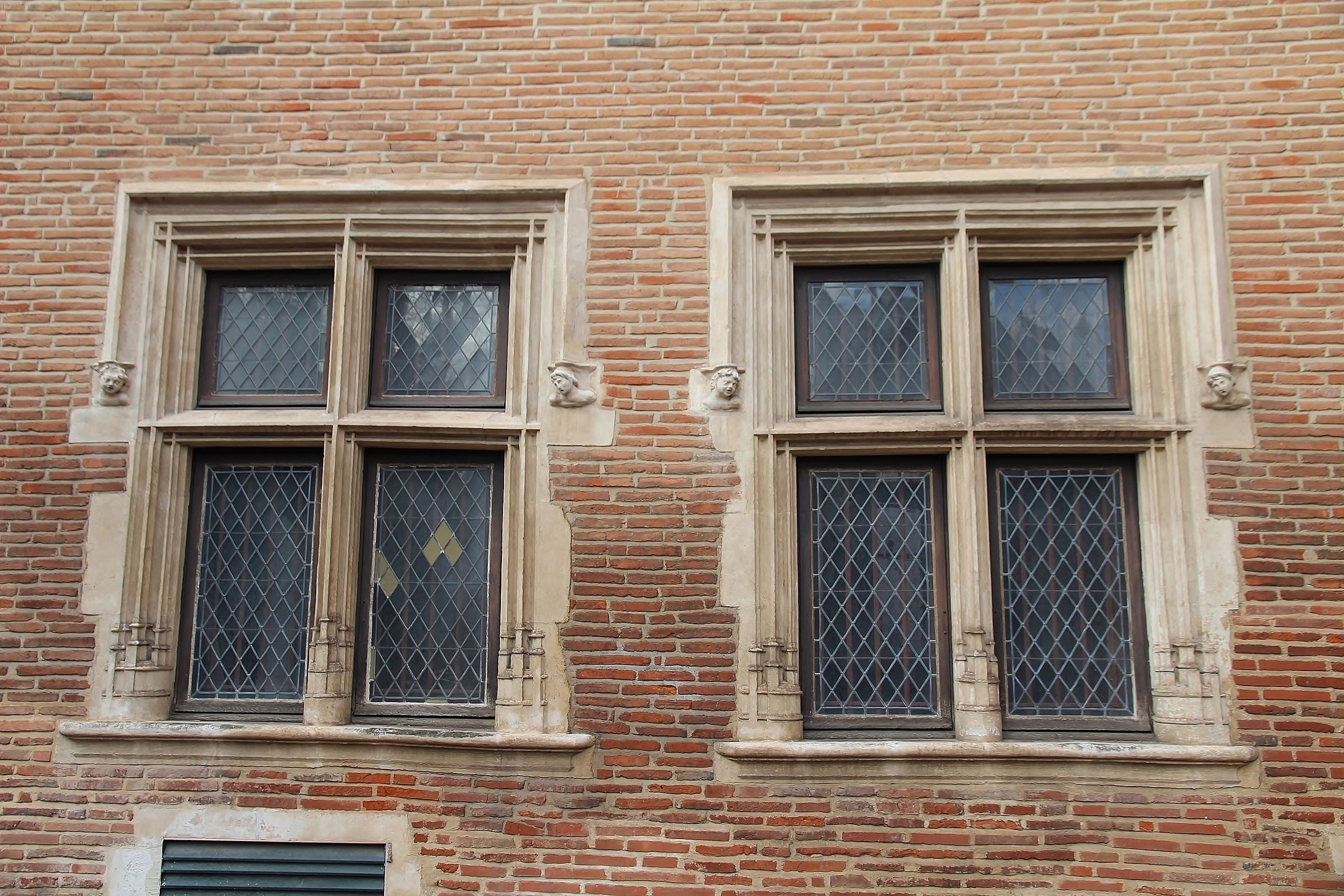

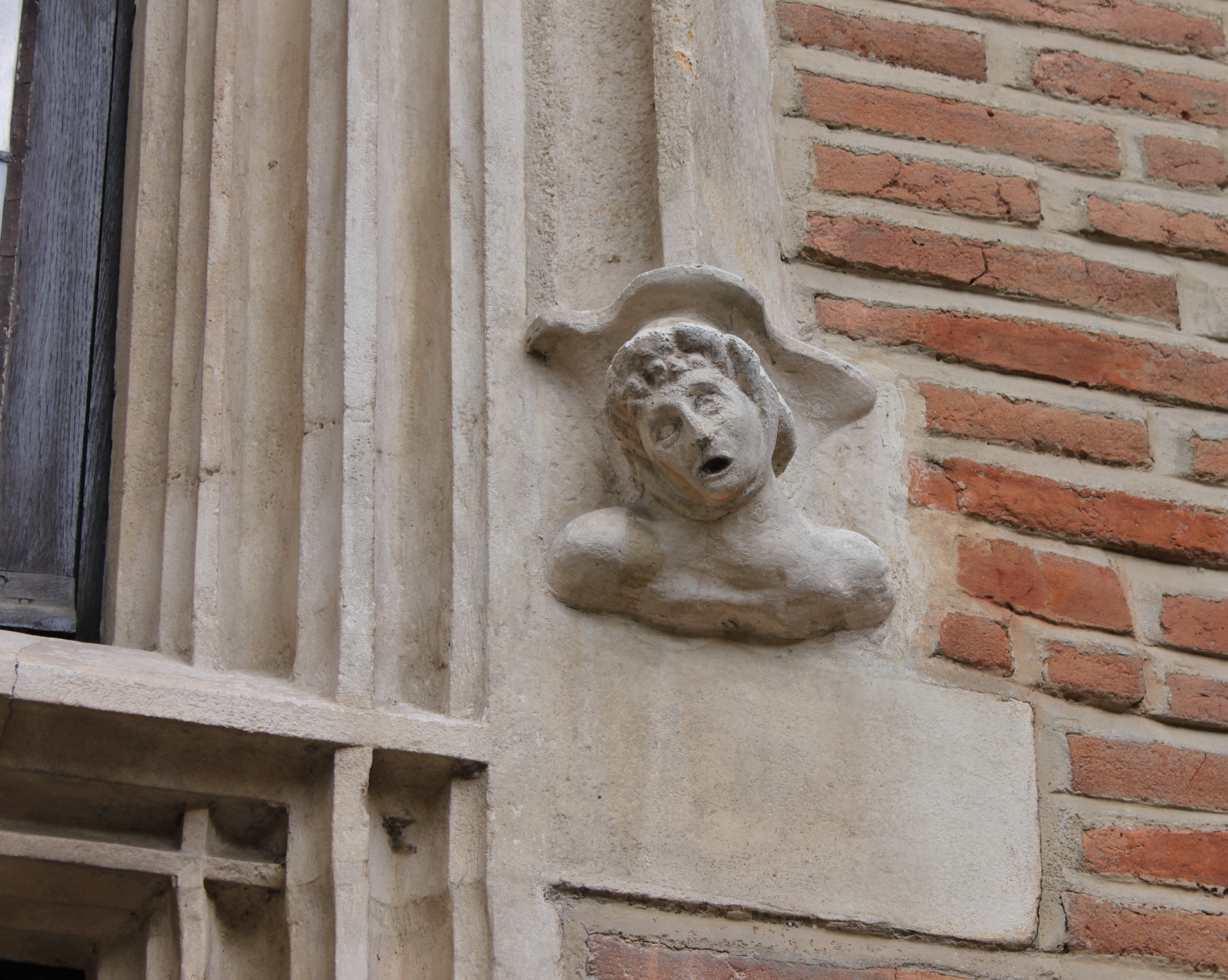

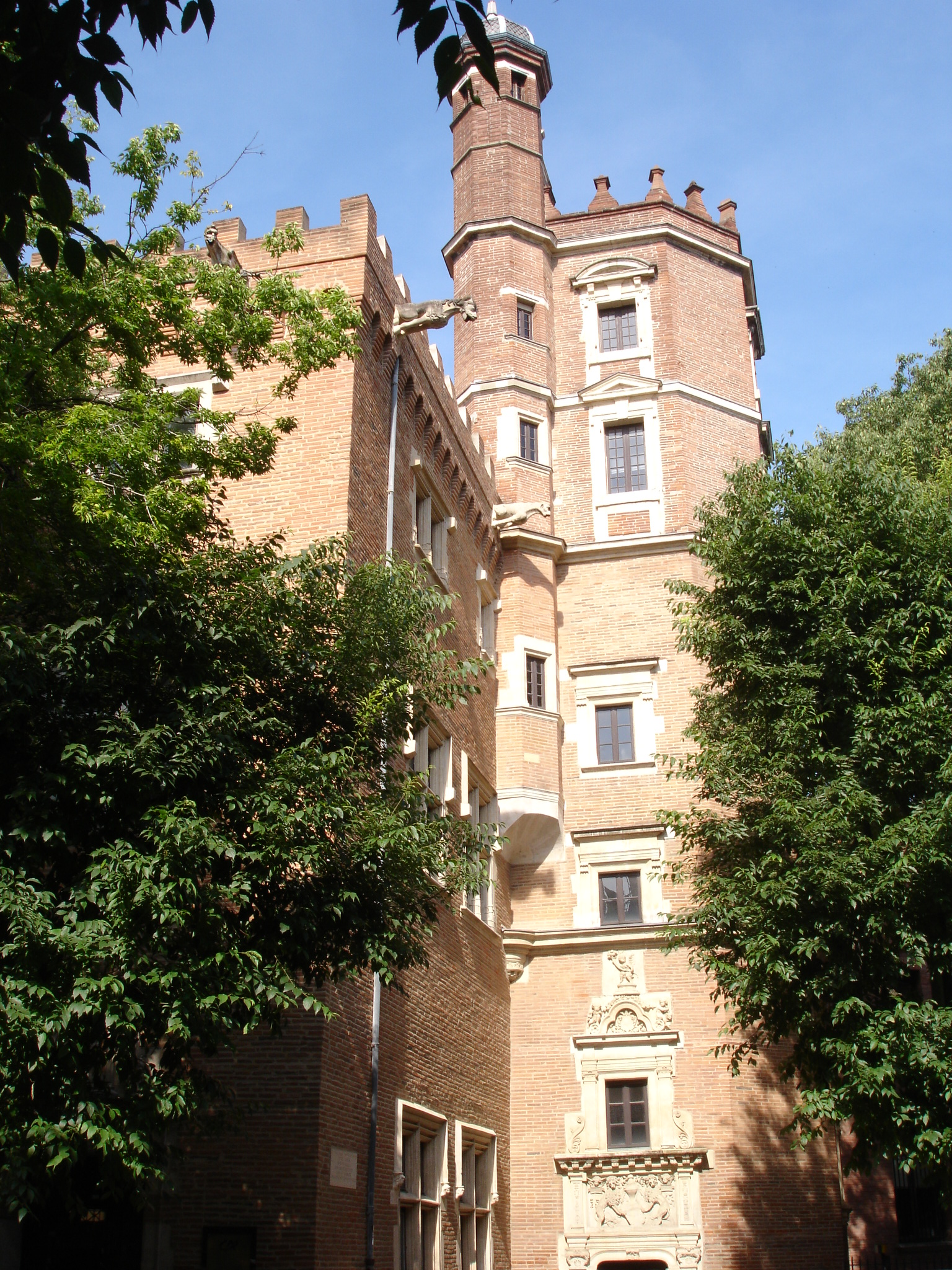

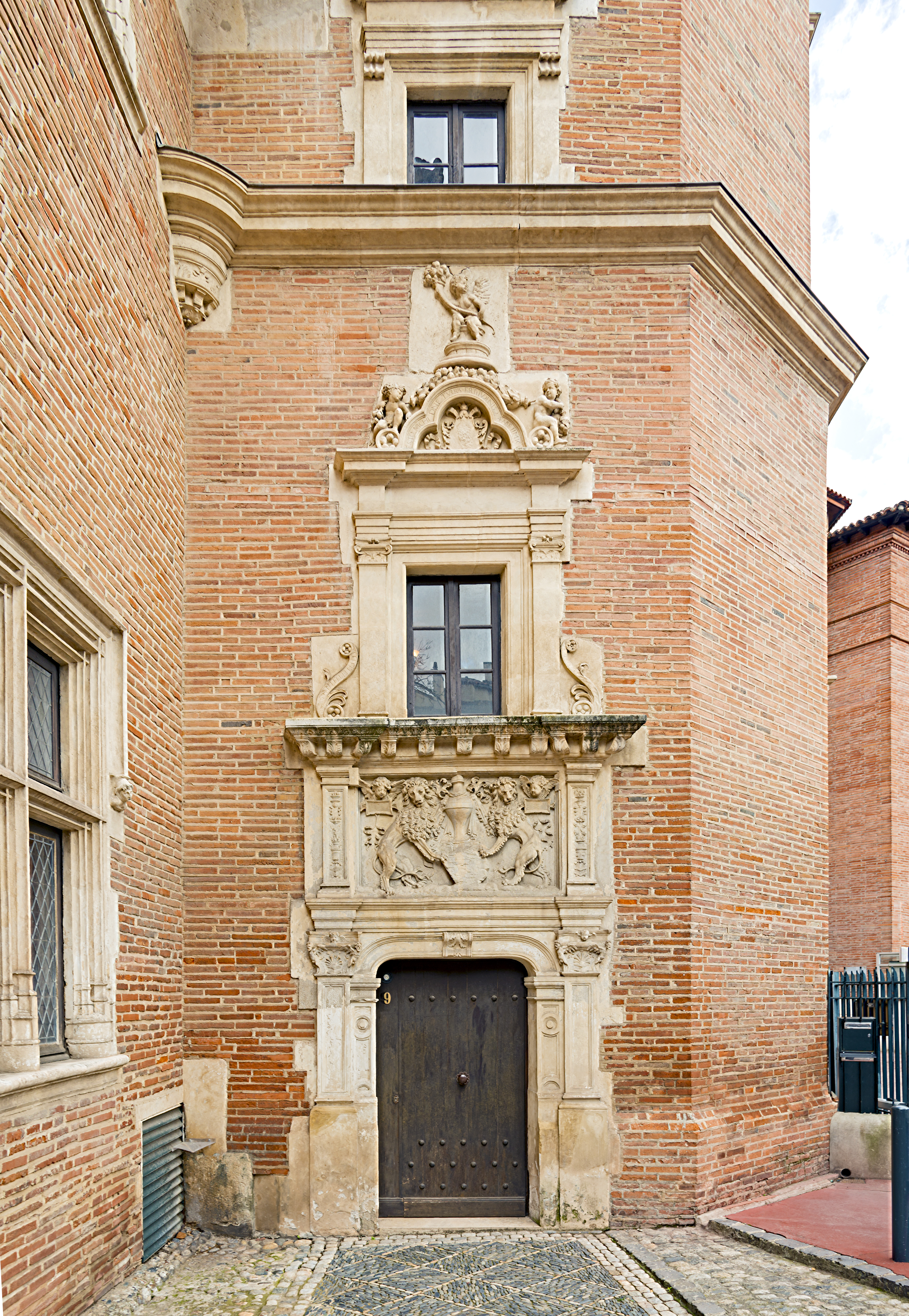

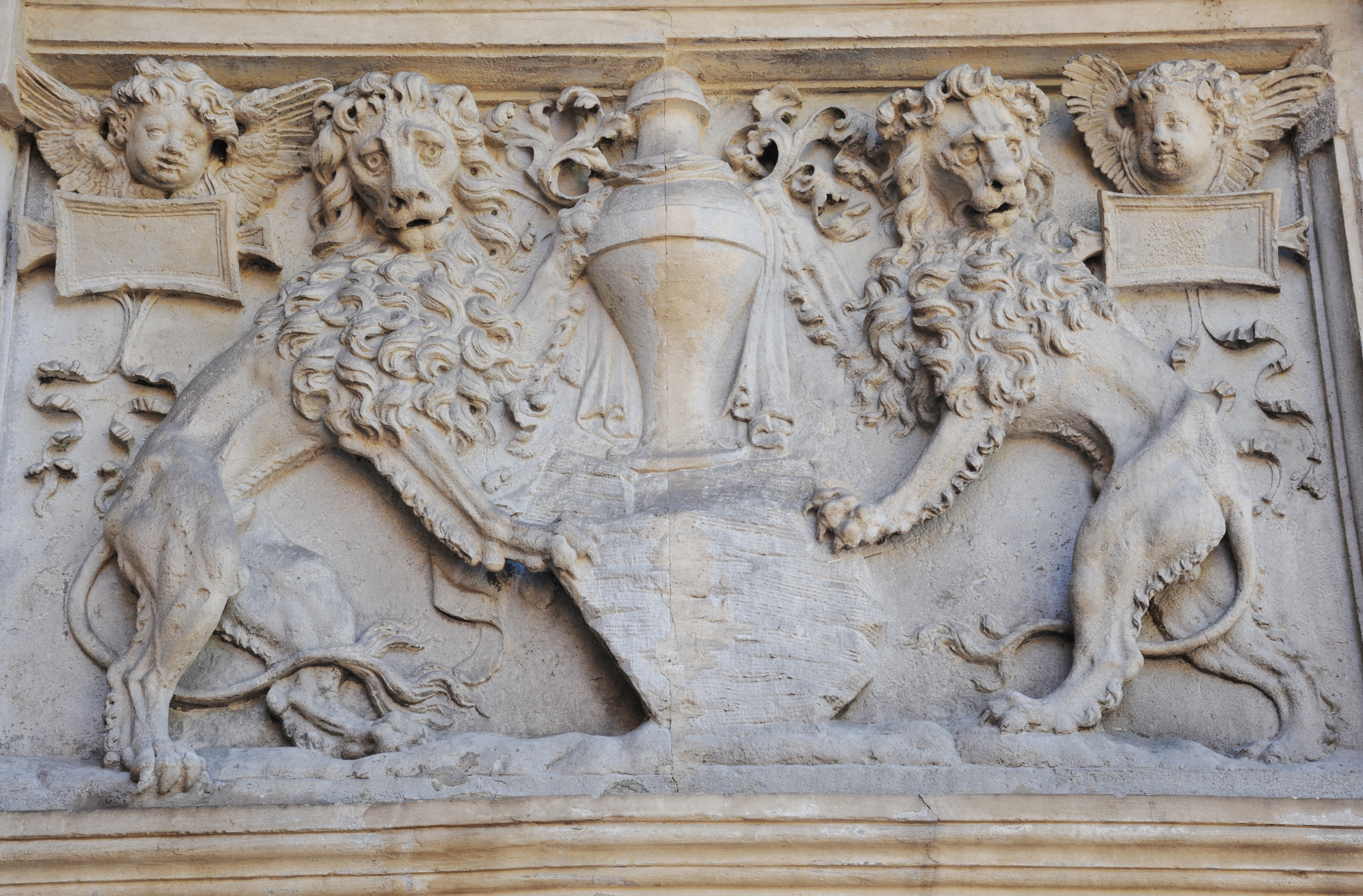

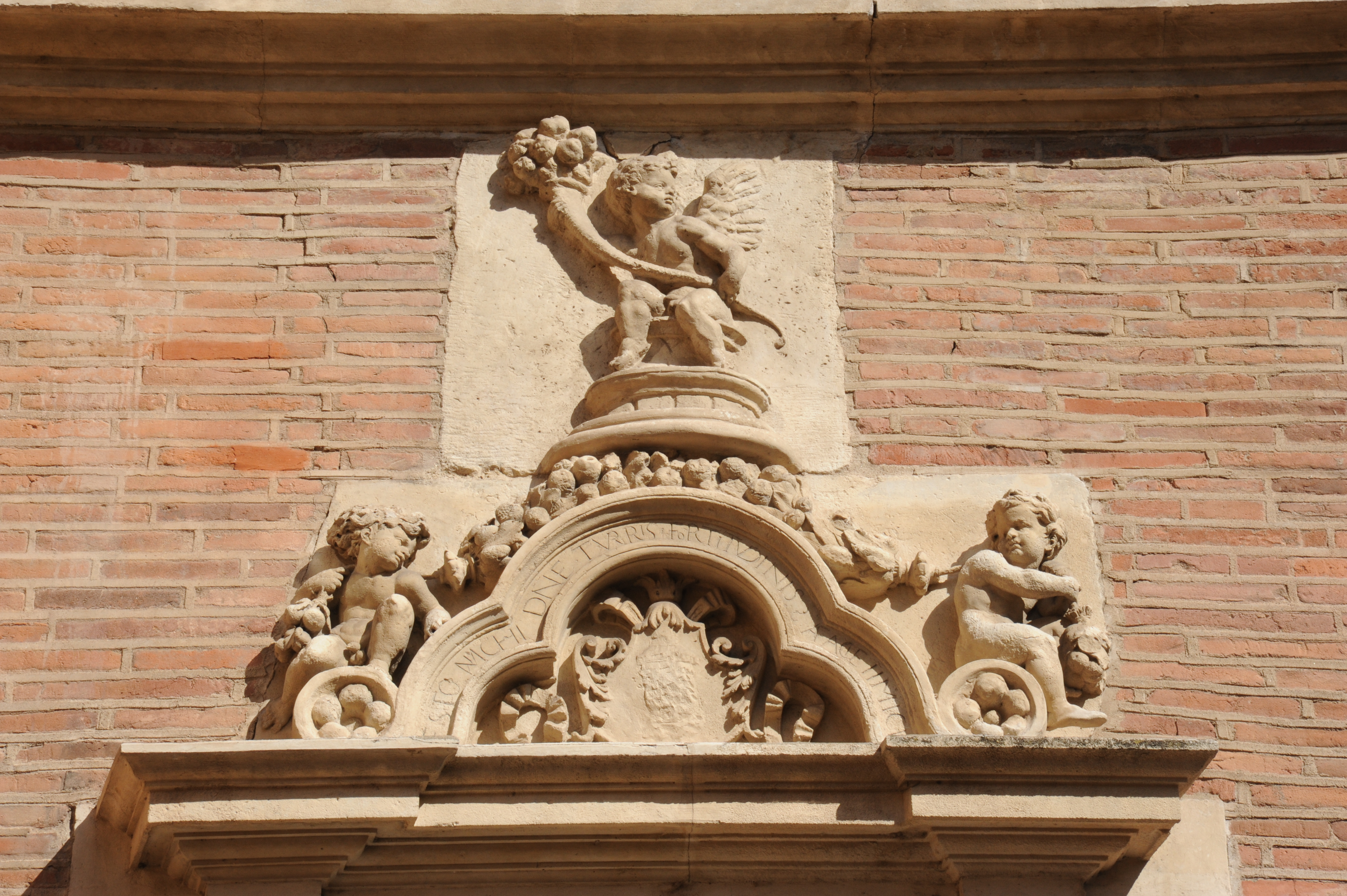

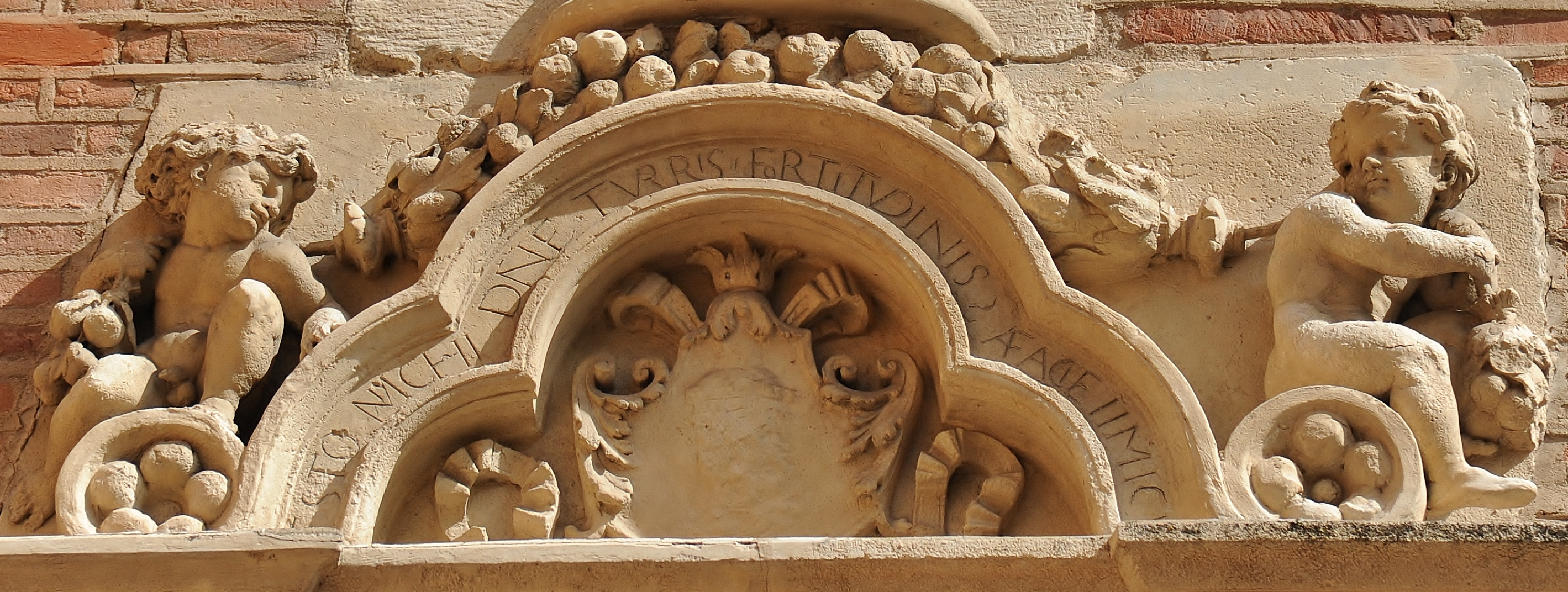

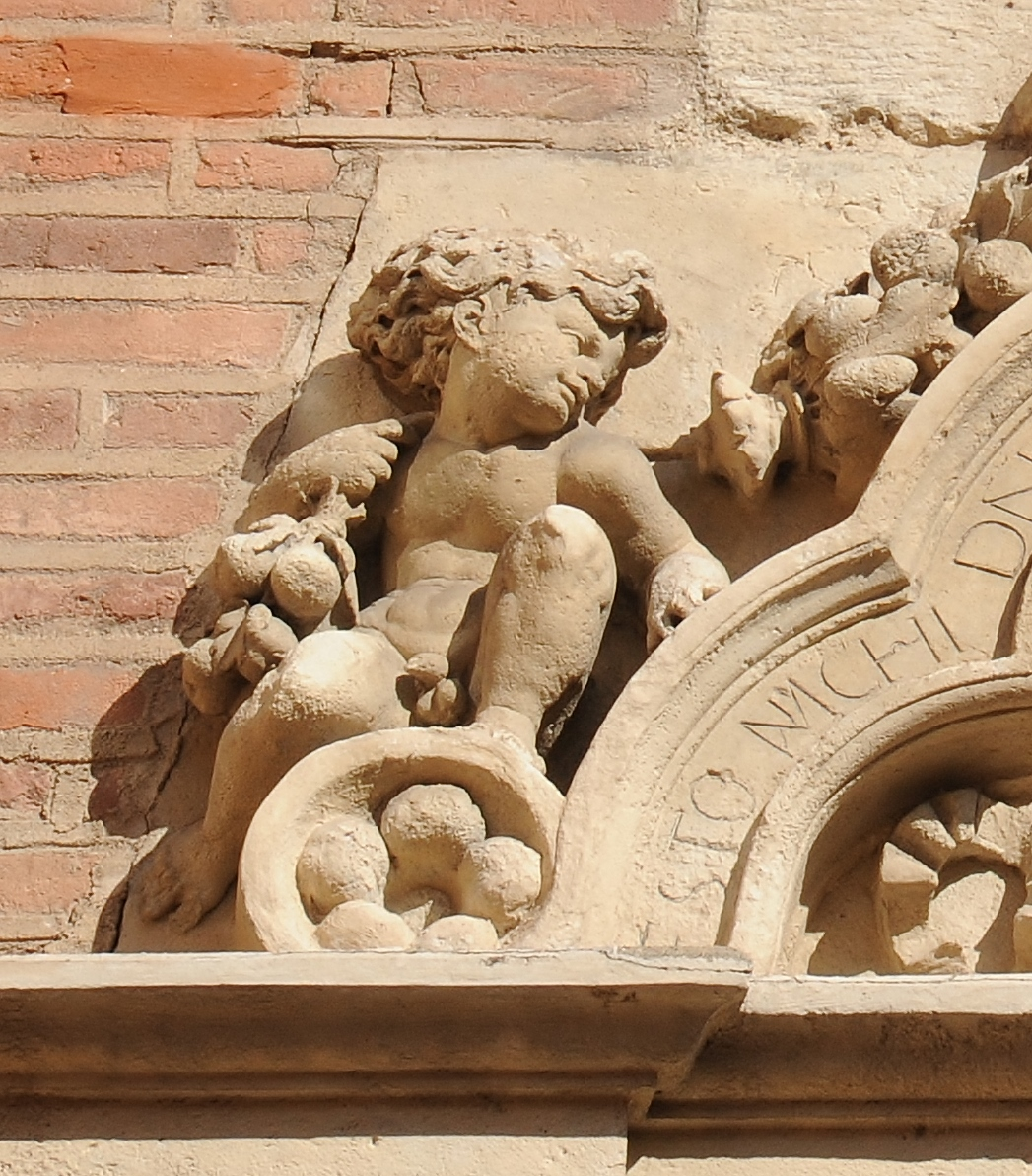

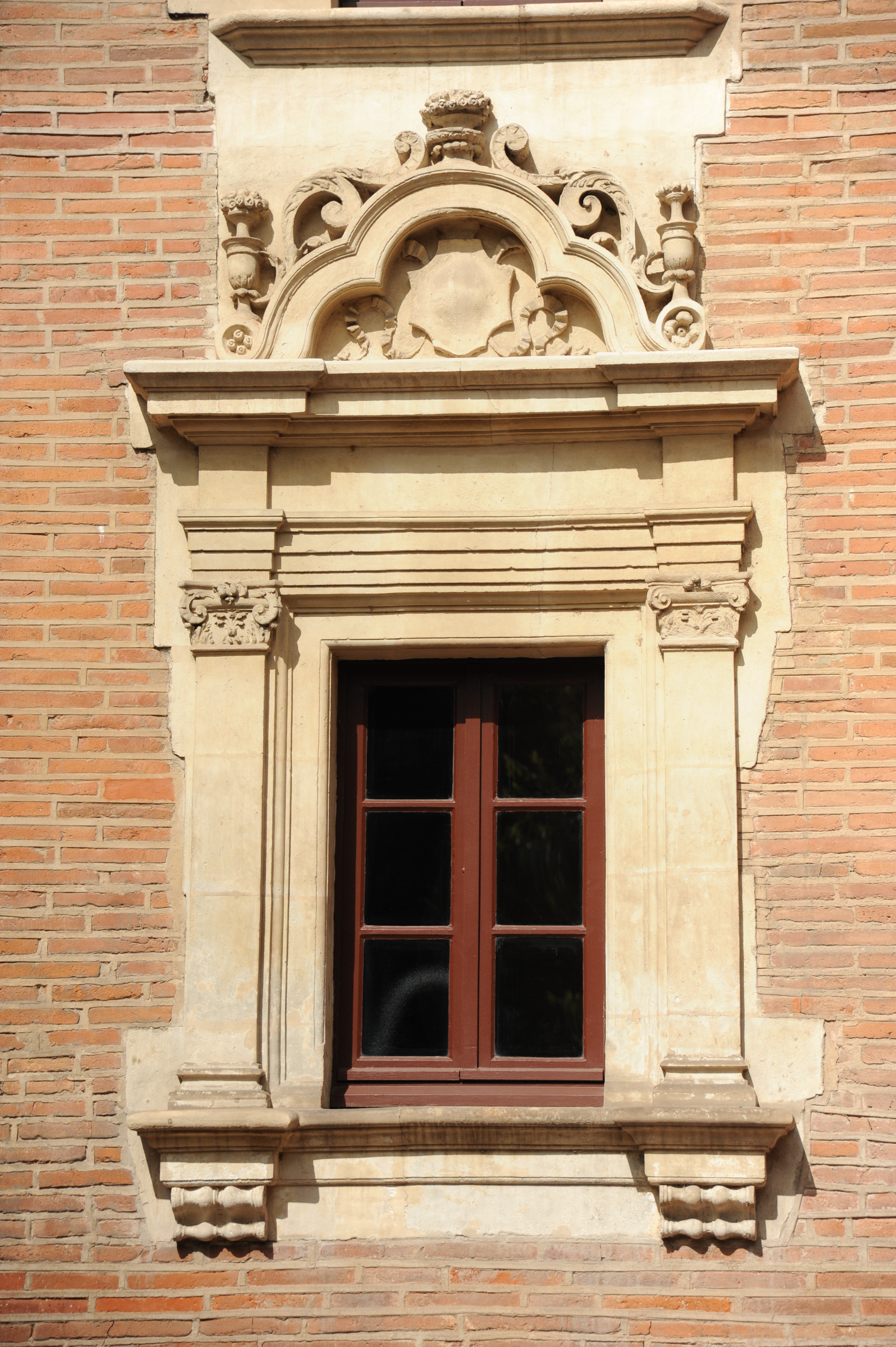

== See also ==
- Renaissance architecture of Toulouse

== Bibliography ==
- Guy Ahlsell de Toulza, Louis Peyrusse, Bruno Tollon, Hôtels et Demeures de Toulouse et du Midi Toulousain, Daniel Briand éditeur, Drémil Lafage, 1997
