= Hôtel de Felzins =

Coordinates: 43.5966°N 1.4426°E

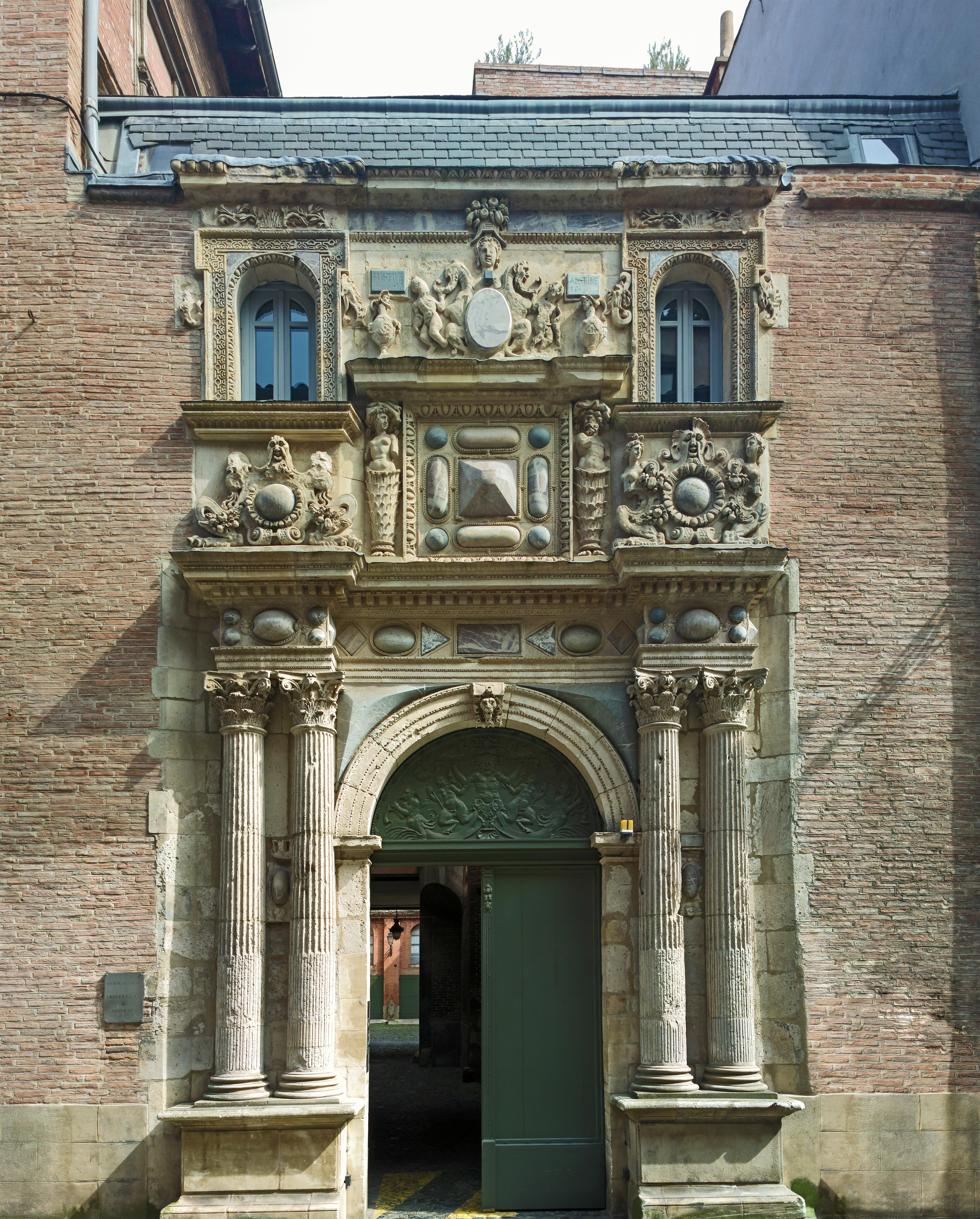
The Hôtel de Felzins.

The Hôtel de Felzins (Occitan: Ostal de Felzins) in Toulouse, France, is a Renaissance hôtel particulier (palace) of the 16th century, also called Hôtel de Molinier (Ostal de Molinier).

This mansion located in the historical center of Toulouse was built in the middle of the 16th century (1550-1556) for parliamentarian Gaspard Molinier.

The hotel is representative of the Toulouse mansions, characteristic with its Renaissance motifs. It is particularly noteworthy for its Mannerist portal on the Rue de la Dalbade, with rich and exuberant decor.

A room on the ground floor has preserved its monumental fireplace of the sixteenth century, Henry II style. Engraved above the upper bas-relief, which represents the demi-god Hercules, are the mentions Hercules Gallicus and Charitas nunquam excidit. Two medallions represent Roman emperors.

== History ==
Works to build this house started in 1550 for Gaspard Molinier, a powerful man and long time member of the parliament. The entrance comprises a monumental gate surmounted with numerous sculptures, including monstruous beings and marble inlays. This ensemble corresponds to the then-new style known today as mannerism, whose principal traits are an abundance of sculpted figures, the depiction of a fantastic bestiary, and a marked taste for relief and polychromatic interplays.

The taste for marble inlays in architecture would endure until the start of the following century. The quarries of the Pyrenees were the source of this precious material which, from Toulouse, was sent to royal building projects, such as the Louvre. The sculptor, as yet unidentified, drew inspiration from the engravings of Marcantonio Raimondi and the works of the royal architect Sebastiano Serlio.

The turret of the second courtyard gave rise to some erudite ornamentation: magnificently sculpted putti play with a floral garland, symbolizing abundance and fertility. Immediately above them, the small consoles featuring pods or cloves resemble those of Hôtel d'Assézat.

Hôtel Molinier also contains the most beautiful fireplace of Renaissance Toulouse, it being built between 1551 and 1556. The sculptor took for model a fireplace of Château de Madrid (a royal castle near Paris) designed by Girolamo della Robbia for king Francis I. The hood bears a scene that evoke Christian charity, through the inscription, and a Gaulish Hercules on the sculpted bas-relief. Hercules enchains the populace, without restraining them, by means of a bond that links his mouth to the ears of Man. It is, therefore, a celebration of eloquence and good government, a symbol French royalty would appropriate in the sixteenth century. Combining the virtues of Christianity, politics and intellect, the sculpture of the fireplace commissioned by Gaspard Molinier reflected the aspirations of the erstwhile consellor to the king.

== Pictures ==
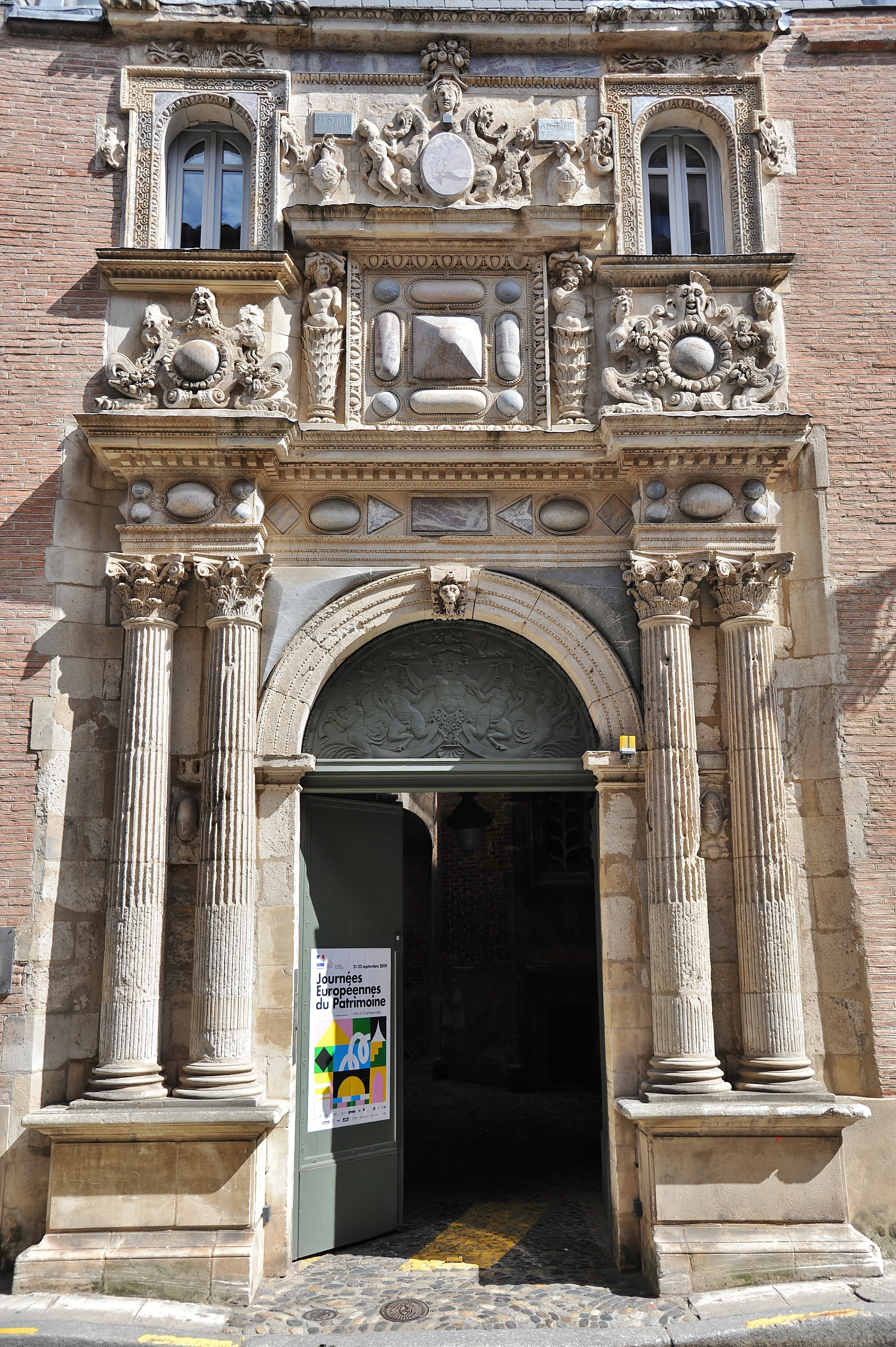

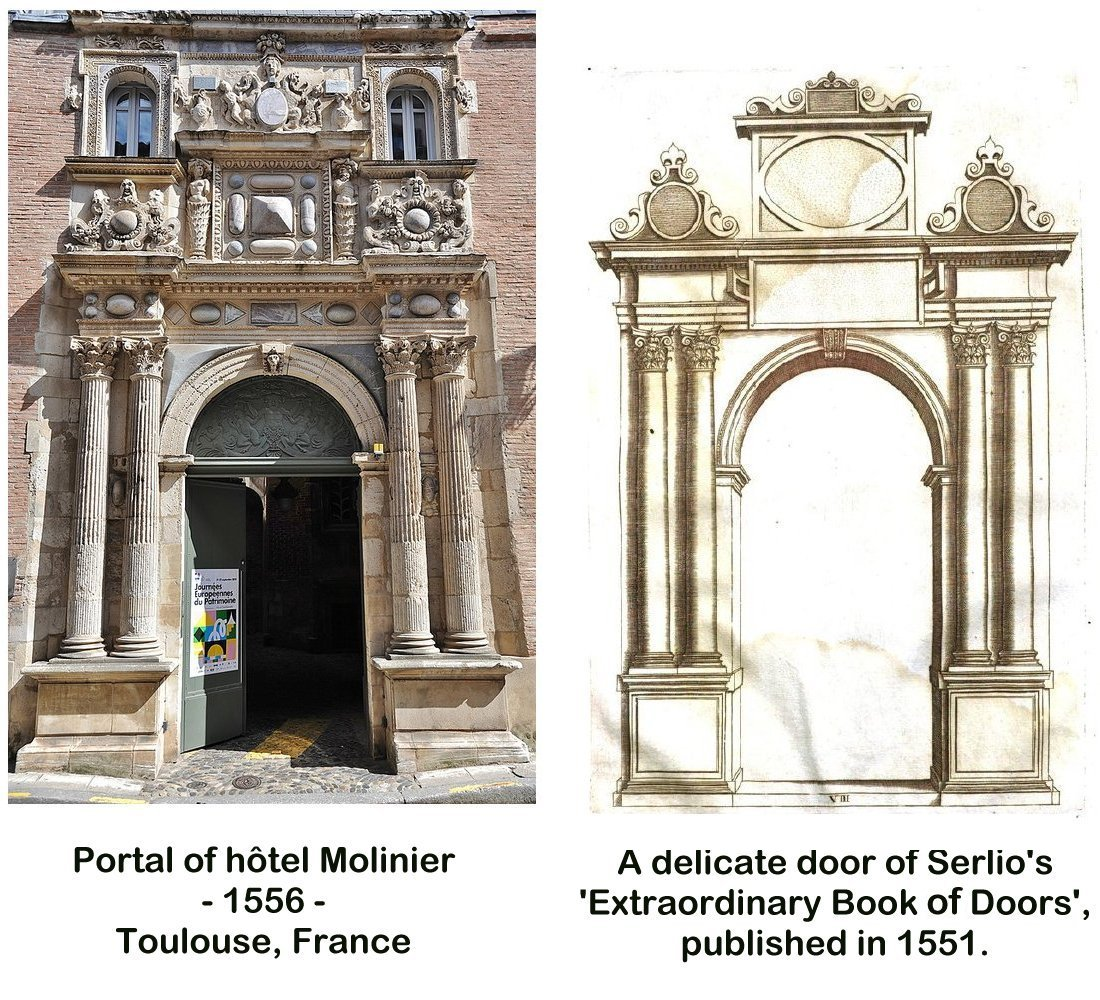

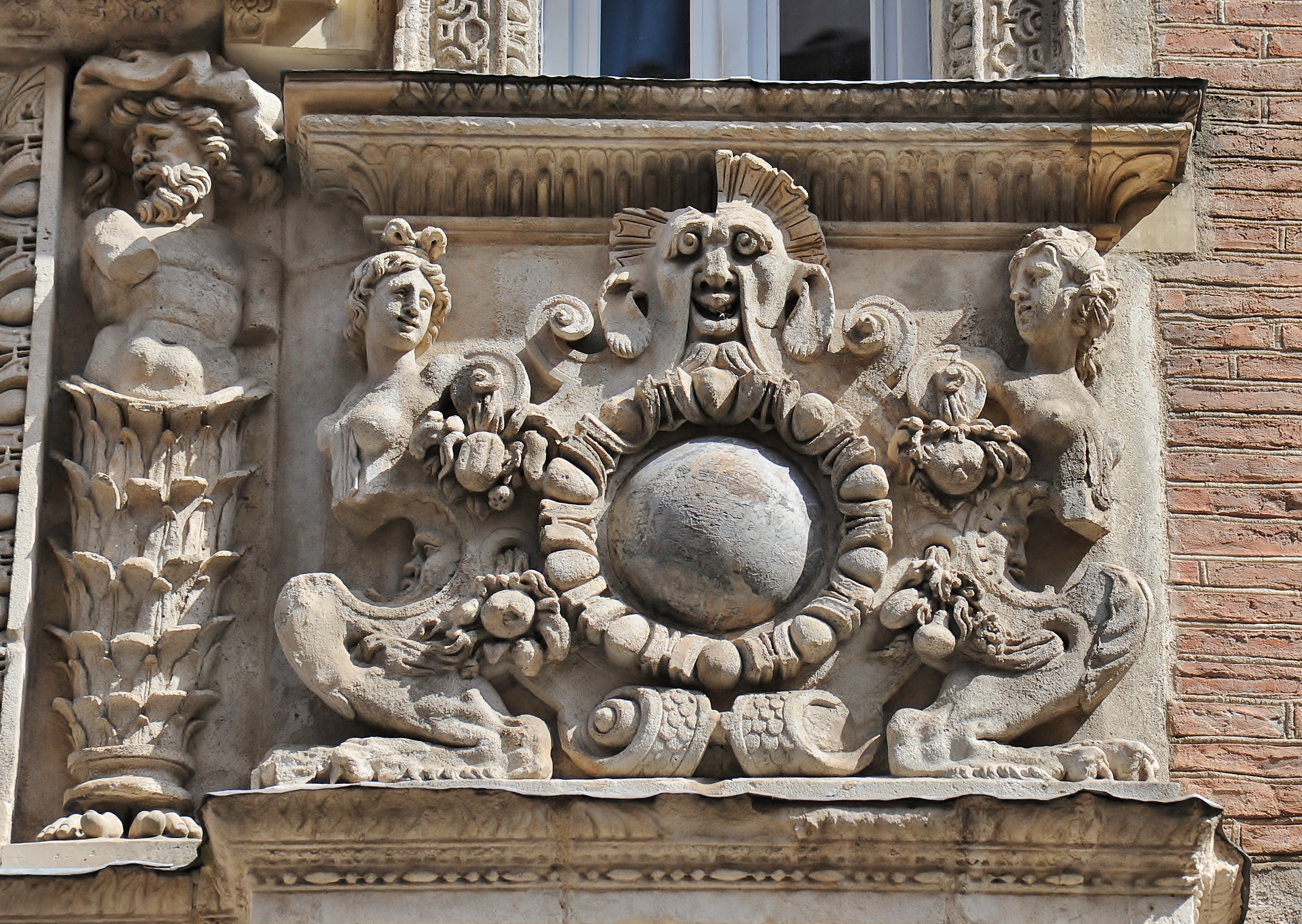

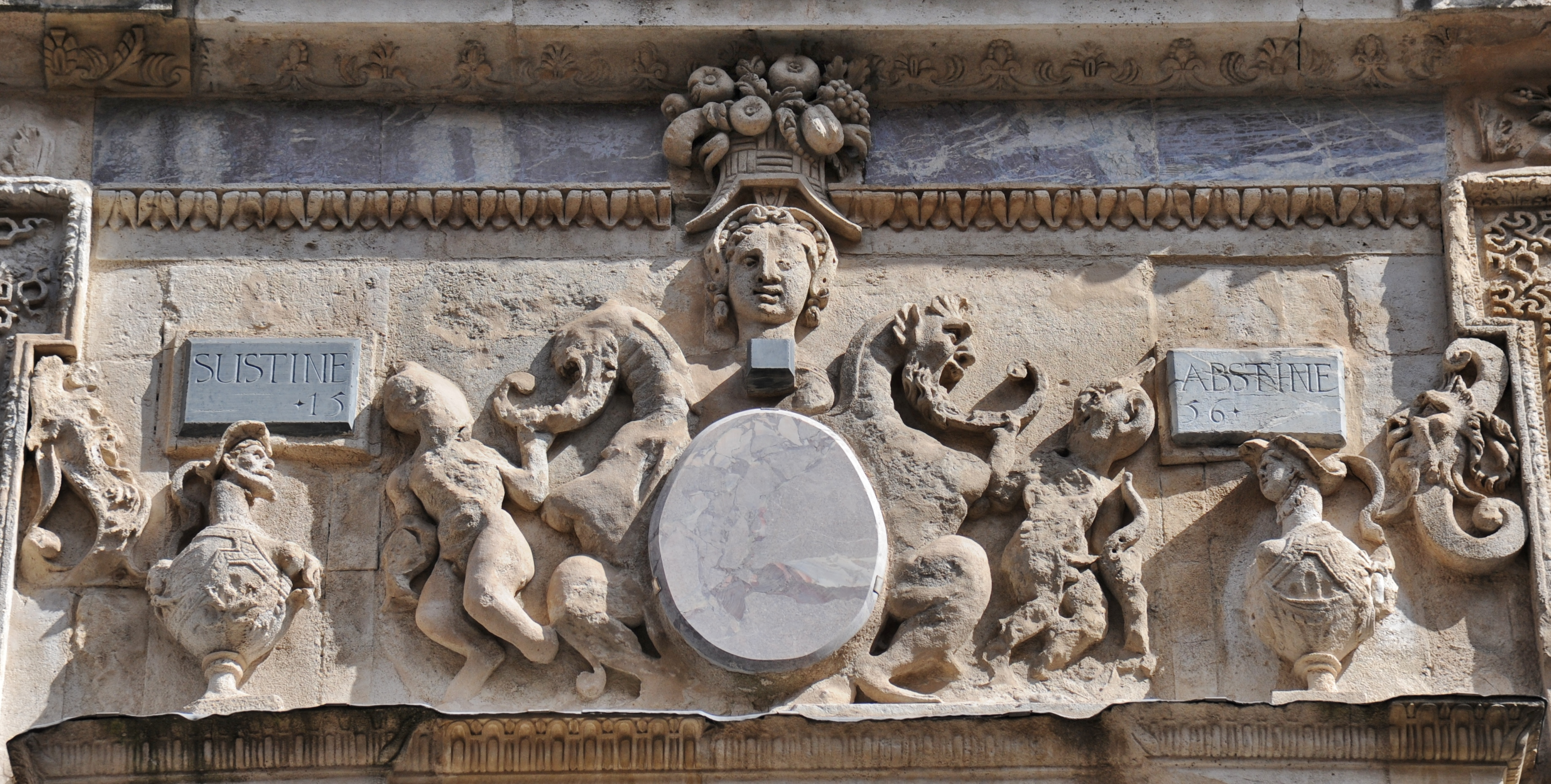

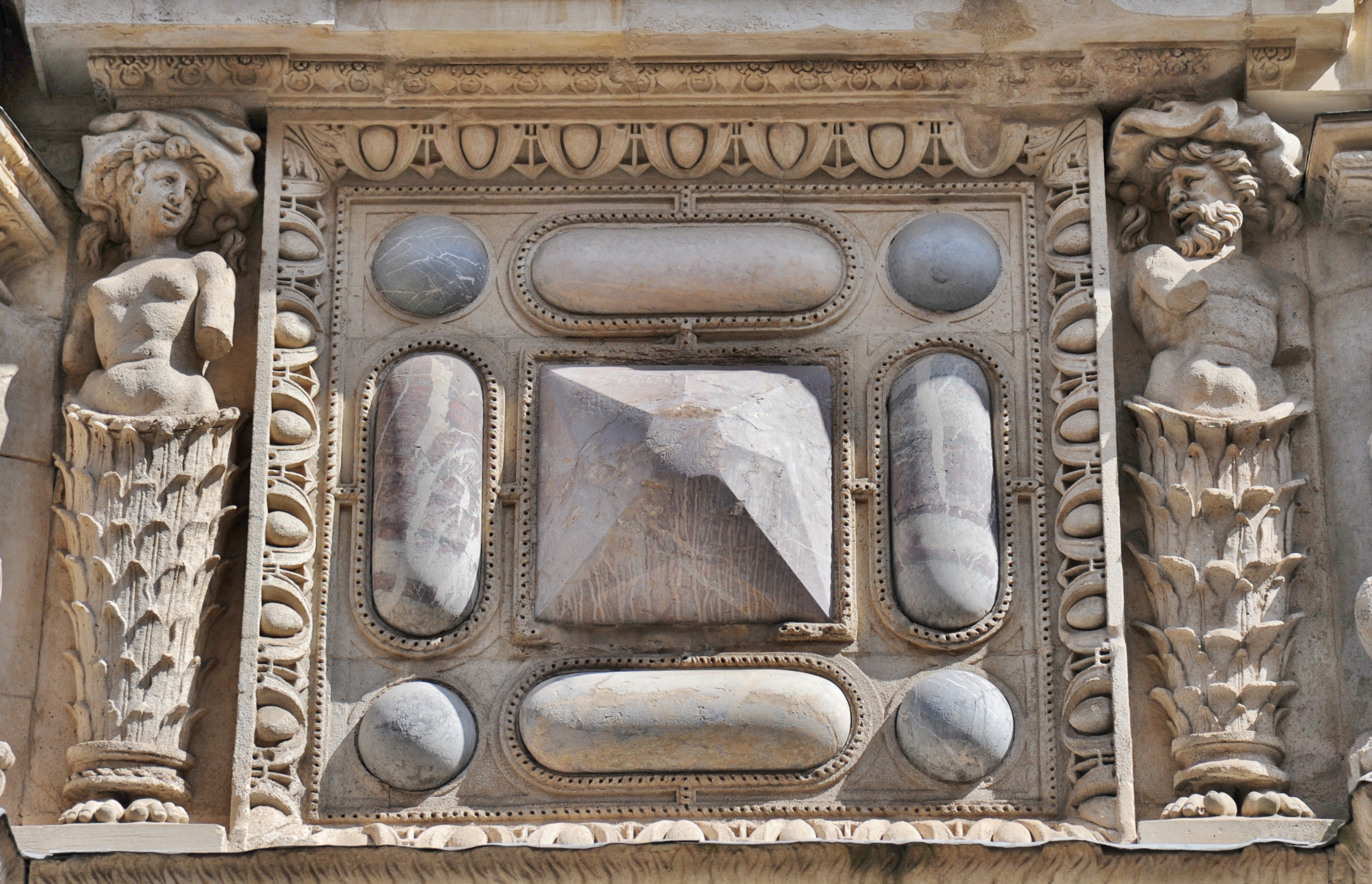

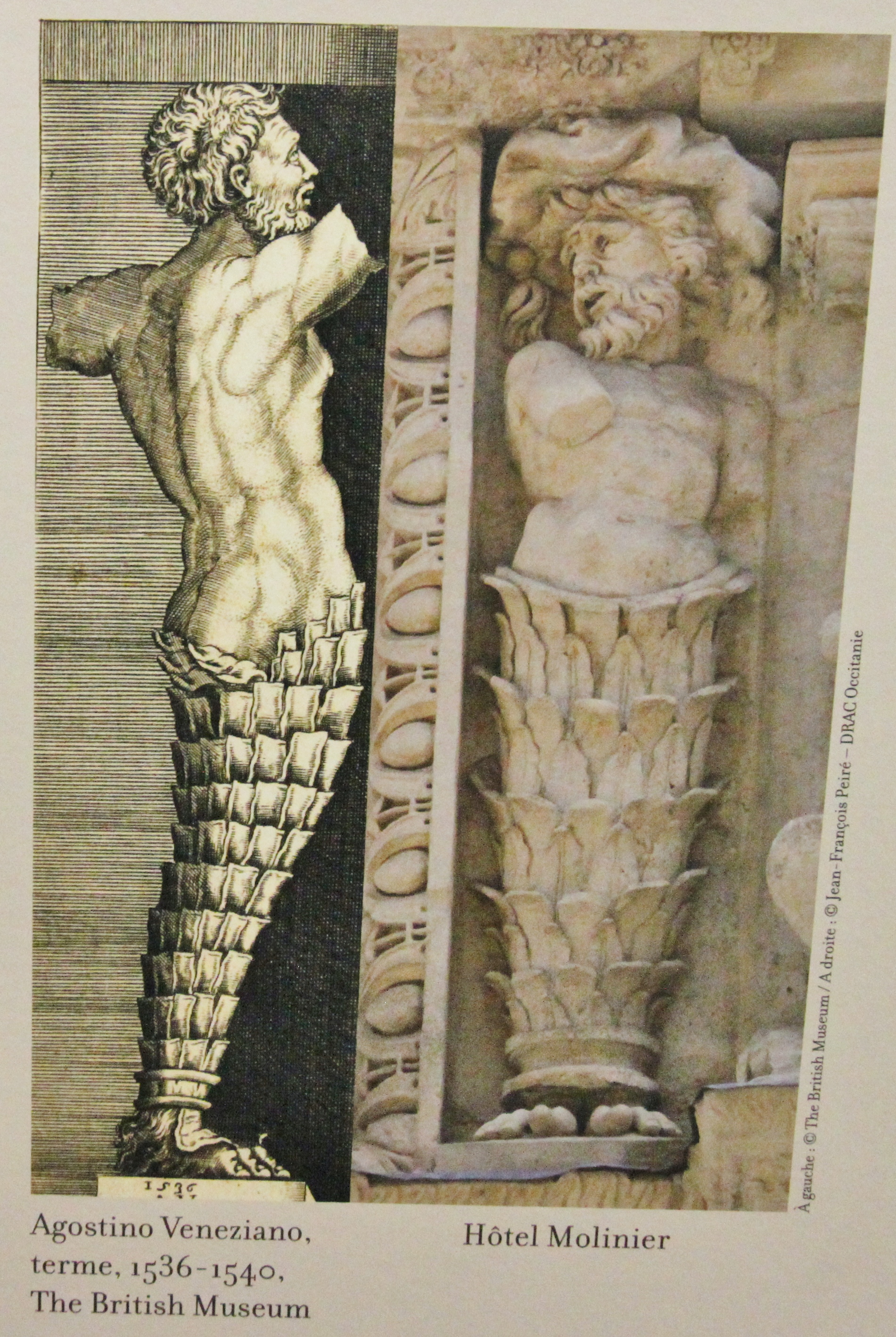

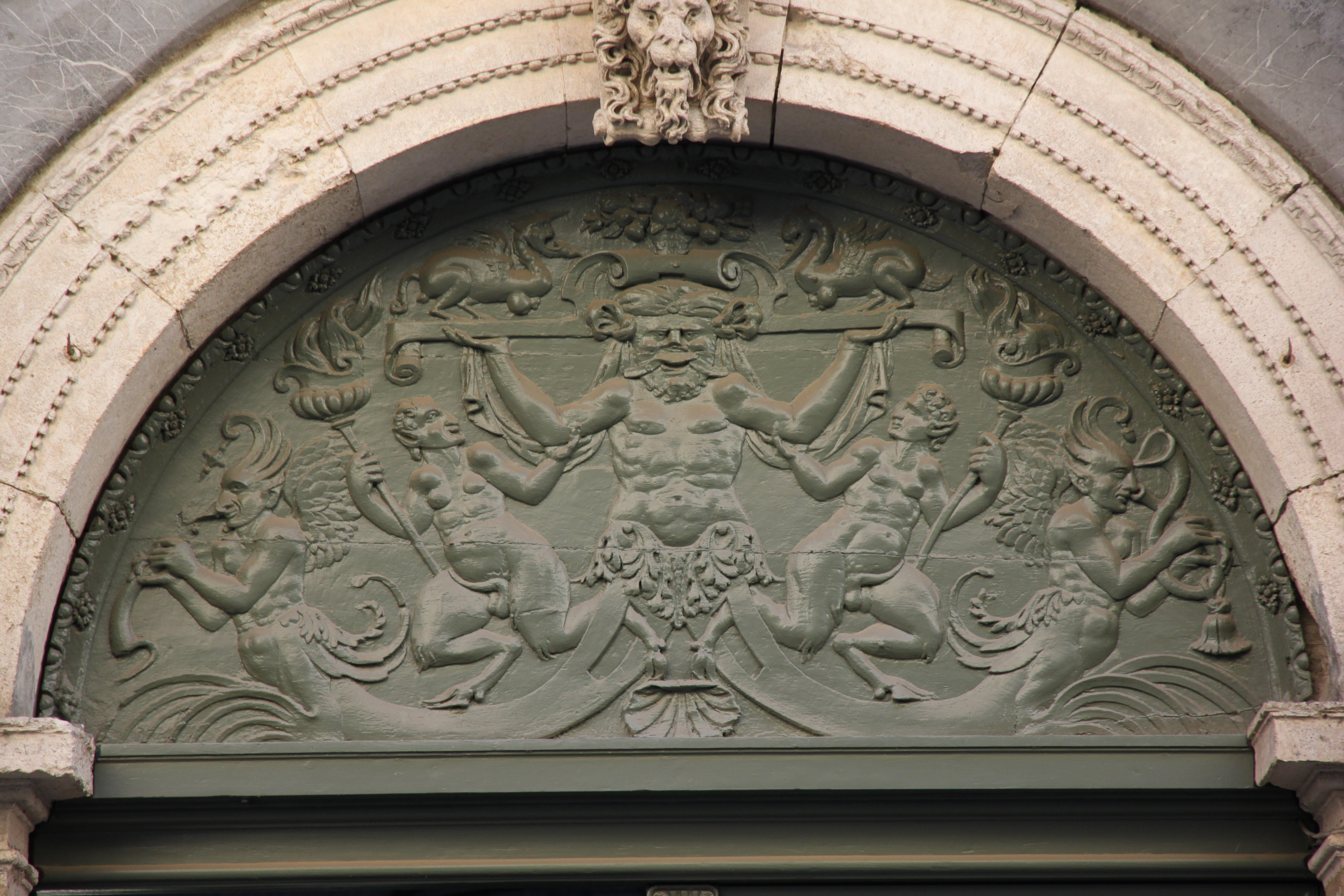

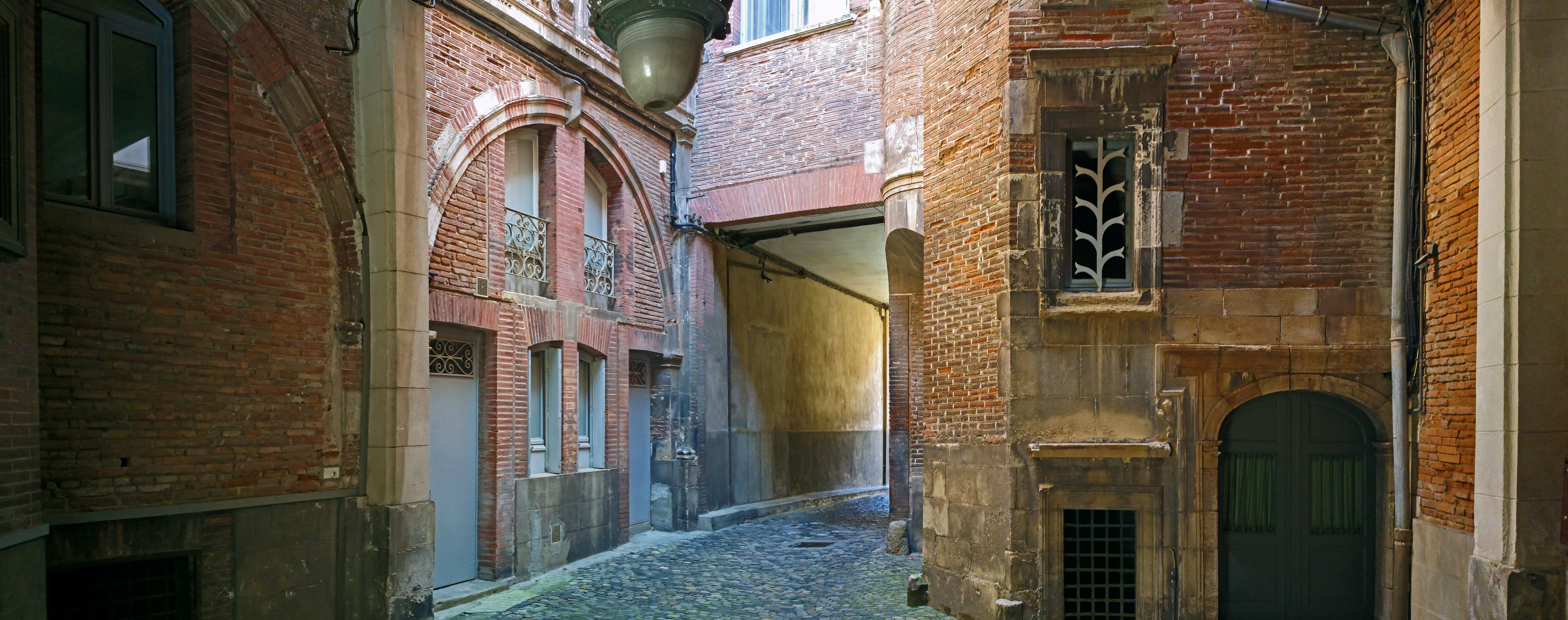

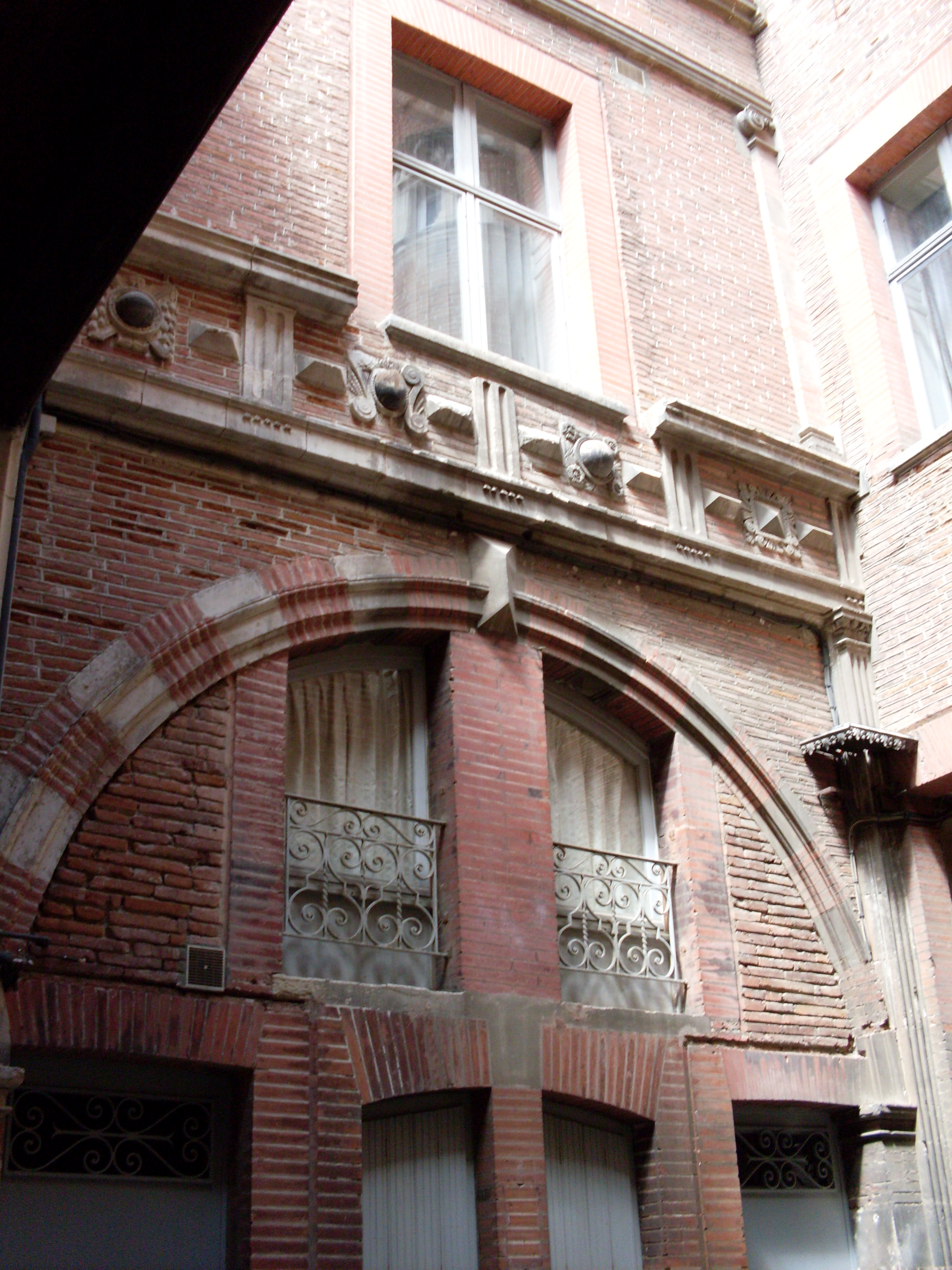

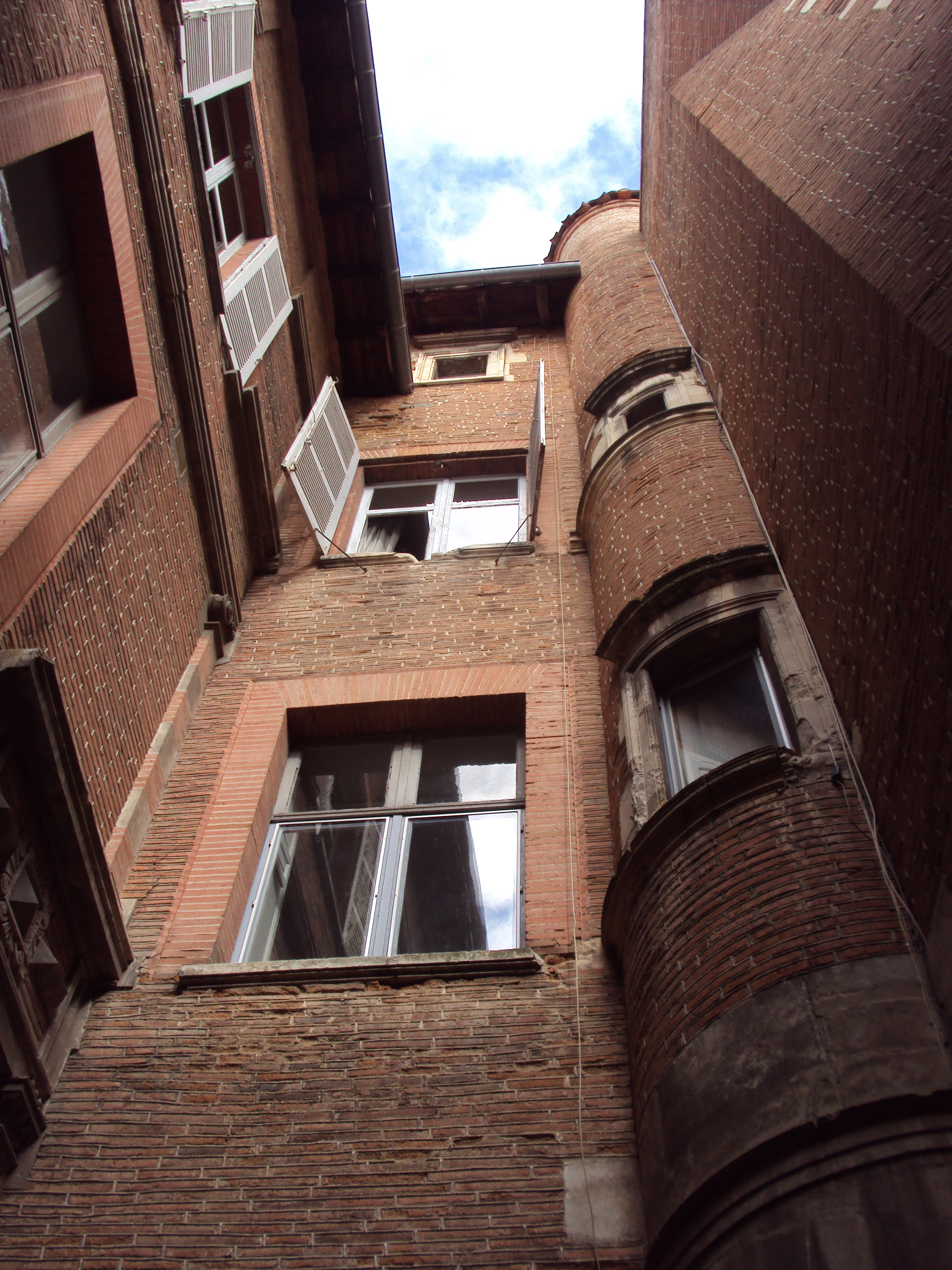

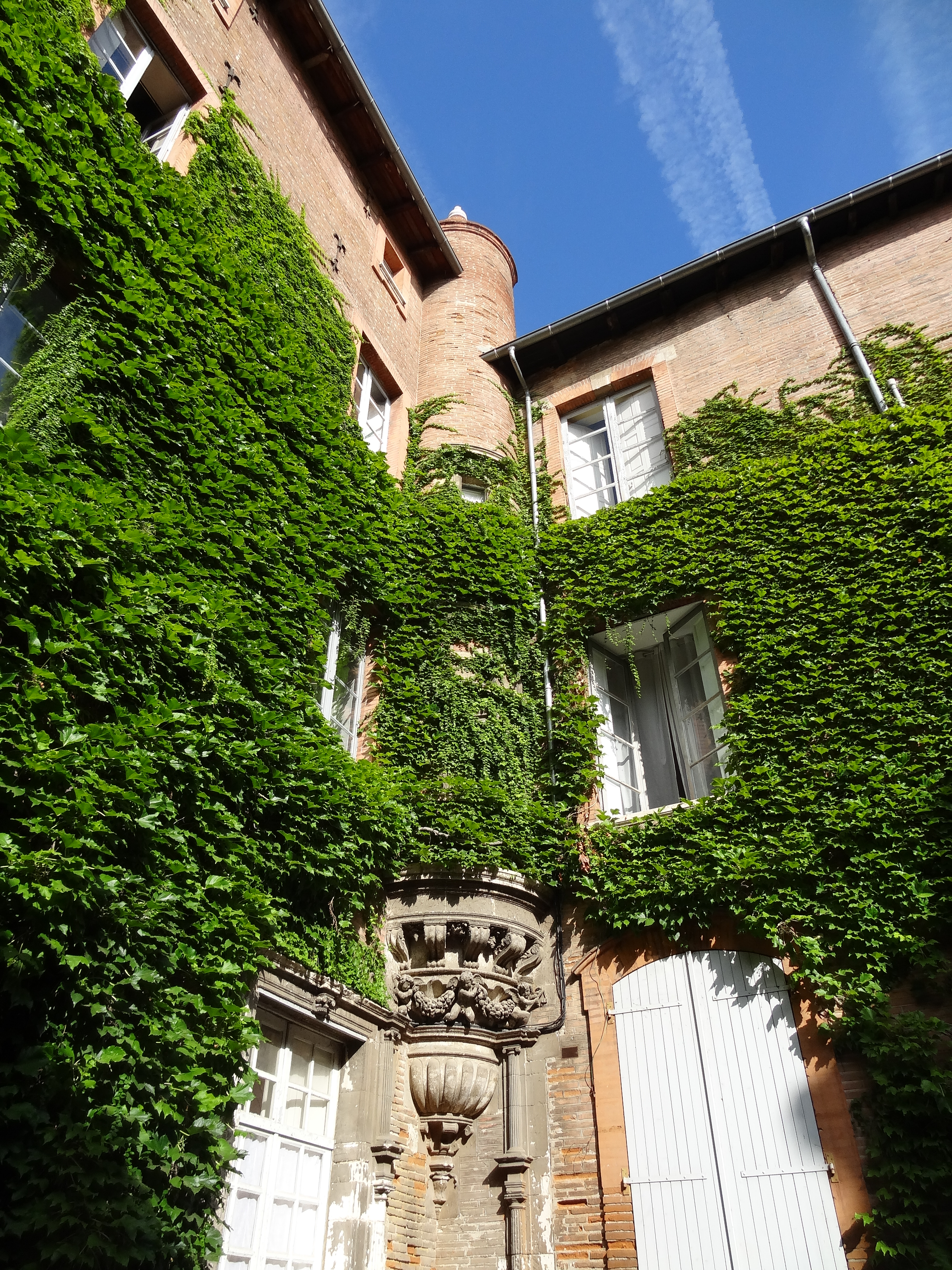

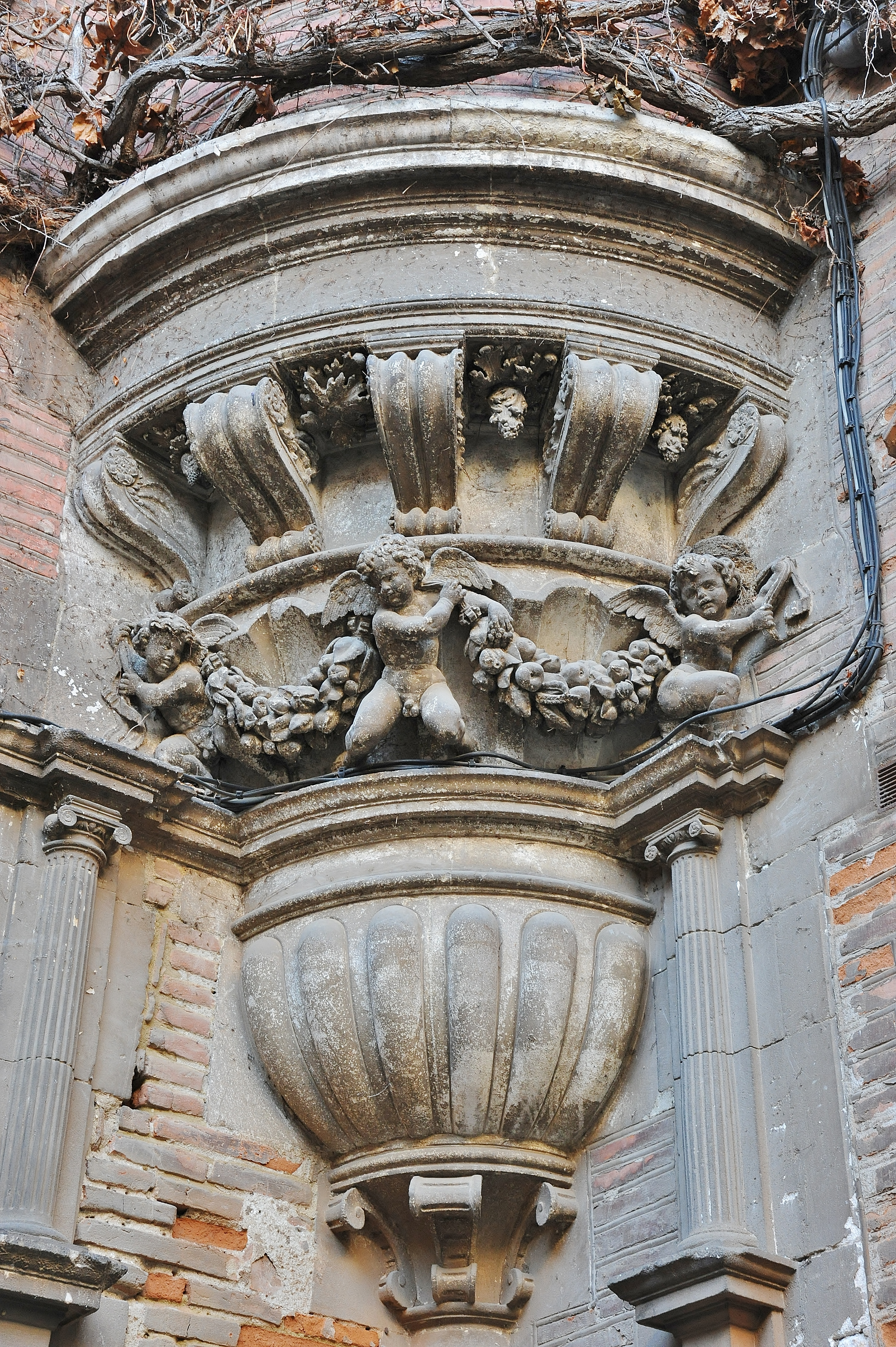

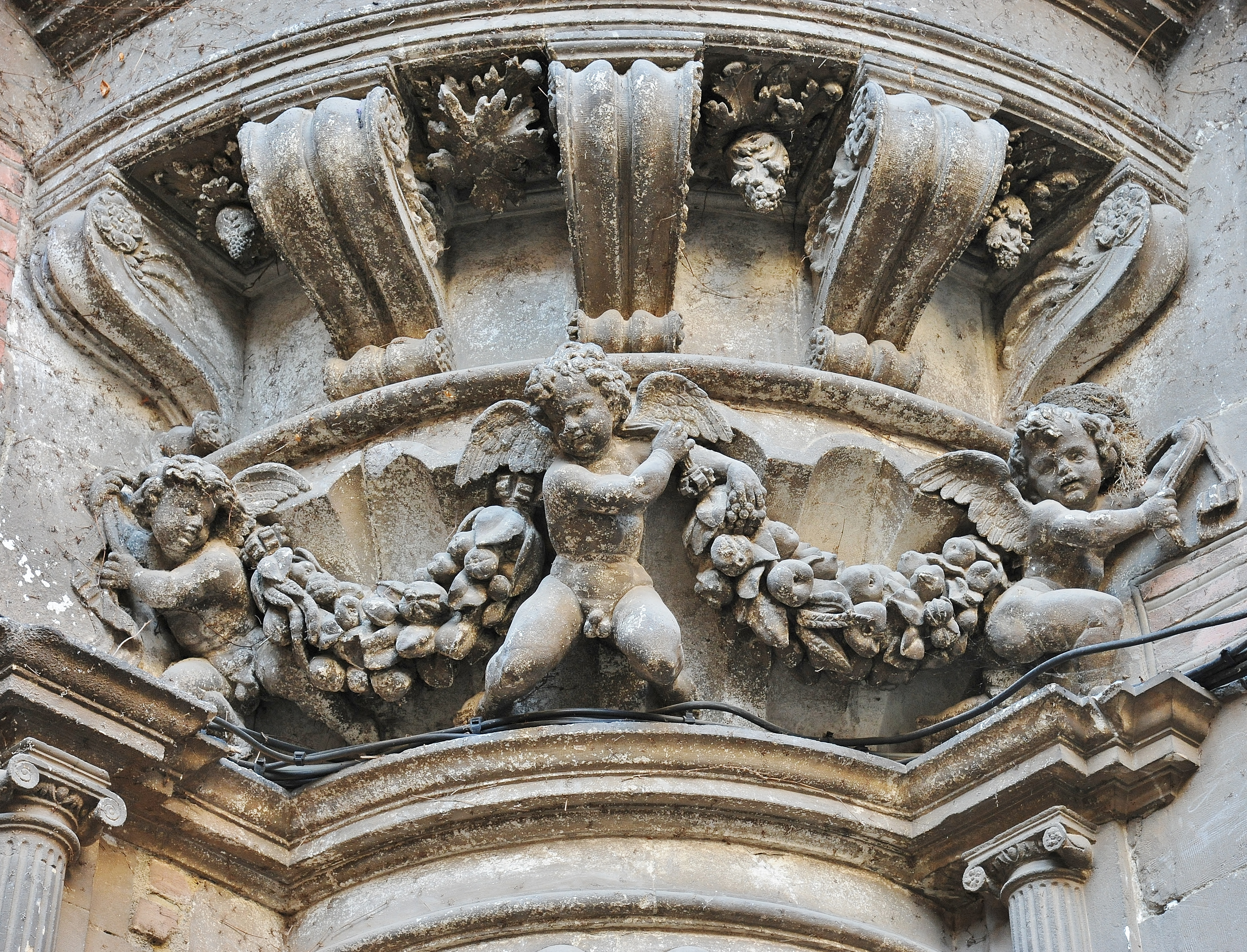

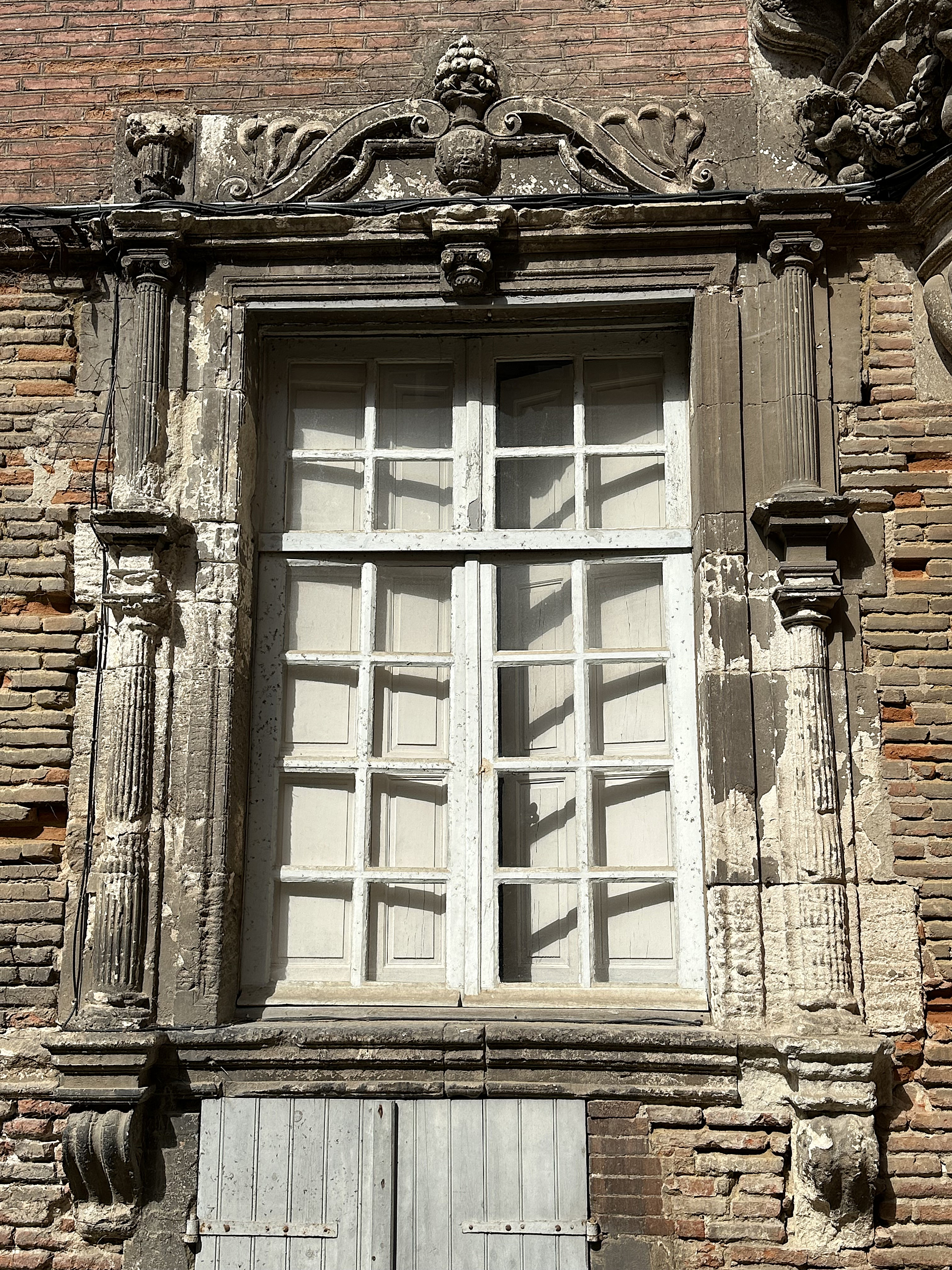

== See also ==
- Renaissance architecture of Toulouse

== Bibliography ==
- Guy Ahlsell de Toulza, Louis Peyrusse, Bruno Tollon, Hôtels et Demeures de Toulouse et du Midi Toulousain, Daniel Briand éditeur, Drémil Lafage, 1997
